= United States cities by crime rate (40,000–60,000) =

The following table is based on Federal Bureau of Investigation Uniform Crime Reports statistics.

The population numbers are based on U.S. Census estimates for the year end. The number of murders includes nonnegligent manslaughter. This list is based on the reporting agency. In most cases the city and the reporting agency are identical. However, in some cases the reporting agency has more than one city.

== Note about population ==
Data is voluntarily submitted by each jurisdiction and some jurisdictions do not appear in the table because they either did not submit data or it did not meet deadlines.

The FBI document on the UCR methodology has the following disclaimer on population estimates:

For population estimates, the FBI computed individual rates of growth from one year to the next for every city/town and county using the current decennial counts through the most recent population estimates available from the U.S. Census Bureau. Each agency’s rates of growth were averaged; that average was then applied and added to its most recent Census population estimate to derive the agency’s current year population estimate. Population totals for 2010 are from the U.S. Census Bureau’s decennial population counts.

== 2024 Calendar Year Ratios of Crime Per 100,000 Population ==
Rates are based on cases per 100,000 for all of calendar 2024.

State	City	Popul.	Yearly Crime Rates per 100,000 people										
State	City	Popul.	Total	Violent crime					Arson^{1}	Property crime			
State	City	Popul.	Total	Murder and Nonnegligent manslaughter	Rape	Robbery	Aggravated assault	Total	Arson^{1}	Burglary	Larceny theft	Motor vehicle theft	Total
Alabama	Decatur	58,514	3106.95	8.54	54.69	44.43	499.03	606.69	191.41	193.12	1833.75	281.98	2308.85
Alabama	Florence	43,076	2651.13	0.00	37.14	20.89	571.08	629.12	4.64	232.15	1620.39	164.82	2017.36
Arizona	Apache Junction	41,994	1947.90	2.38	42.86	9.53	371.48	426.25	9.53	166.69	1107.30	238.13	1512.12
Arizona	Bullhead City	43,923	2663.75	2.28	13.66	47.81	391.59	455.34	15.94	229.95	1696.15	266.38	2192.47
Arizona	Lake Havasu City	59,898	1752.98	0.00	48.42	13.36	293.83	355.60	3.34	233.73	1070.15	90.15	1394.04
Arizona	Oro Valley	48,680	1199.67	0.00	6.16	2.05	43.14	51.36	0.00	57.52	1049.71	41.08	1148.32
Arizona	Prescott	48,339	1456.38	2.07	22.76	18.62	291.69	335.13	4.14	223.42	846.11	47.58	1117.11
Arizona	Prescott Valley	51,116	1007.51	3.91	45.00	5.87	170.20	224.98	13.69	45.00	667.11	56.73	768.84
Arizona	Sierra Vista	44,119	1894.88	2.27	20.40	24.93	169.99	217.59	13.60	165.46	1418.89	79.33	1663.68
California	Aliso Viejo	49,674	1008.58	0.00	0.00	26.17	108.71	134.88	6.04	86.56	646.21	134.88	867.66
California	Arcadia	53,397	3063.84	0.00	20.60	101.13	108.62	230.35	13.11	623.63	1949.55	247.20	2820.38
California	Azusa	47,647	1771.36	8.40	23.09	88.15	151.11	270.74	16.79	186.79	973.83	323.21	1483.83
California	Brea	48,901	3081.74	2.04	12.27	92.02	104.29	210.63	6.13	269.93	2439.62	155.42	2864.97
California	Campbell	41,029	3538.96	0.00	46.31	170.61	272.98	489.90	99.93	482.59	2008.34	458.21	2949.13
California	Cathedral City	52,602	1532.26	0.00	30.42	55.13	197.71	283.26	28.52	184.40	680.58	355.50	1220.49
California	Ceres	48,107	2267.86	4.16	70.68	91.46	230.74	397.03	22.87	149.67	1353.23	345.06	1847.96
California	Cerritos	45,961	5683.08	2.18	19.58	187.12	141.42	350.30	0.00	974.74	3737.95	620.09	5332.78
California	Coachella	44,131	1849.04	11.33	24.93	47.59	215.27	299.11	9.06	176.75	951.71	412.41	1540.87
California	Colton	53,153	2507.85	5.64	22.58	105.36	259.63	393.20	9.41	301.02	1418.55	385.68	2105.24
California	Covina	47,940	1996.25	8.34	20.86	100.13	223.20	352.52	31.29	454.74	907.38	250.31	1612.43
California	Cupertino	56,375	1694.01	0.00	14.19	51.44	46.12	111.75	15.96	235.92	1264.75	65.63	1566.30
California	Cypress	48,367	1879.38	0.00	22.74	41.35	221.23	285.32	4.14	454.86	940.72	194.35	1589.93
California	Danville	42,814	670.34	0.00	16.35	14.01	32.70	63.06	23.36	63.06	476.48	44.38	583.92
California	Delano	52,061	1490.56	1.92	53.78	51.86	236.26	343.83	34.57	84.52	676.13	351.51	1112.16
California	Diamond Bar	51,126	1946.17	0.00	9.78	21.52	46.94	78.24	5.87	676.76	1040.57	144.74	1862.07
California	El Centro	43,550	1607.35	4.59	22.96	73.48	227.32	328.36	11.48	475.32	622.27	169.92	1267.51
California	Fountain Valley	54,975	1975.44	0.00	16.37	61.85	100.05	178.26	12.73	274.67	1336.97	172.81	1784.45
California	Gardena	57,584	3766.67	5.21	27.79	201.44	468.88	703.32	12.16	421.99	1727.91	901.29	3051.19
California	Gilroy	57,877	2672.91	0.00	55.29	114.03	292.00	461.32	48.38	255.71	1504.92	402.58	2163.21
California	Glendora	49,136	2183.73	0.00	14.25	40.70	113.97	168.92	16.28	360.22	1463.29	175.02	1998.53
California	Highland	55,936	1882.51	7.15	23.24	116.20	387.94	534.54	25.03	200.23	729.41	393.31	1322.94
California	Hollister	45,626	1174.77	2.19	41.64	37.26	252.05	333.14	10.96	54.79	618.07	157.80	830.67
California	Huntington Park	51,054	3841.03	5.88	58.76	395.66	231.13	691.42	29.38	446.59	1610.06	1063.58	3120.23
California	La Mirada	44,755	1972.96	2.23	4.47	73.73	91.61	172.05	6.70	286.00	1164.12	344.10	1794.21
California	Lathrop	44,277	1741.31	2.26	27.10	65.50	207.78	302.64	18.07	117.44	1124.74	178.42	1420.60
California	Lincoln	56,152	666.05	1.78	17.81	14.25	62.33	96.17	8.90	35.62	491.52	33.84	560.98
California	Lompoc	42,607	1971.51	0.00	58.68	82.15	359.10	499.92	14.08	159.60	950.55	347.36	1457.51
California	Los Banos	49,549	2062.60	2.02	40.36	40.36	131.18	213.93	16.15	201.82	1404.67	226.04	1832.53
California	Montebello	59,231	3126.74	3.38	23.64	133.38	334.28	494.67	18.57	312.34	1475.58	825.58	2613.50
California	Monterey Park	56,904	2397.02	1.76	19.33	112.47	140.59	274.15	12.30	414.73	1340.85	354.98	2110.57
California	Morgan Hill	44,083	1717.22	2.27	20.42	43.10	129.30	195.09	13.61	176.94	1102.47	229.11	1508.52
California	National City	54,915	2651.37	7.28	29.14	222.16	437.04	695.62	16.39	242.19	1039.79	657.38	1939.36
California	Newark	46,736	4373.50	2.14	14.98	128.38	235.36	380.86	29.96	457.89	2608.27	896.53	3962.68
California	Novato	51,258	1644.62	0.00	33.17	46.82	173.63	253.62	37.07	78.04	1113.97	161.93	1353.93
California	Oakley	46,548	1121.42	0.00	27.93	25.78	92.38	146.09	8.59	96.67	607.97	262.10	966.74
California	Palm Desert	52,205	3158.70	0.00	21.07	78.54	224.12	323.72	7.66	446.32	2162.63	218.37	2827.32
California	Palm Springs	45,406	3836.50	11.01	68.27	147.56	376.60	603.44	19.82	385.41	2354.31	473.51	3213.23
California	Paramount	50,265	3396.00	1.99	19.89	198.95	326.27	547.10	33.82	441.66	1338.90	1034.52	2815.08
California	Petaluma	58,493	1468.55	0.00	44.45	44.45	182.93	271.83	23.93	95.74	976.19	100.87	1172.79
California	Pico Rivera	58,318	2500.09	5.14	27.44	188.62	246.92	468.12	15.43	264.07	1150.59	601.87	2016.53
California	Placentia	52,034	1839.18	1.92	17.30	59.58	278.66	357.46	15.37	245.99	985.89	234.46	1466.35
California	Poway	47,808	717.45	0.00	4.18	29.28	100.40	133.87	0.00	110.86	412.06	60.66	583.58
California	Rancho Santa Margarita	45,633	607.02	0.00	0.00	17.53	63.55	81.08	2.19	72.32	350.62	100.80	523.74
California	Rohnert Park	44,573	1532.32	2.24	74.04	38.14	143.58	258.00	11.22	235.57	850.29	177.24	1263.10
California	Rosemead	48,740	2868.28	8.21	16.41	143.62	184.65	352.89	12.31	471.89	1612.64	418.55	2503.08
California	San Bruno	40,553	2234.11	0.00	14.80	56.72	184.94	256.45	12.33	56.72	1634.90	273.72	1965.33
California	San Jacinto	55,863	1997.74	3.58	12.53	116.36	121.73	254.19	16.11	366.97	1099.12	261.35	1727.44
California	San Luis Obispo	49,948	3097.22	0.00	60.06	82.09	282.29	424.44	4.00	322.34	2196.28	150.16	2668.78
California	San Rafael	59,037	3042.16	1.69	50.82	149.06	357.40	558.97	27.10	264.24	1770.08	421.77	2456.09
California	Santee	59,351	837.39	3.37	8.42	42.12	200.50	254.42	11.79	75.82	374.05	121.31	571.18
California	Watsonville	50,340	1589.19	0.00	55.62	53.64	290.03	399.28	7.95	139.05	744.93	297.97	1181.96
California	West Sacramento	56,536	1675.04	3.54	22.99	79.60	187.49	293.62	12.38	224.64	866.70	277.70	1369.04
California	Yucaipa	53,735	1183.59	0.00	14.89	48.39	286.59	349.87	9.30	160.04	511.77	152.60	824.42
Colorado	Brighton	43,231	3004.79	2.31	80.96	37.01	351.60	471.88	13.88	249.82	1903.73	365.48	2519.03
Colorado	Littleton	44,076	2738.45	2.27	77.14	34.03	99.83	213.27	6.81	349.40	1653.96	515.02	2518.38
Colorado	Windsor	43,050	566.78	0.00	0.00	2.32	44.13	46.46	0.00	60.39	394.89	65.04	520.33
Connecticut	East Hartford	50,584	1761.43	5.93	11.86	29.65	41.52	88.96	1.98	126.52	1194.05	349.91	1670.49
Connecticut	Enfield	40,659	2036.45	0.00	29.51	19.68	113.14	162.33	2.46	233.65	1483.07	154.95	1871.66
Connecticut	Hamden	59,908	3553.78	1.67	8.35	55.08	365.56	430.66	5.01	211.99	2176.67	729.45	3118.11
Connecticut	Manchester	59,378	2253.36	0.00	42.10	32.00	58.94	133.05	5.05	229.04	1675.70	210.52	2115.26
Connecticut	Meriden	59,943	1823.40	1.67	20.02	51.72	55.05	128.46	6.67	305.29	1214.49	168.49	1688.27
Connecticut	Middletown	48,331	1216.61	2.07	4.14	18.62	37.24	62.07	4.14	115.87	864.87	169.66	1150.40
Connecticut	Milford	53,065	2219.92	1.88	24.50	69.73	20.73	116.84	7.54	86.69	1816.64	192.22	2095.54
Connecticut	Shelton	42,616	750.89	0.00	4.69	16.43	21.12	42.24	0.00	58.66	539.70	110.29	708.65
Connecticut	Southington	43,849	1582.70	0.00	9.12	41.05	15.96	66.14	2.28	177.88	1233.78	102.62	1514.29
Connecticut	Stratford	52,531	2059.74	0.00	13.33	28.55	24.75	66.63	7.61	127.54	1562.89	295.06	1985.49
Connecticut	Wallingford	43,561	470.60	4.59	0.00	2.30	11.48	18.37	2.30	25.25	394.85	29.84	449.94
Connecticut	West Haven	54,598	1342.54	3.66	14.65	40.29	45.79	104.40	0.00	122.72	838.86	276.57	1238.14
Delaware	Dover	40,087	7102.05	17.46	39.91	114.75	840.67	1012.80	19.96	139.70	5572.88	356.72	6069.30
Florida^{3}	Altamonte Springs	44,956	2651.48	0.00	26.69	51.16	262.48	340.33	0.00	166.83	2026.43	117.89	2311.15
Florida^{3}	Bradenton	57,503	2318.14	6.96	40.00	52.17	349.55	448.67	3.48	198.25	1599.92	67.82	1865.99
Florida^{3}	Cutler Bay	43,290	1517.67	2.31	13.86	48.51	83.16	147.84	6.93	53.13	1166.55	143.22	1362.90
Florida^{3}	Greenacres City	44,143	1601.61	4.53	31.72	56.63	151.78	244.66	11.33	99.68	1134.95	111.00	1345.63
Florida^{3}	Haines City	41,035	926.04	4.87	9.75	12.18	104.79	131.59	0.00	138.91	599.49	56.05	794.44
Florida^{3}	Lake Worth	41,324	3399.96	9.68	60.50	210.53	450.10	730.81	12.10	297.65	2076.28	283.13	2657.05
Florida^{3}	North Miami Beach	42,574	3502.14	9.40	39.93	194.95	338.23	582.52	7.05	364.07	2372.34	176.16	2912.58
Florida^{3}	Oviedo	41,656	688.98	0.00	16.80	9.60	79.22	105.63	0.00	98.43	470.52	14.40	583.35
Florida^{3}	Pinellas Park	53,481	2443.86	5.61	26.18	41.14	160.80	233.73	3.74	192.59	1843.65	170.15	2206.39
Florida^{3}	Sarasota	58,432	2164.91	11.98	39.36	85.57	412.45	549.36	0.00	246.44	1358.84	10.27	1615.55
Florida^{3}	Titusville	49,970	1803.08	0.00	40.02	42.03	436.26	518.31	4.00	252.15	1022.61	6.00	1280.77
Florida^{3}	Winter Haven	59,450	1786.38	6.73	5.05	23.55	200.17	235.49	1.68	161.48	1278.39	109.34	1549.20
Georgia	Brookhaven	58,329	2556.19	8.57	29.15	109.72	156.01	303.45	12.00	286.31	1740.13	214.30	2240.74
Georgia	Douglasville	40,595	5170.59	7.39	73.90	66.51	384.28	532.09	2.46	438.48	4049.76	147.80	4636.04
Georgia	Dunwoody	51,752	3499.38	1.93	15.46	50.24	156.52	224.15	1.93	208.69	2871.39	193.23	3273.30
Georgia	Gainesville	48,944	2803.20	12.26	77.64	81.73	316.69	488.31	14.30	147.11	1994.12	159.37	2300.59
Georgia	Milton	41,603	548.04	0.00	12.02	12.02	69.71	93.74	4.81	38.46	394.20	16.83	449.49
Georgia	Newnan	45,655	2295.48	6.57	61.33	37.24	446.83	551.97	0.00	140.18	1522.29	81.04	1743.51
Georgia	Peachtree City	40,820	840.27	0.00	2.45	4.90	14.70	22.05	2.45	56.34	734.93	24.50	815.78
Georgia	Smyrna	56,700	1541.45	3.53	24.69	26.46	172.84	227.51	1.76	252.20	883.60	176.37	1312.17
Georgia	Valdosta	54,896	4639.68	7.29	49.18	114.76	384.36	555.60	5.46	455.41	3379.12	244.10	4078.62
Idaho	Coeur d'Alene	57,561	1205.68	0.00	92.08	12.16	137.25	241.48	8.69	99.03	807.84	48.64	955.51
Idaho	Pocatello	58,618	1936.27	0.00	39.24	15.35	286.60	341.19	8.53	254.19	1189.05	143.30	1586.54
Idaho	Post Falls	46,835	796.41	2.14	8.54	10.68	130.24	151.60	2.14	87.54	508.17	46.97	642.68
Idaho	Rexburg	40,164	602.53	2.49	22.41	0.00	44.82	69.71	9.96	39.84	463.10	19.92	522.86
Idaho	Twin Falls	55,932	1548.31	5.36	91.18	8.94	311.09	416.58	5.36	96.55	947.58	82.24	1126.37
Illinois	Belleville	40,225	2366.69	14.92	77.07	37.29	402.73	532.01	22.37	581.73	902.42	328.15	1812.31
Illinois	Berwyn	53,581	1259.77	0.00	14.93	57.86	46.66	119.45	7.47	130.64	802.52	199.70	1132.86
Illinois	Buffalo Grove	42,283	752.08	0.00	4.73	4.73	11.83	21.29	14.19	115.89	548.68	52.03	716.60
Illinois	Crystal Lake	41,074	1214.88	0.00	48.69	4.87	51.13	104.69	7.30	102.25	927.59	73.04	1102.89
Illinois	DeKalb	40,208	2909.87	0.00	151.71	34.82	206.43	392.96	2.49	338.24	2123.96	52.23	2514.42
Illinois	Des Plaines	57,218	1263.59	0.00	19.22	24.47	76.90	120.59	3.50	417.70	601.21	120.59	1139.50
Illinois	Downers Grove	49,567	1000.67	2.02	36.31	8.07	66.58	112.98	16.14	135.17	647.61	88.77	871.55
Illinois	Elmhurst	45,206	882.63	0.00	13.27	17.70	28.76	59.73	0.00	148.21	639.30	35.39	822.90
Illinois	Glenview	46,371	1373.70	0.00	43.13	10.78	97.04	150.96	12.94	321.32	813.01	75.48	1209.81
Illinois	Hoffman Estates	49,467	1146.22	0.00	36.39	14.15	99.06	149.59	4.04	248.65	624.66	119.27	992.58
Illinois	Lombard	43,576	1728.02	0.00	39.01	25.24	52.78	117.04	11.47	181.29	1356.25	61.96	1599.50
Illinois	Moline	41,659	3727.89	12.00	55.21	26.40	290.45	384.07	9.60	1116.21	1742.72	475.29	3334.21
Illinois	Mount Prospect	53,523	979.02	1.87	24.29	13.08	50.45	89.68	1.87	203.65	596.01	87.81	887.47
Illinois	Normal	52,573	1885.00	3.80	95.11	15.22	214.94	329.07	5.71	232.06	1232.57	85.60	1550.23
Illinois	Oak Lawn	54,953	1912.54	3.64	36.39	43.67	96.45	180.15	5.46	343.93	1155.53	227.47	1726.93
Illinois	Oak Park	51,306	3941.06	5.85	52.63	124.74	140.33	323.55	9.75	1062.25	2159.59	385.92	3607.77
Illinois	Orland Park	56,593	1132.65	1.77	1.77	12.37	12.37	28.27	7.07	227.94	782.78	86.58	1097.31
Illinois	Plainfield	48,311	741.03	0.00	14.49	6.21	37.26	57.96	0.00	124.20	521.62	37.26	683.07
Illinois	Romeoville	41,007	1168.09	0.00	24.39	19.51	107.30	151.19	4.88	180.46	709.63	121.93	1012.02
Illinois	Tinley Park	53,256	1355.72	7.51	24.41	18.78	58.21	108.91	1.88	199.04	893.80	152.10	1244.93
Illinois	Wheaton	52,649	594.50	0.00	26.59	5.70	17.09	49.38	3.80	93.07	425.46	22.79	541.32
Indiana	Anderson	55,355	2679.07	5.42	68.65	54.20	290.85	419.11	3.61	270.98	1658.39	326.98	2256.35
Indiana	Columbus	51,867	98.33	0.00	0.00	13.50	0.00	13.50	1.93	82.90	0.00	0.00	82.90
Indiana	Elkhart	53,357	3615.27	1.87	84.34	73.09	835.88	995.18	20.62	592.24	1720.49	286.75	2599.47
Indiana	Jeffersonville	51,804	1990.19	3.86	27.02	34.75	256.74	322.37	1.93	194.97	1125.40	345.53	1665.89
Indiana	Kokomo	59,995	1905.16	3.33	58.34	38.34	385.03	485.04	3.33	230.02	1026.75	160.01	1416.78
Indiana	Lawrence	49,200	2024.39	12.20	46.75	75.20	158.54	292.68	4.07	142.28	1150.41	434.96	1727.64
Indiana	Mishawaka	50,776	2808.41	0.00	45.30	33.48	157.55	236.33	1.97	346.62	1998.98	224.52	2570.11
Indiana	Terre Haute	58,536	4033.42	3.42	54.67	90.54	401.46	550.09	56.38	676.51	2345.57	404.88	3426.95
Indiana	West Lafayette	44,906	1298.27	0.00	6.68	4.45	82.39	93.53	0.00	62.35	1086.71	55.67	1204.74
Iowa	Bettendorf	40,105	974.94	0.00	42.39	4.99	57.35	104.73	2.49	164.57	633.34	69.82	867.72
Iowa	Dubuque	58,620	1845.79	1.71	80.18	23.88	295.12	400.89	10.24	228.59	1112.25	93.82	1434.66
Iowa	Marion	42,420	622.35	4.71	21.22	14.14	82.51	122.58	2.36	66.01	407.83	23.57	497.41
Iowa	Urbandale	47,119	725.82	0.00	10.61	2.12	76.40	89.14	2.12	82.77	411.72	140.07	634.56
Kansas	Lenexa	58,871	1533.86	6.79	23.78	15.29	137.59	183.45	3.40	108.71	1015.78	222.52	1347.01
Kansas	Salina	45,447	2999.10	0.00	88.01	81.41	323.45	492.88	30.81	323.45	1993.53	158.43	2475.41
Kentucky	Covington	40,984	1930.02	4.88	65.88	75.64	141.52	287.92	7.32	207.40	1085.79	341.60	1634.78
Kentucky	Georgetown	40,037	1296.30	7.49	27.47	17.48	69.94	122.39	5.00	167.35	909.16	92.41	1168.92
Louisiana	Alexandria	42,933	9326.16	37.27	123.45	163.04	2389.77	2713.53	16.30	868.80	5208.11	519.41	6596.32
Louisiana	Monroe	46,290	7628.00	15.12	30.24	164.18	1682.87	1892.42	2.16	1402.03	3977.10	354.29	5733.42
Maryland	Annapolis	40,446	2915.00	7.42	89.01	170.60	541.46	808.49	12.36	170.60	1654.06	269.50	2094.15
Maryland	Bowie	56,929	2473.26	0.00	35.13	57.97	100.12	193.22	0.00	138.77	1761.84	379.42	2280.03
Maryland	Hagerstown	43,563	3177.01	9.18	73.46	222.67	408.60	713.91	0.00	500.42	1501.27	461.40	2463.10
Massachusetts	Amherst	46,304	479.44	0.00	71.27	6.48	82.07	159.81	12.96	34.55	263.48	8.64	306.67
Massachusetts	Arlington	46,956	489.82	0.00	10.65	0.00	44.72	55.37	0.00	59.63	338.61	36.20	434.45
Massachusetts	Attleboro	47,594	1355.21	2.10	16.81	44.12	157.58	220.62	8.40	92.45	941.30	92.45	1126.19
Massachusetts	Barnstable	50,928	1207.59	1.96	64.80	17.67	325.95	410.38	11.78	131.56	581.21	72.65	785.42
Massachusetts	Beverly	43,024	578.75	0.00	18.59	4.65	144.11	167.35	0.00	44.16	320.75	46.49	411.40
Massachusetts	Billerica	42,332	514.98	0.00	21.26	7.09	73.23	101.58	2.36	37.80	318.91	54.33	411.04
Massachusetts	Chicopee	55,770	2331.00	7.17	86.07	41.24	432.13	566.61	3.59	202.62	1344.81	213.38	1760.80
Massachusetts	Everett	51,744	1667.83	0.00	46.38	21.26	280.23	347.87	5.80	112.09	1053.26	148.81	1314.16
Massachusetts	Fitchburg	42,332	1847.30	2.36	40.16	35.43	408.67	486.63	16.54	271.66	952.00	120.48	1344.14
Massachusetts	Leominster	44,407	1810.53	4.50	40.53	33.78	405.34	484.16	11.26	114.85	1080.91	119.35	1315.11
Massachusetts	Marlborough	41,785	1462.25	0.00	45.47	14.36	361.37	421.20	4.79	119.66	808.90	107.69	1036.26
Massachusetts	Medford	59,601	1385.88	0.00	21.81	23.49	134.23	179.53	6.71	77.18	1006.69	115.77	1199.64
Massachusetts	Methuen	54,623	972.12	0.00	9.15	0.00	166.60	175.75	0.00	47.60	682.86	65.91	796.37
Massachusetts	Peabody	54,964	1095.26	0.00	25.47	9.10	220.14	254.71	3.64	85.51	693.18	58.22	836.91
Massachusetts	Pittsfield	42,835	1753.24	4.67	98.05	28.01	380.53	511.26	2.33	385.20	756.39	98.05	1239.64
Massachusetts	Revere	57,779	1985.15	0.00	24.23	27.69	392.88	444.80	5.19	147.11	1227.09	160.96	1535.16
Massachusetts	Salem	45,955	1706.02	0.00	13.06	34.82	104.45	152.32	0.00	106.63	1346.97	100.10	1553.69
Massachusetts	Westfield	41,270	1008.00	0.00	21.81	9.69	159.92	191.42	9.69	75.12	646.96	84.81	806.88
Massachusetts	Woburn	42,716	1142.43	0.00	14.05	2.34	198.99	215.38	0.00	142.80	671.88	112.37	927.05
Michigan	Bloomfield Township	43,611	577.84	0.00	6.88	2.29	27.52	36.69	0.00	55.03	433.38	52.74	541.15
Michigan	Chesterfield Township	45,674	1162.59	0.00	28.46	2.19	83.20	113.85	2.19	48.17	928.32	70.06	1046.55
Michigan	East Lansing	50,472	1452.29	3.96	37.64	13.87	164.45	219.92	11.89	63.40	984.70	172.37	1220.48
Michigan	Kentwood	53,891	2582.99	1.86	59.38	37.11	289.47	387.82	12.99	215.25	1616.23	350.71	2182.18
Michigan	Meridian Township	43,912	1885.59	0.00	40.99	20.50	120.70	182.18	2.28	134.36	1377.76	189.01	1701.13
Michigan	Midland	42,712	777.30	2.34	39.80	2.34	77.26	121.75	0.00	51.51	580.63	23.41	655.55
Michigan	Portage	49,416	3264.12	0.00	48.57	20.24	208.43	277.24	12.14	269.14	2545.73	159.87	2974.75
Michigan	Redford Township	47,067	2462.45	4.25	50.99	44.62	444.05	543.91	17.00	278.33	998.58	624.64	1901.54
Michigan	Roseville	46,358	3852.63	2.16	71.19	38.83	409.85	522.02	19.41	291.21	2584.24	435.74	3311.19
Michigan	Royal Oak	57,257	927.40	0.00	6.99	12.23	104.79	124.00	1.75	64.62	616.52	120.51	801.65
Michigan	Saginaw	42,880	4223.41	44.31	132.93	135.26	1888.99	2201.49	62.97	536.38	1128.73	293.84	1958.96
Michigan	Saginaw Township	40,864	1605.32	4.89	31.81	19.58	117.46	173.75	4.89	173.75	1142.82	110.12	1426.68
Michigan	St. Clair Shores	57,157	1250.94	0.00	19.25	20.99	145.21	185.45	0.00	349.91	559.86	155.71	1065.49
Minnesota	Apple Valley	55,028	1882.68	0.00	19.99	16.36	178.09	214.44	0.00	103.58	1481.06	83.59	1668.24
Minnesota	Cottage Grove	43,131	721.06	0.00	16.23	9.27	13.91	39.41	0.00	60.28	581.95	39.41	681.64
Minnesota	Edina	53,347	1567.10	0.00	7.50	9.37	56.24	73.11	3.75	236.19	1087.22	166.83	1490.24
Minnesota	Mankato	46,137	2874.05	4.33	65.02	13.00	173.40	255.76	8.67	275.27	2197.80	136.55	2609.62
Minnesota	Minnetonka	51,935	1759.89	0.00	17.33	13.48	84.72	115.53	5.78	188.70	1372.87	77.02	1638.59
Minnesota	Moorhead	45,424	2056.18	8.81	59.44	26.42	270.78	365.45	15.41	288.39	1166.78	220.15	1675.33
Minnesota	Shakopee	48,239	1274.90	0.00	47.68	8.29	60.12	116.09	0.00	82.92	1013.70	62.19	1158.81
Minnesota	St. Louis Park	49,592	3508.63	0.00	28.23	16.13	135.10	179.46	2.02	320.62	2764.56	241.97	3327.15
Mississippi	Hattiesburg	48,307	3697.19	12.42	39.33	33.12	136.63	221.50	10.35	370.55	2873.29	221.50	3465.34
Mississippi	Olive Branch	47,178	1557.93	0.00	14.84	33.91	150.49	199.25	0.00	76.31	1015.30	267.07	1358.68
Mississippi	Southaven	57,537	2332.41	1.74	20.86	31.28	250.27	304.15	3.48	170.33	1612.88	241.58	2024.78
Missouri	Cape Girardeau	40,753	3094.25	7.36	51.53	31.90	532.48	623.27	14.72	296.91	1931.15	228.20	2456.26
Missouri	Chesterfield	48,907	1382.22	2.04	10.22	10.22	73.61	96.10	0.00	108.37	1089.82	87.92	1286.11
Missouri	Florissant	50,695	2181.67	3.95	57.20	47.34	232.76	341.26	7.89	147.94	1080.97	603.61	1832.53
Missouri	Jefferson City	42,561	2394.21	0.00	93.98	30.54	209.11	333.64	21.15	140.97	1788.02	110.43	2039.43
Missouri	Joplin	53,533	4731.66	0.00	89.66	52.30	418.43	560.40	50.44	416.57	3298.90	405.36	4120.82
Missouri	St. Peters	59,993	1266.81	1.67	26.67	13.33	165.02	206.69	1.67	61.67	901.77	95.01	1058.46
Missouri	Wentzville	48,377	855.78	2.07	6.20	2.07	99.22	109.56	2.07	43.41	642.87	57.88	744.16
Montana	Bozeman	58,509	2211.63	0.00	85.46	11.96	336.70	434.12	22.22	143.57	1514.30	97.42	1755.29
Nebraska	Grand Island	52,488	2139.54	0.00	72.40	32.39	262.92	367.70	11.43	241.96	1419.37	99.07	1760.40
New Hampshire	Concord	44,827	1425.48	6.69	40.15	35.69	98.16	180.69	15.62	49.08	1064.09	116.00	1229.17
New Jersey	Berkeley Township	46,319	725.40	0.00	17.27	4.32	110.11	131.70	2.16	71.25	492.24	28.07	591.55
New Jersey	Bloomfield	55,161	1584.45	0.00	0.00	39.88	83.39	123.28	0.00	88.83	1147.55	224.80	1461.18
New Jersey	Bridgewater Township	46,946	1020.32	0.00	10.65	6.39	6.39	23.43	0.00	85.20	877.60	34.08	996.89
New Jersey	East Brunswick Township	50,487	1305.29	0.00	1.98	23.77	101.02	126.77	7.92	104.98	1012.14	53.48	1170.60
New Jersey	Egg Harbor Township	47,892	1829.12	0.00	16.70	20.88	108.58	146.16	8.35	265.18	1342.60	66.82	1674.60
New Jersey	Evesham Township	49,011	1446.61	0.00	14.28	24.48	42.85	81.61	14.28	77.53	1228.30	44.89	1350.72
New Jersey	Fort Lee	40,445	1233.77	0.00	14.83	34.61	81.59	131.04	2.47	153.29	798.62	148.35	1100.26
New Jersey	Hackensack	46,667	2275.70	0.00	19.29	40.71	186.43	246.43	4.29	259.28	1583.56	182.14	2024.99
New Jersey	Hillsborough Township	45,555	452.20	0.00	2.20	0.00	59.27	61.46	0.00	76.83	296.35	17.56	390.74
New Jersey	Hoboken	57,293	1972.32	1.75	1.75	62.83	122.18	188.50	0.00	118.69	1560.40	104.72	1783.81
New Jersey	Howell Township	53,988	883.53	1.85	12.97	7.41	61.12	83.35	3.70	92.61	672.37	31.49	796.47
New Jersey	Manalapan Township	40,430	682.66	0.00	0.00	0.00	34.63	34.63	0.00	165.72	447.69	34.63	648.03
New Jersey	Manchester Township	47,488	513.81	4.21	18.95	2.11	35.80	61.07	2.11	42.12	391.68	16.85	450.64
New Jersey	Marlboro Township	41,344	945.72	2.42	2.42	4.84	60.47	70.14	0.00	123.36	703.85	48.37	875.58
New Jersey	Monroe Township	49,652	273.91	0.00	0.00	0.00	12.08	12.08	0.00	60.42	179.25	22.15	261.82
New Jersey	Montclair	40,656	954.35	0.00	12.30	22.14	83.63	118.06	0.00	223.83	536.21	76.25	836.28
New Jersey	Mount Laurel Township	46,978	2243.60	0.00	29.80	34.06	131.98	195.84	2.13	138.36	1739.11	168.16	2045.64
New Jersey	New Brunswick	57,259	3335.72	15.72	45.41	277.69	359.77	698.58	10.48	293.40	2160.36	172.90	2626.66
New Jersey	North Bergen Township	59,532	992.74	3.36	25.20	48.71	139.42	216.69	0.00	41.99	624.87	109.18	776.05
New Jersey	North Brunswick Township	45,184	1540.37	0.00	2.21	42.05	92.95	137.22	0.00	84.10	1199.54	119.51	1403.15
New Jersey	Parsippany-Troy Hills Township	57,606	913.10	0.00	13.89	3.47	34.72	52.08	3.47	147.55	666.60	43.40	857.55
New Jersey	Perth Amboy	56,409	1765.68	5.32	21.27	39.00	326.19	391.78	5.32	166.64	1037.07	164.87	1368.58
New Jersey	Plainfield	55,975	2022.33	0.00	14.29	103.62	292.99	410.90	1.79	135.77	1345.24	128.63	1609.65
New Jersey	South Brunswick Township	47,468	897.45	0.00	8.43	4.21	88.48	101.12	6.32	92.69	621.47	75.84	790.01
New Jersey	Teaneck Township	42,771	902.48	4.68	16.37	18.70	56.11	95.86	9.35	114.56	640.62	42.08	797.27
New Jersey	Wayne Township	53,295	1960.78	0.00	0.00	13.13	80.68	93.82	5.63	95.69	1707.48	58.17	1861.34
New Jersey	West New York	51,260	1759.66	0.00	46.82	60.48	189.23	296.53	0.00	124.85	1219.27	119.00	1463.13
New Jersey	West Orange	48,638	1558.45	2.06	4.11	34.95	98.69	139.81	2.06	213.82	1077.35	125.42	1416.59
New Jersey	Winslow Township	40,970	1103.25	0.00	0.00	36.61	80.55	117.16	2.44	100.07	781.06	102.51	983.65
New Mexico	Farmington	46,150	3443.12	4.33	121.34	71.51	754.06	951.25	32.50	364.03	1837.49	257.85	2459.37
New Mexico	Roswell	46,677	3408.53	12.85	81.41	42.85	711.27	848.38	51.42	428.48	1883.15	197.10	2508.73
New York	Binghamton	46,378	3986.80	6.47	58.22	73.31	394.58	532.58	40.97	422.61	2787.96	202.68	3413.26
New York	Freeport Village	43,583	1080.70	2.29	2.29	45.89	112.43	162.91	2.29	25.24	775.53	114.72	915.49
New York	Hamburg Town	47,687	1547.59	2.10	4.19	14.68	31.46	52.43	4.19	134.21	1243.53	113.24	1490.97
New York	Hempstead Village	58,013	1563.44	5.17	5.17	137.90	310.28	458.52	6.90	163.76	717.08	217.19	1098.03
New York	Irondequoit Town	49,336	1868.82	10.13	12.16	26.35	83.10	131.75	0.00	202.69	1058.05	476.33	1737.07
New York	Niagara Falls	47,296	3325.86	6.34	8.46	93.03	393.27	501.10	16.91	327.72	2188.35	291.78	2807.85
New York	Orangetown Town	41,682	616.57	0.00	0.00	7.20	50.38	57.58	0.00	23.99	527.81	7.20	558.99
New York	Poughkeepsie Town	40,746	2785.55	0.00	27.00	49.08	100.62	176.70	19.63	127.62	2407.60	53.99	2589.21
New York	Southampton Town	59,965	817.14	0.00	3.34	6.67	48.36	58.37	0.00	66.71	665.39	26.68	758.78
New York	Tonawanda Town	56,110	1698.45	0.00	1.78	23.17	57.03	81.98	3.56	185.35	1121.01	306.54	1612.90
New York	Troy	50,372	3271.66	1.99	43.68	107.20	317.64	470.50	27.79	391.09	2098.39	283.89	2773.37
New York	Webster Town and Village	45,084	969.30	0.00	4.44	8.87	44.36	57.67	2.22	51.02	738.62	119.78	909.41
New York	West Seneca Town	44,982	1840.74	2.22	6.67	22.23	93.37	124.49	6.67	162.29	1318.31	228.98	1709.57
North Carolina	Fuquay-Varina	47,436	651.40	0.00	12.65	10.54	46.38	69.57	2.11	63.24	484.86	31.62	579.73
North Carolina	Hickory	44,682	3247.39	2.24	24.62	55.95	324.52	407.32	15.67	409.56	2150.75	264.09	2824.40
North Carolina	Mooresville	54,823	2373.09	3.65	56.55	21.89	134.98	217.06	3.65	138.63	1893.37	120.39	2152.38
North Carolina	Rocky Mount	54,223	4793.17	12.91	38.73	156.76	556.96	765.36	47.95	739.54	2849.34	390.98	3979.86
North Carolina	Wake Forest	55,872	1455.11	3.58	5.37	8.95	128.87	146.76	3.58	103.81	1116.84	84.12	1304.77
North Carolina	Wilson	47,825	3010.98	25.09	27.18	62.73	464.19	579.19	29.27	286.46	1881.86	234.19	2402.51
North Dakota	Grand Forks	58,848	2642.40	5.10	73.07	27.19	253.19	358.55	1.70	256.59	1874.32	151.24	2282.15
North Dakota	Minot	47,041	1755.92	2.13	53.15	44.64	218.96	318.87	34.01	240.22	939.61	223.21	1403.03
North Dakota	West Fargo	40,915	1182.94	2.44	53.77	12.22	95.32	163.75	4.89	232.19	689.23	92.88	1014.30
Ohio	Beavercreek	47,389	2070.10	2.11	18.99	16.88	35.87	73.86	2.11	94.96	1715.59	183.59	1994.13
Ohio	Cleveland Heights	43,853	1552.92	6.84	38.77	47.89	157.34	250.84	2.28	166.47	754.79	378.54	1299.80
Ohio	Colerain Township	58,402	2191.71	1.71	34.25	51.37	164.38	251.70	10.27	145.54	1541.04	243.14	1929.73
Ohio	Cuyahoga Falls	50,639	2022.16	0.00	27.65	9.87	136.26	173.78	1.97	124.41	1633.13	88.86	1846.40
Ohio	Delaware	46,369	1147.32	2.16	28.04	15.10	101.36	146.65	10.78	73.32	860.49	56.07	989.89
Ohio	Dublin	48,784	1026.98	0.00	12.30	12.30	84.04	108.64	2.05	102.49	682.60	131.19	916.28
Ohio	Elyria	53,263	1783.60	3.75	46.94	28.16	212.15	291.01	13.14	210.28	1188.44	80.73	1479.45
Ohio	Euclid	48,176	1463.38	14.53	41.51	58.12	103.79	217.95	10.38	101.71	840.67	292.68	1235.05
Ohio	Fairfield	44,296	1666.06	0.00	20.32	9.03	137.71	167.06	6.77	94.82	1234.87	162.54	1492.23
Ohio	Findlay	40,089	1950.66	4.99	92.29	27.44	189.58	314.30	2.49	144.68	1449.28	39.91	1633.86
Ohio	Green Township	59,412	1314.55	1.68	13.47	20.20	77.43	112.77	1.68	122.87	971.18	106.04	1200.09
Ohio	Grove City	43,284	2790.87	0.00	43.90	20.79	64.69	129.38	9.24	131.69	2319.56	201.00	2652.25
Ohio	Huber Heights	43,269	1987.57	0.00	43.91	20.80	124.80	189.51	0.00	154.85	1407.47	235.73	1798.05
Ohio	Jackson Township	42,924	2185.26	0.00	55.91	25.63	130.46	212.00	4.66	144.44	1730.97	93.19	1968.60
Ohio	Kettering	56,562	1548.74	0.00	17.68	12.38	12.38	42.43	5.30	155.58	1196.92	148.51	1501.01
Ohio	Lakewood	49,272	1286.73	0.00	14.21	16.24	111.63	142.07	4.06	109.60	895.03	135.98	1140.61
Ohio	Lancaster	41,687	2552.35	11.99	86.36	16.79	290.26	405.40	21.59	194.31	1808.72	122.34	2125.36
Ohio	Mentor	46,765	1473.32	0.00	21.38	2.14	91.95	115.47	0.00	44.91	1268.04	44.91	1357.85
Ohio	Miami Township	44,929	863.58	4.45	24.48	0.00	55.64	84.58	0.00	40.06	689.98	48.97	779.01
Ohio	Newark	51,394	1934.08	3.89	31.13	31.13	215.98	282.13	25.29	229.60	1219.99	177.06	1626.65
Ohio	Reynoldsburg	41,277	2890.23	2.42	77.53	70.26	329.48	479.69	12.11	138.09	1972.04	288.30	2398.43
Ohio	Springfield	57,911	5993.68	6.91	74.25	238.30	1051.61	1371.07	107.06	894.48	2833.66	787.42	4515.55
Ohio	Strongsville	45,600	1355.26	0.00	19.74	6.58	46.05	72.37	0.00	50.44	1192.98	39.47	1282.89
Ohio	Youngstown	58,850	3469.84	18.69	42.48	90.06	536.96	688.19	28.89	565.85	1711.13	475.79	2752.76
Oklahoma	Enid	50,382	2943.51	0.00	103.21	31.76	402.92	537.89	21.83	631.18	1599.78	152.83	2383.79
Oklahoma	Midwest City	57,961	2443.02	6.90	37.96	36.23	265.70	346.78	15.53	262.25	1590.72	227.74	2080.71
Oklahoma	Owasso	42,134	1540.32	2.37	37.97	4.75	78.32	123.42	7.12	125.79	1205.68	78.32	1409.79
Oklahoma	Stillwater	49,910	1741.13	0.00	42.08	12.02	128.23	182.33	8.01	208.38	1244.24	98.18	1550.79
Oregon	Albany	57,179	2065.44	0.00	38.48	36.73	120.67	195.88	38.48	164.40	1582.75	83.95	1831.09
Oregon	Tigard	55,784	3800.37	0.00	35.85	91.42	190.02	317.30	19.72	369.28	2904.06	190.02	3463.36
Pennsylvania	Abington Township	58,429	2199.25	0.00	13.69	49.63	61.61	124.94	6.85	47.92	1892.90	126.65	2067.47
Pennsylvania	Altoona	42,424	2208.66	2.36	75.43	73.07	183.86	334.72	23.57	332.36	1402.51	115.50	1850.37
Pennsylvania	Bristol Township	53,784	1751.45	0.00	39.05	48.34	63.22	150.60	5.58	96.68	1268.04	230.55	1595.27
Pennsylvania	Harrisburg	49,985	2760.83	30.01	54.02	164.05	514.15	762.23	6.00	334.10	1172.35	486.15	1992.60
Pennsylvania	Haverford Township	50,544	1048.59	0.00	1.98	3.96	15.83	21.76	0.00	27.70	919.99	79.14	1026.83
Pennsylvania	Middletown Township	45,516	465.77	2.20	2.20	4.39	6.59	15.38	2.20	13.18	349.33	85.68	448.19
Pennsylvania	Millcreek Township	52,803	876.84	0.00	11.36	11.36	149.61	172.34	1.89	60.60	617.39	24.62	702.61
Pennsylvania	State College	57,580	920.46	0.00	74.68	10.42	67.73	152.83	3.47	48.63	696.42	19.10	764.15
Pennsylvania	Wilkes-Barre	44,254	1999.82	9.04	42.93	56.49	323.13	431.60	11.30	164.96	1281.24	110.72	1556.92
Pennsylvania	York	44,893	2416.86	11.14	40.10	151.47	327.45	530.15	24.50	309.63	1338.74	213.84	1862.21
Rhode Island	East Providence	47,555	759.12	0.00	37.85	8.41	27.34	73.60	4.21	60.98	542.53	77.80	681.32
Rhode Island	Woonsocket	43,776	1928.00	4.57	59.39	79.95	246.71	390.62	36.55	185.03	1130.76	185.03	1500.82
South Carolina	Florence	40,781	4749.76	14.71	34.33	56.40	701.31	806.75	24.52	306.52	3271.13	340.85	3918.49
South Carolina	Goose Creek	50,294	1725.85	7.95	35.79	29.82	182.92	256.49	3.98	252.52	1083.63	129.24	1465.38
South Carolina	Greer	47,690	2078.00	2.10	41.94	20.97	278.88	343.89	6.29	125.81	1411.20	190.82	1727.83
South Carolina	Myrtle Beach	41,022	6796.35	12.19	185.27	173.08	741.07	1111.60	29.25	446.10	4814.49	394.91	5655.50
South Carolina	Summerville	52,148	1996.24	3.84	17.26	21.09	180.26	222.44	5.75	97.80	1545.60	124.65	1768.04
South Carolina	Sumter	42,551	4813.05	23.50	23.50	65.80	984.70	1097.51	9.40	340.77	2874.20	491.18	3706.14
Tennessee	Bartlett	55,494	1540.71	0.00	9.01	16.22	225.25	250.48	7.21	91.90	955.06	236.06	1283.02
Tennessee	Brentwood	45,208	791.90	0.00	11.06	6.64	39.82	57.51	4.42	66.36	628.21	35.39	729.96
Tennessee	Cleveland	49,482	2853.56	4.04	18.19	62.65	367.81	452.69	16.17	272.83	1962.33	149.55	2384.71
Tennessee	Collierville	51,312	1420.72	0.00	3.90	15.59	130.57	150.06	1.95	95.49	1064.08	109.14	1268.71
Tennessee	Columbia	49,374	3062.34	12.15	52.66	32.41	475.96	573.18	2.03	923.56	1403.57	160.00	2487.14
Tennessee	Gallatin	52,346	957.09	1.91	15.28	13.37	177.66	208.23	0.00	49.67	628.51	70.68	748.86
Tennessee	Kingsport	57,138	3414.54	3.50	47.25	36.75	353.53	441.04	14.00	315.03	2341.70	302.78	2959.50
Tennessee	Lebanon	51,653	1384.24	5.81	36.78	9.68	292.34	344.61	5.81	135.52	803.44	94.86	1033.82
Tennessee	Mount Juliet	44,049	1126.02	0.00	11.35	2.27	145.29	158.91	2.27	31.78	871.76	61.30	964.83
Tennessee	Smyrna	58,791	2668.78	1.70	28.92	34.02	214.32	278.95	3.40	164.99	1867.63	353.80	2386.42
Tennessee	Spring Hill	59,921	662.54	0.00	6.68	8.34	148.53	163.55	0.00	90.12	373.83	35.05	498.99
Texas	Bedford	47,900	1697.29	4.18	20.88	25.05	93.95	144.05	6.26	156.58	1164.93	225.47	1546.97
Texas	Burleson	57,868	1264.95	1.73	44.93	17.28	107.14	171.08	5.18	76.04	850.21	162.44	1088.68
Texas	Cedar Hill	48,911	1954.57	6.13	32.71	36.80	104.27	179.92	2.04	134.94	1361.66	276.01	1772.61
Texas	Coppell	41,549	929.02	0.00	19.25	14.44	69.80	103.49	0.00	52.95	724.45	48.14	825.53
Texas	DeSoto	56,488	1972.10	1.77	47.80	56.65	219.52	325.73	3.54	175.26	1134.75	332.81	1642.83
Texas	Euless	59,230	2301.20	1.69	35.46	45.59	104.68	187.41	8.44	182.34	1671.45	251.56	2105.35
Texas	Forney	40,484	807.73	4.94	12.35	14.82	123.51	155.62	0.00	108.68	422.39	121.04	652.11
Texas	Friendswood	40,763	645.19	0.00	44.16	7.36	49.06	100.58	0.00	51.52	429.31	63.78	544.61
Texas	Galveston	53,100	2917.14	5.65	150.66	107.34	273.07	536.72	0.00	261.77	1853.11	265.54	2380.41
Texas	Grapevine	50,983	2243.89	1.96	33.34	7.85	135.34	178.49	0.00	141.22	1537.77	386.40	2065.39
Texas	Haltom City	45,059	2081.72	2.22	35.51	35.51	201.96	275.19	6.66	304.05	1262.79	233.03	1799.86
Texas	Huntsville	49,446	2060.83	6.07	34.38	50.56	422.68	513.69	16.18	192.13	1191.20	147.64	1530.96
Texas	Hutto	43,212	1092.29	0.00	18.51	4.63	34.71	57.85	0.00	263.82	722.02	48.60	1034.43
Texas	Keller	46,523	735.12	0.00	30.09	6.45	40.84	77.38	2.15	62.33	565.31	27.94	655.59
Texas	Lancaster	40,486	3549.38	14.82	39.52	69.16	286.52	410.02	12.35	871.91	1721.58	533.52	3127.01
Texas	Midlothian	43,497	1078.24	2.30	18.39	6.90	91.96	119.55	0.00	68.97	802.35	87.36	958.69
Texas	Port Arthur	55,397	2260.05	10.83	68.60	108.31	530.71	718.45	1.81	415.18	913.41	211.20	1539.79
Texas	Prosper	46,065	1057.20	0.00	17.37	0.00	36.90	54.27	4.34	108.54	833.60	56.44	998.59
Texas	Rockwall	54,765	1519.22	1.83	16.43	14.61	113.21	146.08	0.00	116.86	1170.46	85.82	1373.14
Texas	Rosenberg	42,035	1722.37	0.00	66.61	19.03	152.25	237.90	2.38	137.98	1175.21	168.91	1482.10
Texas	Schertz	43,611	1043.31	0.00	20.64	13.76	119.24	153.63	2.29	121.53	635.16	130.70	887.39
Texas	Sherman	48,711	2280.80	2.05	69.80	36.95	244.30	353.10	14.37	597.40	1139.37	176.55	1913.33
Texas	Texas City	58,130	2556.34	8.60	94.62	36.13	199.55	338.90	1.72	340.62	1701.36	173.75	2215.72
Texas	The Colony	45,708	1568.65	2.19	39.38	17.50	131.27	190.34	0.00	131.27	1109.22	137.83	1378.31
Texas	Waxahachie	49,223	1795.91	4.06	50.79	10.16	158.46	223.47	2.03	121.89	1285.98	162.53	1570.40
Texas	Weatherford	40,765	1712.25	2.45	49.06	9.81	110.39	171.72	0.00	139.83	1297.68	103.03	1540.54
Texas	Weslaco	43,898	3929.56	0.00	70.62	95.68	300.70	466.99	13.67	209.58	3009.25	230.08	3448.90
Utah	American Fork, Cedar Hills	50,121	1580.18	5.99	55.86	11.97	45.89	119.71	2.00	103.75	1266.93	87.79	1458.47
Utah	Cedar City	41,556	1159.88	2.41	43.32	4.81	96.26	146.79	0.00	105.88	825.39	81.82	1013.09
Utah	Draper	49,166	1281.37	2.03	73.22	16.27	79.32	170.85	8.14	128.14	892.89	81.36	1102.39
Utah	Logan	56,083	1271.33	0.00	48.14	7.13	82.02	137.30	3.57	140.86	911.15	78.46	1130.47
Utah	Murray	49,238	3623.22	10.15	60.93	85.30	121.86	278.24	26.40	333.08	2536.66	448.84	3318.58
Utah	Riverton	44,711	968.44	2.24	22.37	4.47	42.50	71.57	0.00	60.39	782.81	53.68	896.87
Utah	Saratoga Springs	58,400	666.10	1.71	32.53	0.00	56.51	90.75	0.00	32.53	522.26	20.55	575.34
Utah	Spanish Fork	46,536	784.34	0.00	36.53	0.00	38.68	75.21	4.30	53.72	618.88	32.23	704.83
Utah	Taylorsville City	56,047	2041.14	3.57	33.90	37.47	94.56	169.50	5.35	158.80	1518.37	189.13	1866.29
Utah	Tooele	40,402	1710.31	7.43	113.86	12.38	215.34	348.99	4.95	133.66	1153.41	69.30	1356.37
Vermont	Burlington	44,456	4791.25	2.25	20.24	53.99	402.65	479.13	22.49	384.65	3716.03	188.95	4289.63
Virginia	Blacksburg	45,734	791.53	0.00	41.54	2.19	32.80	76.53	0.00	67.78	623.17	24.05	715.00
Virginia	Charlottesville	44,844	3554.54	2.23	42.37	60.21	254.21	359.02	4.46	240.83	2660.33	289.89	3191.06
Virginia	Danville	41,915	3223.19	21.47	35.79	52.49	255.28	365.02	23.86	219.49	2457.35	157.46	2834.31
Virginia	Harrisonburg	51,270	1966.06	0.00	56.56	21.46	189.19	267.21	5.85	134.58	1472.60	85.82	1693.00
Virginia	Leesburg	49,626	1829.69	0.00	32.24	34.26	189.42	255.91	0.00	76.57	1440.78	56.42	1573.77
Virginia	Manassas	43,028	2179.98	2.32	81.34	41.83	148.74	274.24	0.00	99.93	1643.12	162.68	1905.74
Washington	Bothell	50,917	1478.88	0.00	23.57	21.60	64.81	109.98	0.00	223.89	997.70	147.30	1368.89
Washington	Bremerton	46,079	3285.66	4.34	106.34	47.74	275.61	434.04	36.89	499.14	1931.47	384.12	2814.73
Washington	Burien	50,318	3853.49	3.97	65.58	162.96	192.77	425.30	33.79	576.33	1752.85	1065.23	3394.41
Washington	Edmonds	42,659	3263.09	2.34	37.51	51.57	168.78	260.20	2.34	412.57	2435.59	152.37	3000.54
Washington	Lacey	58,872	2661.71	3.40	20.38	33.97	129.09	186.85	6.79	380.49	1883.75	203.83	2468.07
Washington	Lake Stevens	41,000	765.85	0.00	34.15	17.07	65.85	117.07	0.00	53.66	504.88	90.24	648.78
Washington	Lynnwood	45,807	6339.64	8.73	26.20	106.97	122.25	264.15	10.92	504.29	4986.14	574.15	6064.58
Washington	Olympia	55,775	4014.34	7.17	62.75	109.37	385.48	564.77	14.34	568.35	2495.74	371.13	3435.23
Washington	Puyallup	41,898	4272.28	2.39	33.41	85.92	253.00	374.72	28.64	448.71	2572.92	847.30	3868.92
West Virginia	Charleston	46,252	3690.65	12.97	58.38	54.05	417.28	542.68	28.11	655.11	2280.98	183.78	3119.87
West Virginia	Huntington	44,860	4418.19	13.37	102.54	104.77	579.58	800.27	15.60	606.33	2661.61	334.37	3602.32
Wisconsin	Brookfield	42,019	1180.42	0.00	2.38	26.18	54.74	83.30	0.00	107.09	940.05	49.98	1097.12
Wisconsin	Fond du Lac	44,164	2497.51	4.53	67.93	29.44	285.30	387.19	6.79	92.84	1954.08	56.61	2103.52
Wisconsin	La Crosse	50,893	4108.62	1.96	78.60	25.54	284.91	391.02	5.89	279.02	3269.60	163.09	3711.71
Wisconsin	Menomonee Falls	40,076	596.37	4.99	14.97	9.98	37.43	67.37	0.00	52.40	436.67	39.92	528.99
Wisconsin	New Berlin	40,186	1057.58	2.49	24.88	2.49	32.35	62.21	2.49	44.79	918.23	29.86	992.88
Wisconsin	Sheboygan	49,610	1719.41	4.03	102.80	6.05	314.45	427.33	4.03	88.69	1157.02	42.33	1288.05
Wisconsin	Wauwatosa	46,968	2693.32	0.00	14.90	48.97	142.65	206.52	4.26	149.04	2007.75	325.75	2482.54
Wisconsin	West Allis	58,862	2244.23	0.00	23.78	74.75	158.00	256.53	10.19	190.28	1478.03	309.20	1977.51
Wyoming	Casper	58,526	2409.19	6.83	56.39	15.38	210.16	288.76	8.54	247.75	1684.72	179.41	2111.88

Notes:

^{1} The FBI does not publish arson data unless it receives data from either the agency or the state for all 12 months of the calendar year.
^{2} Because of changes in this agency's reporting practices, figures are not comparable to previous years' data.
^{3} Limited data for 2024 were available for Florida.

== Criticism of ranking crime data ==
The FBI web site recommends against using its data for ranking because these rankings lead to simplistic and/or incomplete analyses that often create misleading perceptions adversely affecting cities and counties, along with their residents. The FBI web site also recommends against using its data to judge how effective law enforcement agencies are, since there are many factors that influence crime rates other than law enforcement.

In November 2007, the executive board of the American Society of Criminology (ASC) went further than the FBI itself, and approved a resolution opposing not only the use of the ratings to judge police departments, but also opposing any development of city crime rankings from FBI Uniform Crime Reports (UCRs) at all. The resolution opposed these rankings on the grounds that they "fail to account for the many conditions affecting crime rates" and "divert attention from the individual and community characteristics that elevate crime in all cities", though it did not provide sources or further elaborate on these claims. The resolution states the rankings "represent an irresponsible misuse of the data and do groundless harm to many communities" and "work against a key goal of our society, which is a better understanding of crime-related issues by both scientists and the public".

The U.S. Conference of Mayors passed a similar statement, which also committed the Conference to working with the FBI and the U.S. Department of Justice "to educate reporters, elected officials, and citizens on what the (UCR) data means and doesn't mean."

== Criticism of comparing crime rates ==
Crime rates per capita might also be biased by population size depending on the crime type. This misrepresentation occurs because rates per capita assume that crime increases at the same pace as the number of people in an area. When this linear assumption does not hold, rates per capita still have population effects. In these nonlinear cases, per capita rates can inflate or deflate the representation of crime in cities, introducing an artifactual bias into rankings. Therefore, it is necessary to test for linearity before comparing crime rates of cities of different sizes.

== Other cities rates ==
- United States cities by crime rate, populations 250,000+
- United States cities by crime rate (60,000-100,000)
- United States cities by crime rate (100,000 - 250,000)
