= Keller, Texas =

City in Texas, United States

- City
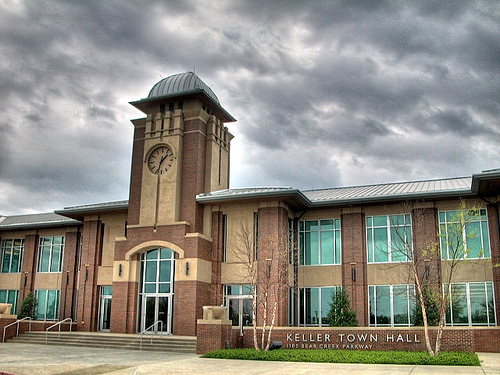
- Keller Town Hall

- Flag

- Location within Tarrant County and Texas
- Coordinates: 32°55′39″N 97°14′10″W
- Country: United States
- State: Texas
- County: Tarrant

Government
  - Type: Council-Manager
  - Mayor: Ross McMullin
  - City Council: Shannon Dubberly; Gregory Will; Karen Brennan; Jarrett Armstrong; Chris Whatley; Charles Randklev

Area
  - Total: 18.50 sq mi (47.92 km^{2})
  - Land: 18.45 sq mi (47.79 km^{2})
  - Water: 0.050 sq mi (0.13 km^{2})
- Elevation: 656 ft (200 m)

Population (2020)
  - Total: 45,776
  - Estimate (2021): 50,000
  - Density: 2,558.7/sq mi (987.92/km^{2})
- Time zone: UTC-6 (CST)
  - Summer (DST): UTC-5 (CDT)
- ZIP codes: 76248, 76262, 76180
- Area code: 817 682
- FIPS code: 48-38632
- GNIS feature ID: 2410172
- Website: CityOfKeller.com

Keller is a city in Tarrant County, Texas, United States, in the Dallas–Fort Worth metroplex. According to the 2020 census, the city's population is 45,776, making Keller the 78th-most populated city in Texas. The most recent population estimate, as of July 1, 2021, is 45,397.

In the early 1850s, settlers established Keller and the town became a stop on the Texas and Pacific Railway. The settlers settled around the wooded region in Keller because of Keller's proximity to the Trinity River water supply and abundant farmland. On November 16, 1955, Keller became incorporated.

Keller is mostly residential, featuring more than 300 acres (120 ha) of developed land for 11 park sites and more than 26 miles of hiking and biking trails.

== History ==
=== Before establishment ===
Keller is in the western fringe of the Eastern Cross Timbers in northeast Tarrant County, part of the frontier of the Peters Colony settlers of the 1840s. In the mid-1840s, the area was first settled by a group of families from Missouri who homesteaded near the headwaters of Big Bear Creek. Mount Gilead Baptist Church was established on July 13, 1850. In 1859, the little log church was burned in an Indian raid. It served as the only schoolhouse in that part of the county until about 1910.

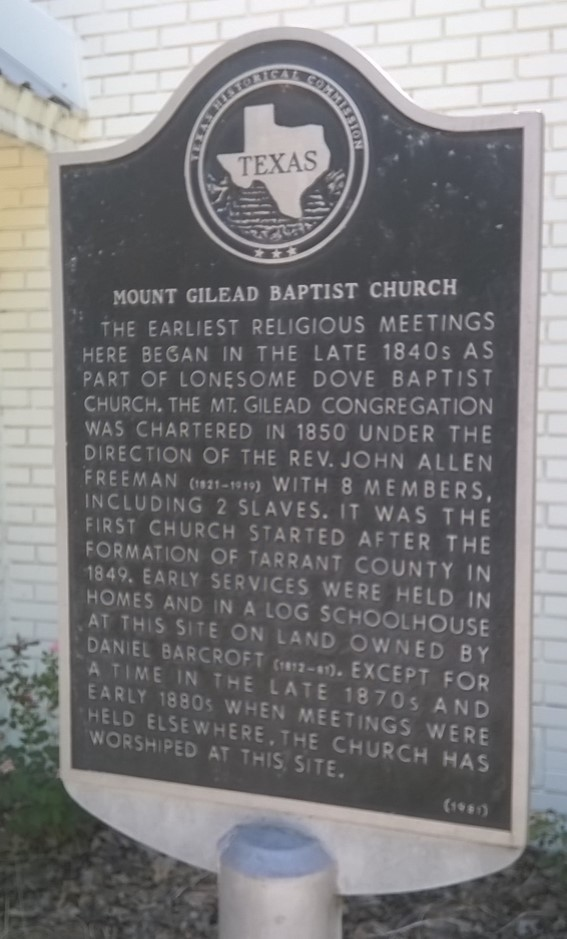
Mount Gilead Baptist Church was established in 1850

The area became known as "Double Springs" for the two large springs about 1/2 mile north of Mt. Gilead Baptist Church. In the early 1870s, the Double Springs area had a cotton gin, a grist mill, a blacksmith shop, and several stores. In 1896, an artesian well was drilled in Keller; the Double Springs filled with silt over time and eventually were plugged and lost until rediscovery in 1984. Today, Samantha Springs produces more than 200,000 gallons of water per day.

=== Establishment of Keller ===
The Texas and Pacific Railway between Fort Worth and Texarkana was completed in June 1881, and the first train ran on this track on May 9, 1881, which ran parallel with parts of the old Chisholm cattle drive trail. With the advent of rail service, new villages were established all along the line. The Keller of today was one of them. On July 19, 1881, H.W. Black, a druggist of Tarrant County, set aside 40 acres (0.16 km^{2}) out of the north end of the 62 acres (0.25 km^{2}) deeded to him by A.C. Roberts (being a part of the Samuel Needham survey) for a town site to be known as Athol, situated 14 miles (23 km) northeast of Fort Worth. The land was dedicated to the public for streets and alleyways, but title to the remainder of the 62 acres (0.25 km^{2}) was held by Mr. Black. Settlers migrated to the new village, and before a year had passed, the name of the town was changed from Athol to Keller, honoring John C. Keller, a foreman on the railroad. Streets were named and those in the original 40-acre (0.16 km^{2}) site still carry the names given to them in 1881. Streets going north and south are Lamar, Main, and Elm; those running east and west are Price, Taylor, Hill, Vine, Bates, Olive, and Pecan.

=== Modern Keller ===
The U.S. Census Bureau's American Community Survey listed Keller as one of the "Nation's Richest Cities" with a population over 20,000 in 2021, ranked number 45 with median household income of $141,364. Neighboring Southlake was ranked number one.

== Geography ==
According to the United States Census Bureau, the city has a total area of 18.4 square miles (47.8 km^{2}). Keller is east of Interstate 35W, south of Highway 114 and Alliance Gate Freeway.

=== Surrounding cities ===
Fort Worth, Southlake, and Roanoke are included in the list cities surrounding the City of Keller, which are located in either Denton or Tarrant County.

=== Climate ===
The climate in this area is characterized by hot, humid summers and generally mild to cool winters. According to the Köppen climate classification, Keller has a humid subtropical climate, Cfa on climate maps.

Keller, Texas

Climate chart (precipitation, max. and min. temperature)
J	F	M	A	M	J	J	A	S	O	N	D
2.1 57 35	2.1 60 39	3.1 68 46	3.6 76 54	4 83 64	4.1 90 71	2.3 95 75	2.3 95 75	2.7 88 67	3.3 78 56	2.1 67 46	1.9 57 37
- █ Average max. and min. temperatures in °F
- █ Precipitation totals in inches
- Source: NWS, Ft Worth TX
Metric conversion
J	F	M	A	M	J	J	A	S	O	N	D
54 14 2	53 16 4	78 20 8	91 24 12	101 28 18	105 32 22	58 35 24	59 35 24	69 31 19	85 26 13	52 19 8	49 14 3
- █ Average max. and min. temperatures in °C
- █ Precipitation totals in mm

Climate data for Keller, Texas
Month	Jan	Feb	Mar	Apr	May	Jun	Jul	Aug	Sep	Oct	Nov	Dec	Year
Record high °F (°C)	86 (30)	90 (32)	95 (35)	100 (38)	102 (39)	108 (42)	109 (43)	112 (44)	112 (44)	99 (37)	89 (32)	90 (32)	112 (44)
Mean daily maximum °F (°C)	56.5 (13.6)	60.3 (15.7)	68.0 (20.0)	75.8 (24.3)	83.1 (28.4)	90.4 (32.4)	94.5 (34.7)	94.8 (34.9)	87.5 (30.8)	77.6 (25.3)	66.5 (19.2)	57.1 (13.9)	76.0 (24.4)
Mean daily minimum °F (°C)	35.4 (1.9)	39.3 (4.1)	46.2 (7.9)	54.4 (12.4)	63.6 (17.6)	70.9 (21.6)	74.7 (23.7)	74.9 (23.8)	67.1 (19.5)	56.3 (13.5)	45.7 (7.6)	36.6 (2.6)	55.4 (13.0)
Average precipitation inches (mm)	2.12 (54)	2.09 (53)	3.09 (78)	3.60 (91)	3.96 (101)	4.12 (105)	2.28 (58)	2.33 (59)	2.71 (69)	3.33 (85)	2.05 (52)	1.93 (49)	33.61 (854)
Average snowfall inches (cm)	0.3 (0.76)	0.3 (0.76)	0.3 (0.76)	0.0 (0.0)	0.0 (0.0)	0.0 (0.0)	0.0 (0.0)	0.0 (0.0)	0.0 (0.0)	0.0 (0.0)	0.1 (0.25)	1.4 (3.6)	2.4 (6.13)
Average precipitation days (≥ 0.01 in)	6	6	8	7	9	7	6	4	6	7	5	6	77
Average snowy days (≥ 0.1 in)	0	2	1	0	0	0	0	0	0	0	0	1	4
Source: National Weather Service Forecast Office, Fort Worth TX

== Demographics ==
Historical population
Census	Pop.	Note	%±
1960	827		—
1970	1,474		78.2%
1980	4,156		182.0%
1990	13,683		229.2%
2000	27,345		99.8%
2010	39,627		44.9%
2020	45,776		15.5%
2024 (est.)	46,643		1.9%
U.S. Decennial Census

As of the 2020 census, 45,776 people, 16,383 households, and 13,148 families resided in the city.

=== Racial and ethnic composition ===
Racial composition as of the 2020 census
Race	Number	Percent
White	35,410	77.4%
Black or African American	1,407	3.1%
American Indian and Alaska Native	241	0.5%
Asian	3,191	7.0%
Native Hawaiian and Other Pacific Islander	28	0.1%
Some other race	1,049	2.3%
Two or more races	4,450	9.7%
Hispanic or Latino (of any race)	4,696	10.3%

=== 2020 census ===
The median age was 42.8 years, with 25.8% of residents under the age of 18 and 14.9% aged 65 or older; for every 100 females, there were 94.9 males, and for every 100 females age 18 and over there were 91.9 males.

100.0% of residents lived in urban areas, while 0.0% lived in rural areas.

There were 15,670 households in Keller, of which 40.4% had children under the age of 18 living in them; 71.6% were married-couple households, 8.9% were households with a male householder and no spouse or partner present, and 17.1% were households with a female householder and no spouse or partner present. About 15.4% of all households were made up of individuals and 7.9% had someone living alone who was 65 years of age or older.

There were 16,129 housing units, of which 2.8% were vacant; the homeowner vacancy rate was 0.9% and the rental vacancy rate was 5.4%.

== Government ==
=== City government ===
The City of Keller is a full-service city, providing police, fire and emergency services, parks and recreation, library, senior center, animal control, planning, building inspection, economic development, public works, street maintenance, water, wastewater, drainage, and solid waste disposal. Organized under the council-manager form of government, the Keller city council has seven representatives elected at-large and responsible for enacting local legislation, setting policies, and adopting Keller's annual operating budgets. Keller City Hall is located at 1100 Bear Creek Parkway in Keller Town Center. The current mayor of Keller is Ross McMullin, and the city manager is Aaron Rector.

The Keller Police Department serves the City of Keller and the Town of Westlake. The police department shares a 9-1-1 dispatch center, regional jail, regional animal services, and adoption center with neighboring cities of Southlake, Colleyville, and Westlake. The department consists of five service divisions - patrol, traffic, investigations, confinement, and administrative.

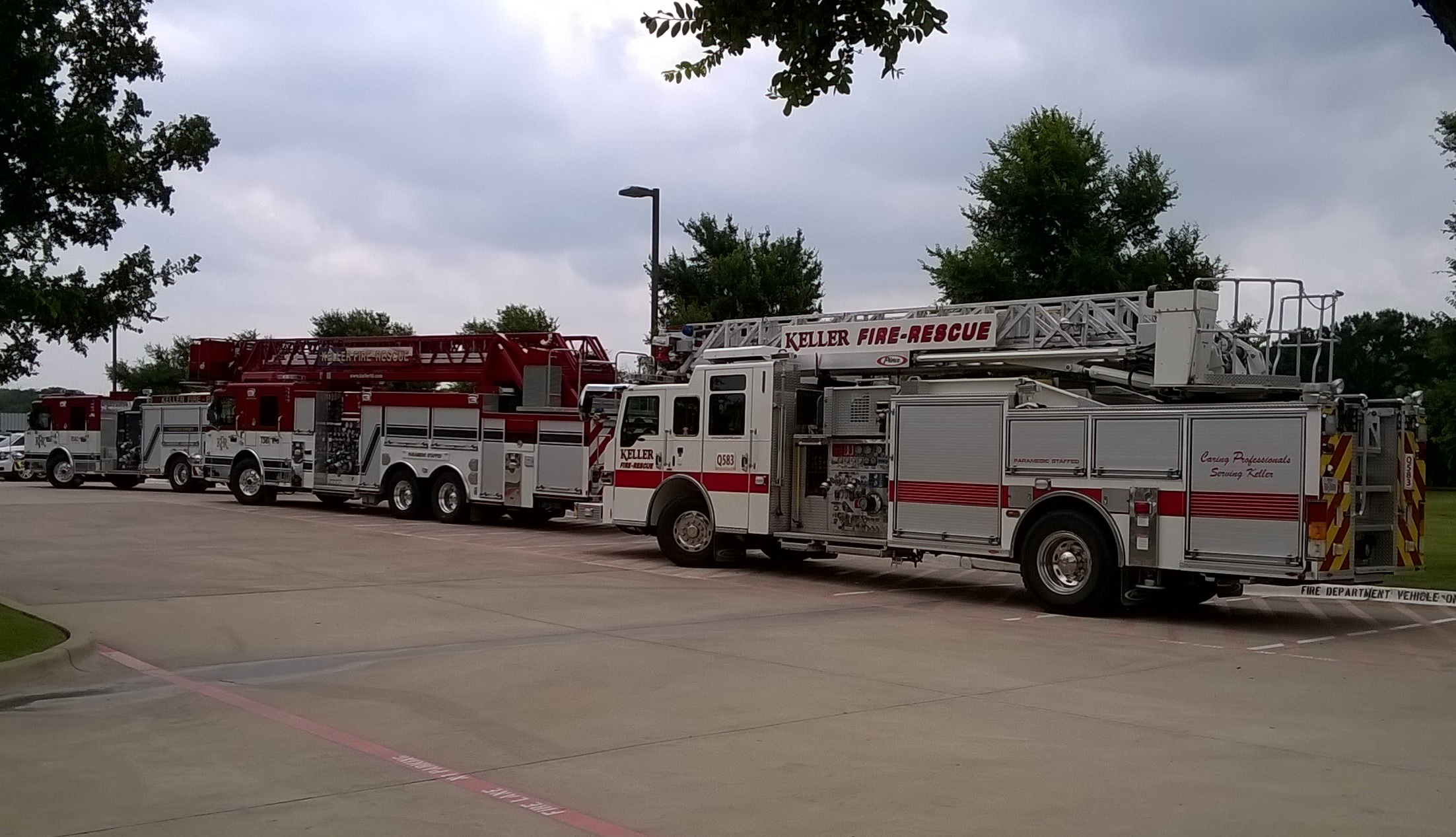
Keller Fire and Rescue

Keller Fire Rescue maintains three fire stations in the city. Firefighters and paramedics provide full-time services for Keller residents, and through mutual aid, neighboring cities. The fire department, like the police department, participates in a shared communications network with Southlake, Colleyville, and Westlake. Unlike the police department, Keller Fire-Rescue does not serve Westlake, as they maintain their own fire department.

The City of Keller is a voluntary member of the North Central Texas Council of Governments association. The member's purpose is to coordinate individual and collective local governments, assist regional solutions, eliminate unnecessary duplication, and enable joint decisions.

The city prides itself as "Texas's Most Family-Friendly City."

=== State representation ===
Republican Representative Giovanni Capriglione of District 98 represents Keller citizens in the Texas House of Representatives. The seat of the 9th Senate district, in which Keller is located, is currently held by Democrat Taylor Rehmet, who will assume office in 2026.

=== Federal representation ===
Republican Senators John Cornyn and Ted Cruz represents Texas in the United States Senate. In the United States House of Representatives, Republican Representative Beth Van Duyne represents the 24th Congressional District of Texas.

== Education ==
The Keller Independent School District has 39 campuses serving more than 34,000 students. Students zoned to Keller ISD attend 23 different elementary schools, 12 different intermediate/middle schools, and five different high schools. Most of the schools within the district are located in northeast Fort Worth. This means Keller's school district is substantially larger than the city itself.

== Infrastructure ==
One source of Keller's bedroom-community serenity comes from having no contact with any interstate highways. U.S. Route 377, a north–south United States highway runs along Keller's western border, parallel to Interstate 35W. Davis Boulevard (FM1938), a north–south Farm to Market Road from North Richland Hills to Southlake, runs through Keller. Keller Parkway (FM 1709) runs from Interstate 35W in Fort Worth, where it is named Golden Triangle Boulevard to State Highway 114 (SH 114) in Southlake, where it is named Southlake Boulevard.

In September 2004, Verizon Communications, launched their FiOS fiber-optic communications network; 9,000 customers in Keller, Texas, were the first in the nation. Verizon replaced copper wires with optical fibers, commencing service in 2005.

Keller consistently scores as a very safe city, in United States cities by crime rate (40,000–60,000) in Federal Bureau of Investigation Uniform Crime Reports statistics.

== Notable people ==
- Taylor Ball, actor (Still Standing)
- Jeff Banister, manager of the Texas Rangers from 2015 to 2018
- Joel Bolomboy, basketball player for the Utah Jazz
- Bryce Boneau, soccer player
- Nolan Frese, football long snapper, Seattle Seahawks
- Garrett Hartley, football placekicker, New Orleans Saints
- Jack Mull, baseball player
- Sheldon Neuse, professional baseball player
- Michelle Royer, Miss Texas USA 1987, Miss USA 1987
- Benji Gil, baseball player for the Texas Rangers (baseball) from (1993, 1995–1997), baseball player for the Anaheim Angels from (2000–2003) Champion 2002 World Series, Manager Mexico national baseball team
- Debby Ryan, actress (Jessie)
- Zack Sanchez, Canadian football cornerback for the Saskatchewan Roughriders
- Austen Jewell Smith competitive sports shooter and Olympic medalist
- Hank Thompson, country music entertainer
