= Farm to Market Road 1938 =

State road in Texas

Farm to Market Road 1938
- FM 1938 highlighted in red

Route information
- Maintained by TxDOT
- Length: 11.1 mi (17.9 km)
- Existed: August 24, 1955–present

Major junctions
- South end: SH 26 in North Richland Hills
- I-820 in North Richland Hills
- North end: SH 114 in Westlake

Location
- Country: United States
- State: Texas
- Counties: Tarrant

Highway system
- Highways in Texas; Interstate; US; State; Former; Toll; Loops; Spurs; FM/RM; Park; Rec
← FM 1937	→ FM 1939

Farm to Market Road 1938 (FM 1938) is a Farm to Market Road in the US state of Texas. The highway runs from State Highway 26 (SH 26) to State Highway 114 (SH 114) in Tarrant County. In North Richland Hills, Keller, and Westlake, FM 1938 is named Davis Boulevard, while in Southlake it is known as Randol Mill Avenue. FM 1938 was designated in 1952 in Hockley County, but was cancelled and redesignated in 1955 at its modern location in Tarrant County. In 1995, the entire route of FM 1938 was redesignated as Urban Road 1938 (UR 1938) by the Texas Department of Transportation (TxDOT). In 2012, FM 1938's northern terminus was extended from FM 1709 to the north frontage road of SH 114.

== Route description ==
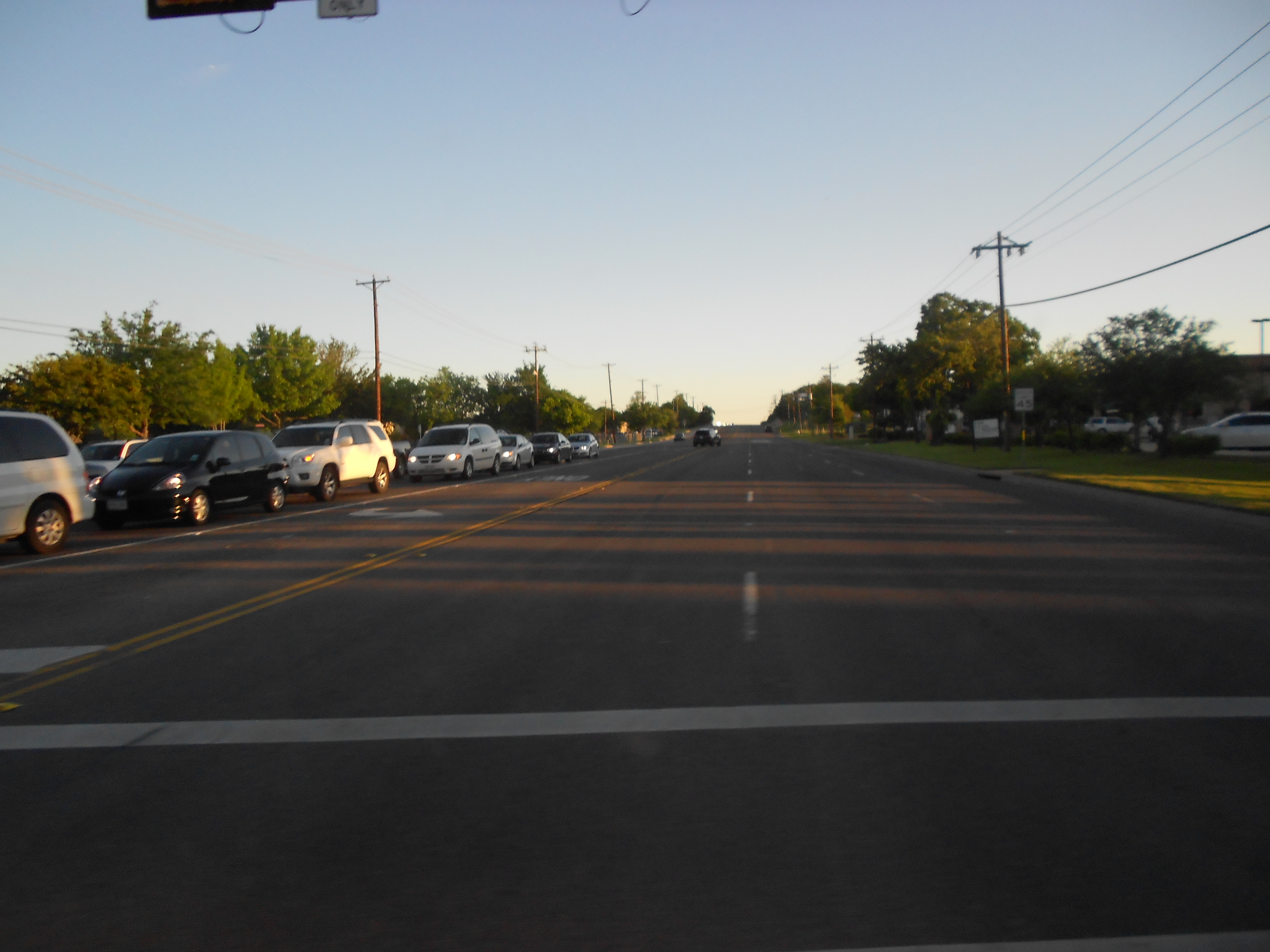
FM 1938 at an intersection with Continental Boulevard, in Southlake

FM 1938 (Davis Boulevard) begins at its southern terminus with SH 26, directly besides the raised Interstate 820 (I-820) freeway. FM 1938 continues on for about 0.2 miles (0.32 km) before two exit ramps coming from I-820 merge with it, giving incomplete access to the freeway. The highway proceeds as a paved, asphalt, six-lane highway, with a center left-turn lane dividing it. The road continues through central North Richland Hills, passing several small businesses and large residential neighborhoods. Along this stretch, FM 1938 is traveling due north. After an intersection with Smithfield Road, the highway turns in a northeastern direction. It continues through North Richland Hills, intersecting with several large roads and passing a set of railroad tracks. The highway heads north for about 5.5 miles (8.85 km) before intersecting with FM 3029 and entering the city of Keller. FM 1938 passes through Keller for about one mile (1.6 km) before passing over Big Bear Creek and entering the city of Southlake. Just after entering Southlake, the highway passes a large landscaping and stone supplies facility. FM 1938 continues through Southlake for approximately one mile (1.6 km), passing several businesses, before reentering Keller for 0.85 miles (1.37 km). There, it passes by a number of neighborhoods and enters Westlake, where it continues for approximately 2 miles (3.22 km) and meets its northern terminus at SH 114. FM 1938 is a major thoroughfare in Westlake and provides access to numerous residential areas and businesses.

== History ==
On January 18, 1952, FM 1938 was designated in Hockley County, traveling from an intersection with FM 1490 to an intersection with Hockley County Road 237 (now FM 303). On November 1, 1954, FM 1938 was cancelled and combined with FM 597 when it was extended. On August 24, 1955, FM 1938 was redesignated for a route in Tarrant County, traveling from FM 1709 to the SH 121 freeway, which was 7.514 miles (12.093 km) long. On June 27, 1995, the entire route was redesignated as Urban Road 1938, although, like other routes like this, the signage did not change. On August 23, 2007, an extension of FM 1938 was authorized from FM 1709 to SH 114, adding approximately 3.6 miles (5.8 km) to the road. The extension to SH 114 opened in August 2012. On November 15, 2018, Urban Road 1938 was redesignated as FM 1938.

== Major junctions ==
The entire route is in Tarrant County.

Location	mi	km	Destinations	Notes
North Richland Hills	0.0	0.0	SH 26	Southern terminus
North Richland Hills	0.2	0.32	I-820	I-820 exit 22A. Access from eastbound I-820, and access to westbound I-820
North Richland Hills	1.6	2.6	CR 3076 (Smithfield Road)	Southern terminus of CR 3076
North Richland Hills	5.2	8.4	CR 3001 (Shady Grove Road)	
North Richland Hills	5.6	9.0	FM 3029	Northern terminus of FM 3029
Southlake	7.5	12.1	FM 1709	
Southlake	7.8	12.6	CR 4091 (Johnson Road)	Eastern terminus of CR 4091
Westlake	11.1	17.9	SH 114	
1.000 mi = 1.609 km; 1.000 km = 0.621 mi
