= Farm to Market Road 1709 =

Road in Texas

Farm to Market Road 1709

Route information
- Maintained by TxDOT
- Length: 11.955 mi (19.240 km)
- Existed: May 23, 1951–present

Major junctions
- West end: I-35W in Fort Worth
- US 377 in Keller; FM 1938 in Southlake
- East end: SH 114 in Southlake

Location
- Country: United States
- State: Texas
- Counties: Tarrant

Highway system
- Highways in Texas; Interstate; US; State; Former; Toll; Loops; Spurs; FM/RM; Park; Rec
← FM 1708	→ FM 1710

Farm to Market Road 1709 (FM 1709) is a Farm to Market Road in the US state of Texas, running from the frontage road along Interstate 35W (I-35W) on the north side of Fort Worth to State Highway 114 (SH 114) in Tarrant County. While located in Fort Worth, FM 1709 is named "Golden Triangle Boulevard". In Keller, the highway is known as "Keller Parkway", and in Southlake, it is known as "Southlake Boulevard". The highway passes through the commercial center of Keller and Southlake, and helps connect residents of the area to businesses and major highways. The highway was designated in the early 1950s and extended in the mid-1980s. In 1995, FM 1709 was internally redesignated Urban Road 1709 (UR 1709) by the Texas Department of Transportation (TxDOT).

== Route description ==
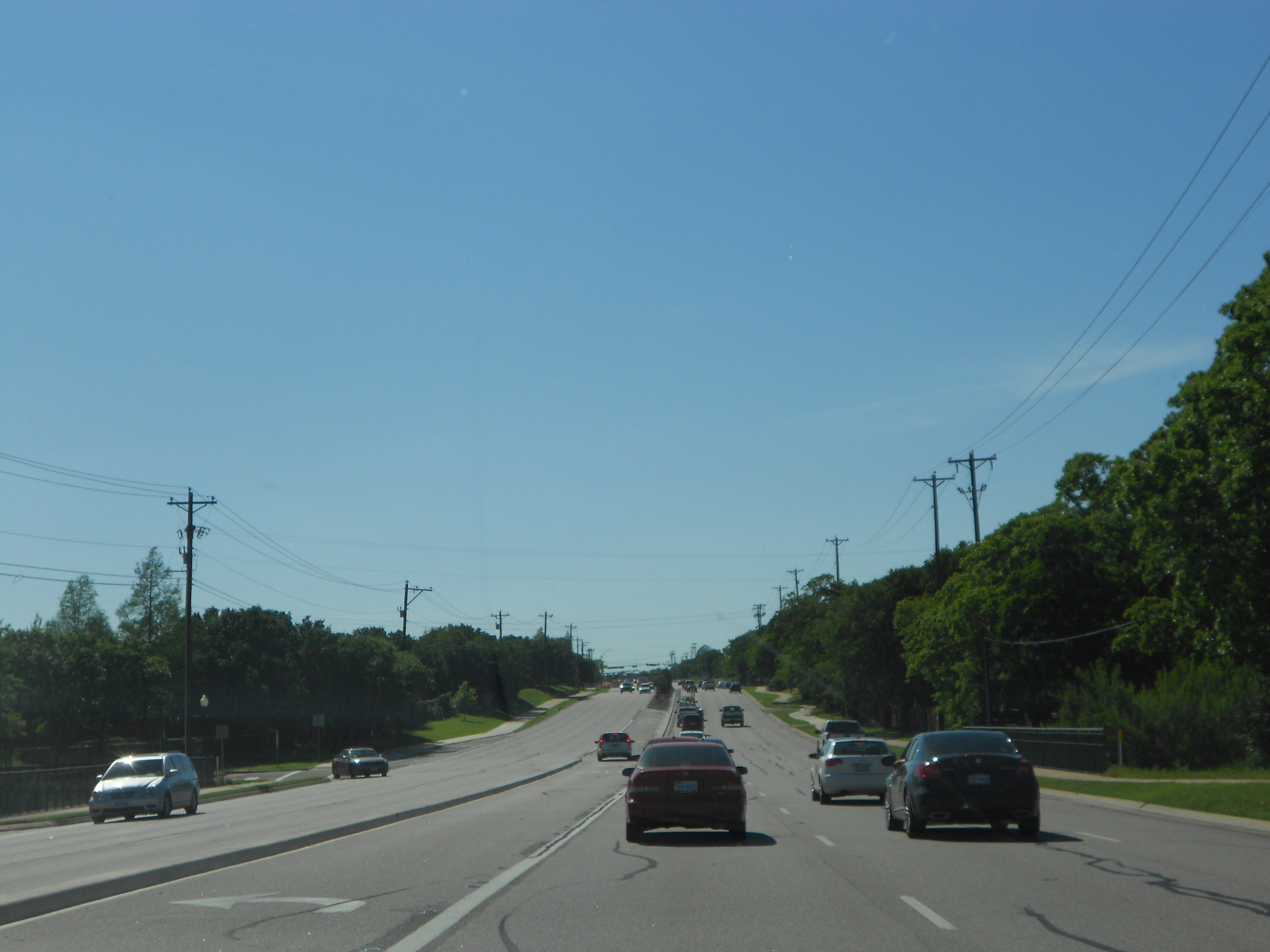
Looking westbound on FM 1709, in Southlake

FM 1709 has a western terminus at the intersection with the I-35W frontage road, heading north. At this point, the road is a four-lane road. From there, FM 1709 passes several small farms and ranches, hence the name "Farm to Market Road". After about a mile or two, the highway runs past a large neighborhood and several small strip malls on the eastern edge of Fort Worth. FM 1709 proceeds into the City of Keller. Just after entering Keller, the road passes TOCA soccer, a large indoor soccer facility. Afterward, the highway intersects with US Highway 377 (US 377), where it becomes a six-lane divided highway. The road proceeds through downtown Keller a commercial area. At its intersection with Pearson Lane (County Road 4041, CR 4041), the highway exits Keller and enters the City of Southlake. FM 1709 goes for a short distance into Southlake before intersecting with Davis Boulevard (FM 1938). After this, the road passes several small shopping centers and other small businesses. After about one-half of a mile (0.80 km) from Davis Boulevard, the route passes Carroll Senior High School.

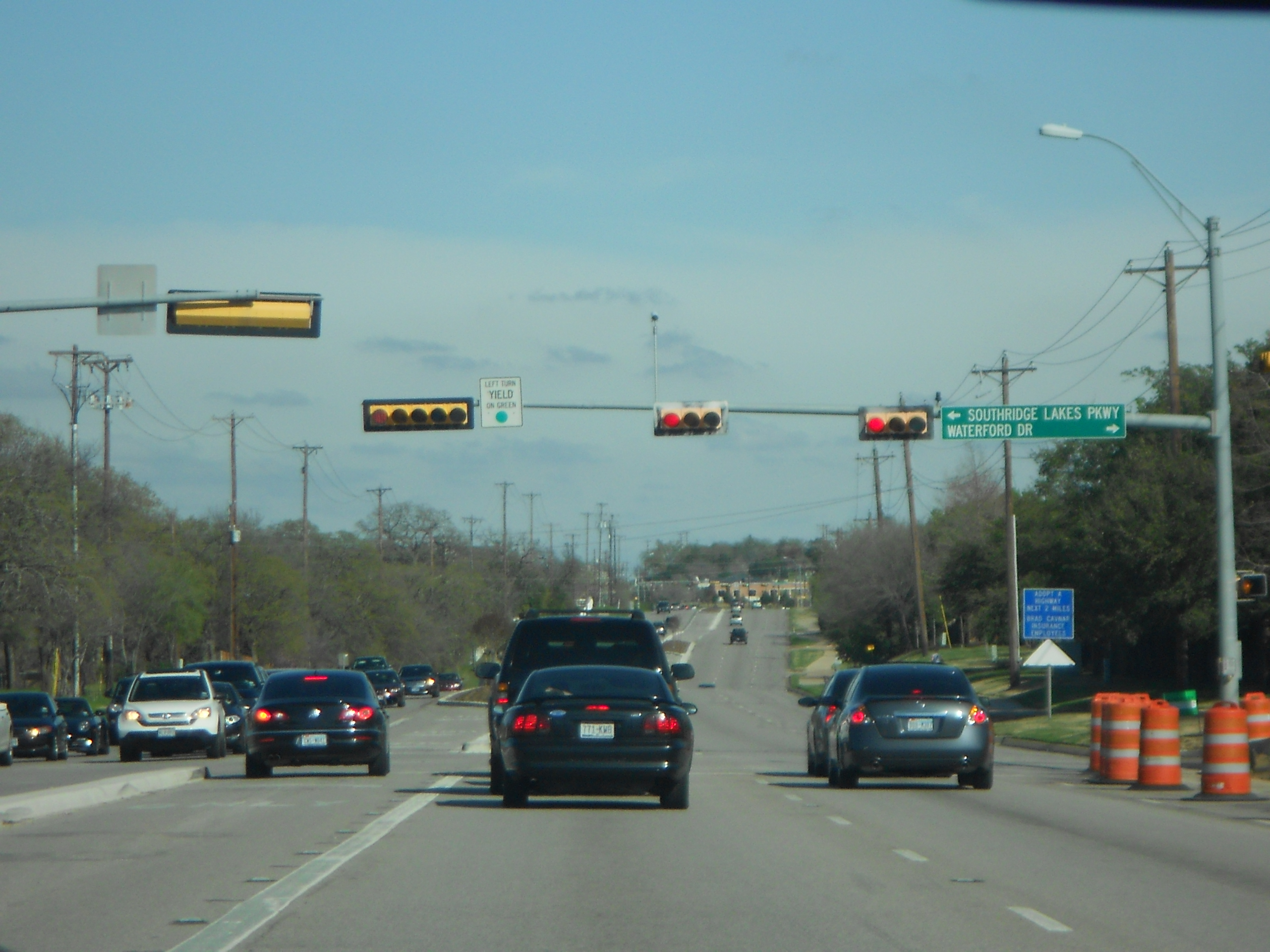
FM 1709 at an intersection in Southlake

The road continues through Southlake, passing several large, expensive neighborhoods. It heads past Bicentennial Park and the small, private Flying Cap Valley Airport, just before passing through Southlake Town Square. The highway proceeds through a small commercial area on the far east edge of Southlake before reaching the route's eastern terminus at the SH 114 frontage road.

== History ==
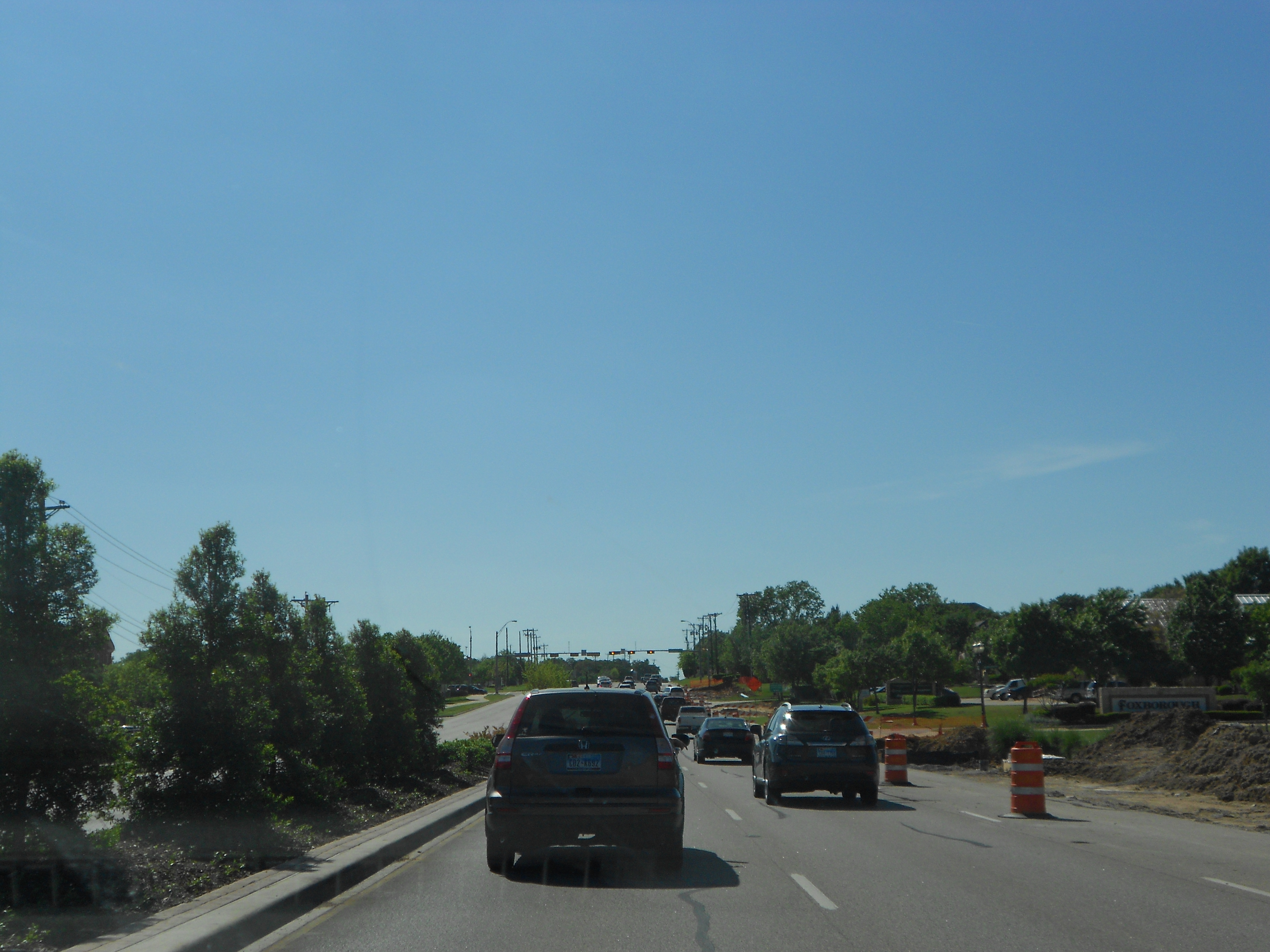
Work on FM 1709 in Southlake

FM 1709 was designated on May 23, 1951 between US 377 and SH 114. An additional section was added on November 25, 1986 to extend the highway westward to I-35W. The stretch of FM 1709 from US 377 in Keller to SH 114 in Southlake was redesignated as UR 1709 on June 27, 1995, but was redesignated back to FM 1709 on November 15, 2018. In November 2010, TxDOT completed a series of raised medians in the Keller portion of FM 1709, from US 377 to CR 4041 (Pearson Lane). In August 2011, a series of medians was completed that went from Pearson Lane to the eastern terminus, the SH 114 frontage road. Both of these projects included the creation of deceleration lanes and sidewalks on FM 1709. As of March 2012, the addition of deceleration lanes, sidewalks, and major landscaping along FM 1709 in Southlake is still ongoing. In October 2010, the cities of Keller and Fort Worth began a project to expand the Golden Triangle Boulevard portion of FM 1709 from two lanes to a four-lane highway with a dividing median. The project is estimated to completed in 2013. As of March 2012, the westbound lanes of FM 1709 traveling from the intersection with US 377 to Old Denton Road, near I-35W have been completed, and the TxDOT has begun construction for the eastbound lanes.

In 2010, the Texas Department of Transportation and Northgate Constructors announced that a portion of FM 1709 will be rebuilt as part of the DFW Connector Project. The portion of FM 1709 traveling from SH 114 westward to Gateway Drive will become one-way, and the eastbound portion of the highway will be designated to Gateway Drive. In 2019, TxDOT started repaving 3.86 miles of the Keller Parkway section of FM 1709, which included adjustments to certain intersections to improve turning.

== Major junctions ==
The entire route is in Tarrant County.

Location	mi	km	Destinations	Notes
Fort Worth	0.0	0.0	I-35W	Western terminus
Keller	3.6	5.8	US 377	
Southlake	7.6	12.2	FM 1938	Northern terminus of FM 1938
Southlake	11.9	19.2	SH 114 / Bus. SH 114	Eastern terminus.
1.000 mi = 1.609 km; 1.000 km = 0.621 mi
