= United States cities by crime rate (60,000–100,000) =

The following table is based on Federal Bureau of Investigation Uniform Crime Reports statistics.

The population numbers are based on U.S. Census estimates for the year end. The number of murders includes nonnegligent manslaughter. This list is based on the reporting agency. In most cases the city and the reporting agency are identical.

Murder is the only statistic that all agencies are required to report. Consequently, some agencies do not report all the crimes. If components are missing the total is adjusted to "0."

== Note about population ==
Data are voluntarily submitted by each jurisdiction and some jurisdictions do not appear in the table because they either did not submit data or they did not meet deadlines.

The FBI document on the UCR methodology has the following disclaimer on population estimates:

For population estimates, the FBI computed individual rates of growth from one year to the next for every city/town and county using the current decennial counts through the most recent population estimates available from the U.S. Census Bureau. Each agency’s rates of growth were averaged; that average was then applied and added to its most recent Census population estimate to derive the agency’s current year population estimate. Population totals for 2010 are from the U.S. Census Bureau’s decennial population counts.

== 2024 Calendar Year Ratios of Crime Per 100,000 Population ==
Rates are based on cases per 100,000 for all of calendar 2024.

State	City	Popul.	Yearly Crime Rates per 100,000 people										
State	City	Popul.	Total	Violent crime					Arson^{1}	Property crime			
State	City	Popul.	Total	Murder and Nonnegligent manslaughter	Rape	Robbery	Aggravated assault	Total	Arson^{1}	Burglary	Larceny theft	Motor vehicle theft	Total
Alabama	Auburn	83,756	1087.68	0.00	19.10	9.55	78.80	107.45	1.19	39.40	871.58	68.05	979.03
Alabama	Dothan	71,318	3701.73	7.01	68.71	53.28	783.81	912.81	23.84	364.56	2268.71	131.80	2765.08
Alabama	Hoover	92,352	1336.19	3.25	9.75	9.75	55.22	77.96	1.08	75.80	1114.22	67.13	1257.15
Alabama	Madison	62,087	1539.77	3.22	28.99	16.11	162.67	210.99	1.61	106.30	1124.23	96.64	1327.17
Arizona	Avondale	94,911	2619.30	5.27	46.36	38.98	279.21	369.82	8.43	197.03	1770.08	273.94	2241.05
Arizona	Casa Grande	67,317	1948.99	5.94	44.57	22.28	337.21	410.00	10.40	256.99	1023.52	248.08	1528.59
Arizona	Flagstaff	76,433	2705.64	6.54	70.65	53.64	332.32	463.15	10.47	122.98	1970.35	138.68	2232.02
Arizona	Marana	60,507	1470.90	3.31	8.26	6.61	97.51	115.69	4.96	87.59	1203.17	59.50	1350.26
Arizona	Maricopa	75,614	1093.71	2.65	6.61	5.29	210.28	224.83	0.00	62.16	748.54	58.19	868.89
Arizona	Queen Creek	82,639	949.91	0.00	12.10	3.63	104.07	119.80	8.47	56.87	730.89	33.88	821.65
Arkansas	Bentonville	61,109	1088.22	4.91	37.64	3.27	209.46	255.28	4.91	88.37	688.93	50.73	828.03
Arkansas	Conway	71,417	2575.02	2.80	50.41	35.01	435.47	523.68	4.20	176.43	1753.08	117.62	2047.13
Arkansas	Fort Smith	89,977	4537.83	0.00	90.02	65.57	686.84	842.44	11.11	466.79	2904.08	313.41	3684.27
Arkansas	Jonesboro	81,256	3772.03	6.15	103.38	61.53	548.88	719.95	7.38	929.16	1892.78	222.75	3044.70
Arkansas	North Little Rock	64,487	5509.64	29.46	40.32	181.43	928.87	1180.08	17.06	601.67	3189.79	521.04	4312.50
Arkansas	Rogers	75,307	1622.69	1.33	102.25	15.93	221.76	341.27	6.64	135.45	1075.60	63.74	1274.78
Arkansas	Springdale	91,630	2414.06	4.37	109.13	20.74	356.87	491.11	2.18	196.44	1572.63	151.70	1920.77
California	Alameda	74,458	5270.09	8.06	21.49	124.90	162.51	316.96	38.95	257.86	3377.74	1278.57	4914.18
California	Alhambra	78,840	2681.38	1.27	13.95	95.13	114.16	224.51	6.34	332.32	1844.24	273.97	2450.53
California	Apple Valley	74,764	2137.39	6.69	33.44	68.21	407.95	516.29	18.73	268.85	945.64	387.89	1602.38
California	Baldwin Park	67,791	1835.05	8.85	23.60	79.66	292.07	404.18	1.48	190.29	930.80	308.30	1429.39
California	Beaumont	60,294	1230.64	0.00	18.24	36.49	149.27	204.00	8.29	127.71	792.78	97.85	1018.34
California	Bellflower	73,883	2799.02	6.77	27.07	159.71	419.58	613.13	16.24	346.49	1000.23	822.92	2169.65
California	Brentwood	65,352	2639.55	0.00	30.60	90.28	120.88	241.77	7.65	220.35	1912.72	257.07	2390.13
California	Buena Park	81,334	2632.36	0.00	29.51	92.21	127.87	249.59	19.67	217.62	1726.22	419.26	2363.10
California	Camarillo	69,115	1319.54	1.45	23.15	15.92	88.26	128.77	0.00	109.96	976.63	104.17	1190.77
California	Carson	89,767	3368.72	10.03	26.74	116.97	266.24	419.98	17.82	431.12	1692.16	807.65	2930.92
California	Chino	93,818	2521.90	3.20	36.24	56.49	203.59	299.52	10.66	219.57	1660.66	331.49	2211.73
California	Chino Hills	76,802	1115.86	0.00	19.53	26.04	92.45	138.02	2.60	204.42	684.88	85.94	975.24
California	Citrus Heights	85,809	2608.12	3.50	38.46	95.56	301.83	439.35	41.95	369.43	1474.20	283.19	2126.82
California	Compton	89,564	4495.11	20.10	37.96	350.59	863.07	1271.72	78.16	387.43	1611.14	1146.67	3145.24
California	Daly City	98,217	2116.74	1.02	30.54	95.71	169.01	296.28	12.22	95.71	1386.73	325.81	1808.24
California	Davis	65,483	2437.27	1.53	29.02	32.07	123.70	186.31	39.70	142.02	1924.16	145.08	2211.26
California	Dublin	68,099	2080.79	1.47	5.87	51.40	95.45	154.19	8.81	157.12	1560.96	199.71	1917.80
California	Eastvale	70,669	1824.00	0.00	7.08	38.21	48.11	93.39	1.42	148.58	1379.67	200.94	1729.19
California	Encinitas	60,461	1166.04	1.65	6.62	36.39	170.36	215.01	9.92	162.09	656.62	122.39	941.10
California	Folsom	86,152	1645.93	4.64	29.02	29.02	120.72	183.40	10.45	117.23	1259.40	75.45	1452.08
California	Hanford	60,208	1667.55	4.98	38.20	53.15	386.99	483.32	31.56	162.77	764.02	225.88	1152.67
California	Hawthorne	81,941	3209.63	9.76	37.83	223.33	456.43	727.35	17.09	291.67	1385.14	788.37	2465.19
California	Hemet	93,212	2067.33	4.29	35.40	98.70	286.44	424.84	8.58	169.51	1217.65	246.75	1633.91
California	Laguna Niguel	62,363	1035.87	0.00	11.22	27.26	88.19	126.68	4.81	150.73	654.23	99.42	904.38
California	La Habra	60,335	2532.53	0.00	48.06	81.21	233.70	362.97	9.94	193.92	1725.37	240.32	2159.61
California	Lake Elsinore	73,871	2030.57	2.71	12.18	66.33	92.05	173.28	4.06	197.64	1444.41	211.18	1853.23
California	Lake Forest	85,811	983.56	0.00	3.50	32.63	109.54	145.67	8.16	107.21	567.53	154.99	829.73
California	Lakewood	76,818	3042.26	3.91	15.62	182.25	251.24	453.02	3.91	295.50	1675.39	614.44	2585.33
California	La Mesa	60,352	1806.07	6.63	13.26	82.85	313.16	415.89	11.60	220.37	896.41	261.80	1378.58
California	Livermore	81,316	2582.52	3.69	33.20	49.19	148.80	234.89	22.14	290.23	1650.35	384.92	2325.50
California	Lynwood	62,089	4155.33	8.05	32.21	344.67	525.05	909.98	37.04	373.66	1460.81	1373.83	3208.30
California	Madera	68,607	1647.06	2.92	48.10	74.34	268.19	393.55	75.79	102.03	800.21	275.48	1177.72
California	Manteca	93,538	1832.41	1.07	42.76	72.70	230.92	347.45	16.04	196.71	1034.87	237.34	1468.92
California	Merced	96,077	3653.32	7.29	103.04	166.53	507.93	784.79	75.98	569.34	1738.19	485.03	2792.55
California	Milpitas	76,523	3508.75	3.92	43.12	83.63	182.95	313.63	11.76	246.98	2539.11	397.27	3183.36
California	Mission Viejo	89,699	1289.87	0.00	4.46	32.33	62.43	99.22	4.46	108.14	977.71	100.34	1186.19
California	Mountain View	81,461	3103.33	0.00	46.65	55.24	205.01	306.90	23.32	494.72	2046.38	232.01	2773.11
California	Napa	76,888	1705.08	5.20	24.71	45.52	213.30	288.73	33.82	85.84	1145.82	150.87	1382.53
California	Newport Beach	81,811	2125.63	2.44	33.00	46.45	169.90	251.80	1.22	315.36	1409.35	147.90	1872.61
California	Norwalk	96,677	2341.82	2.07	11.38	146.88	214.12	374.44	9.31	237.91	1147.12	573.04	1958.07
California	Palo Alto	65,079	3256.04	1.54	38.41	53.78	118.32	212.05	10.76	225.88	2622.97	184.39	3033.24
California	Perris	81,203	2172.33	3.69	32.02	89.90	201.96	327.57	9.85	171.18	1378.03	285.70	1834.91
California	Pittsburg	75,621	2618.32	2.64	37.03	112.40	308.12	460.19	9.26	321.34	1024.85	802.69	2148.87
California	Pleasanton	73,054	1795.93	1.37	8.21	47.91	57.49	114.98	4.11	209.43	1238.81	228.60	1676.84
California	Porterville	62,891	1876.26	0.00	31.80	69.96	283.03	384.79	9.54	289.39	841.14	351.40	1481.93
California	Rancho Cordova	83,622	2551.96	4.78	39.46	80.12	301.36	425.73	14.35	325.27	1462.53	324.08	2111.88
California	Redding	92,468	2398.67	6.49	93.01	102.74	445.56	647.79	5.41	200.07	1295.58	249.82	1745.47
California	Redlands	72,331	2469.20	4.15	48.39	73.27	172.82	298.63	19.36	270.98	1540.14	340.10	2151.22
California	Redondo Beach	66,593	2844.14	1.50	24.03	96.11	127.64	249.28	9.01	414.46	1886.08	285.32	2585.86
California	Redwood City	80,060	2119.66	2.50	53.71	137.40	278.54	472.15	27.48	118.66	1246.57	254.81	1620.03
California	Rocklin	74,048	1087.13	1.35	33.76	17.56	112.09	164.76	18.91	71.58	773.82	58.07	903.47
California	San Clemente	61,692	1466.96	1.62	6.48	42.14	132.92	183.17	16.21	136.16	925.57	205.86	1267.59
California	San Leandro	84,200	4484.56	4.75	19.00	280.29	244.66	548.69	13.06	574.82	2134.20	1213.78	3922.80
California	San Marcos	93,974	889.61	1.06	6.38	31.92	183.03	222.40	7.45	151.11	400.11	108.54	659.76
California	San Mateo	99,929	2130.51	5.00	26.02	74.05	138.10	243.17	4.00	98.07	1578.12	207.15	1883.34
California	San Ramon	84,452	1204.23	0.00	14.21	22.50	49.73	86.44	4.74	134.99	828.87	149.20	1113.06
California	Santa Barbara	85,758	2469.74	0.00	82.79	74.63	490.92	648.34	11.66	170.25	1441.26	198.23	1809.74
California	Santa Cruz	61,346	3203.14	4.89	42.38	102.70	462.95	612.92	74.98	135.30	2221.82	158.12	2515.24
California	Santa Monica	88,948	5630.26	4.50	71.95	202.37	499.17	777.98	61.83	848.81	3382.88	558.75	4790.44
California	South Gate	89,223	4145.79	4.48	29.14	240.97	251.06	525.65	21.29	288.04	2335.72	975.08	3598.85
California	South San Francisco	62,229	1875.33	0.00	22.50	35.35	242.65	300.50	16.07	102.85	1107.20	348.71	1558.76
California	Tracy	99,519	1901.14	4.02	37.18	84.41	175.85	301.45	8.04	153.74	1171.64	266.28	1591.66
California	Tulare	71,689	2441.10	11.16	64.17	89.27	407.31	571.91	26.50	331.99	1191.26	319.44	1842.68
California	Turlock	71,886	2367.64	4.17	48.69	133.54	289.35	475.75	15.30	196.14	1368.83	311.60	1876.58
California	Tustin	76,985	2327.73	0.00	11.69	89.63	110.41	211.73	11.69	214.33	1710.72	179.26	2104.31
California	Union City	63,976	2668.19	3.13	17.19	120.36	267.29	407.97	25.01	292.30	1269.23	673.69	2235.21
California	Upland	78,584	2186.20	2.55	34.36	110.71	222.69	370.30	22.91	347.40	1184.72	260.87	1792.99
California	Vista	98,290	1187.30	2.03	9.16	50.87	254.35	316.41	7.12	124.12	552.45	187.20	863.77
California	Walnut Creek	68,808	3181.32	0.00	24.71	85.75	170.04	280.49	2.91	389.49	2257.00	251.42	2897.92
California	Westminster	88,026	2950.26	3.41	29.54	113.60	289.69	436.23	15.90	364.66	1910.80	222.66	2498.13
California	Whittier	83,186	2877.89	6.01	28.85	143.05	312.55	490.47	12.02	341.40	1606.04	427.96	2375.40
California	Woodland	61,177	1703.25	8.17	24.52	60.48	181.44	274.61	9.81	117.69	1051.05	250.09	1418.83
California	Yorba Linda	65,469	861.48	0.00	4.58	18.33	70.26	93.17	3.05	106.92	574.32	84.01	765.25
California	Yuba City	68,200	2104.11	5.87	73.31	74.78	269.79	423.75	21.99	168.62	1236.07	253.67	1658.36
Colorado	Broomfield	78,294	2010.37	1.28	31.93	20.44	94.52	148.16	6.39	204.36	1411.35	240.12	1855.83
Colorado	Castle Rock	84,098	976.24	0.00	8.32	5.95	21.40	35.67	2.38	61.83	833.55	42.81	938.19
Colorado	Commerce City	70,170	3702.44	8.55	102.61	112.58	567.19	790.94	39.90	316.37	1715.83	839.39	2871.60
Colorado	Grand Junction	70,686	3773.02	4.24	83.47	48.10	410.27	546.08	56.59	321.14	2624.28	224.94	3170.36
Colorado	Longmont	98,446	3112.37	4.06	119.86	31.49	313.88	469.29	24.38	222.46	2084.39	311.85	2618.69
Colorado	Loveland	80,374	2347.77	3.73	75.90	29.86	205.29	314.78	14.93	167.96	1663.47	186.63	2018.07
Colorado	Parker	64,088	1867.74	3.12	39.01	10.92	156.04	209.09	10.92	185.68	1324.74	137.31	1647.73
Connecticut	Bristol	61,895	1017.85	3.23	8.08	25.85	21.00	58.16	1.62	85.63	563.86	308.59	958.07
Connecticut	Danbury	86,257	1522.20	0.00	30.14	32.46	199.40	262.01	3.48	202.88	925.14	128.69	1256.71
Connecticut	Fairfield	64,098	1435.30	0.00	1.56	7.80	14.04	23.40	1.56	56.16	1223.13	131.05	1410.34
Connecticut	Greenwich	63,651	876.66	0.00	4.71	4.71	0.00	9.43	0.00	91.12	642.57	133.54	867.23
Connecticut	New Britain	74,528	2368.24	4.03	45.62	65.75	305.93	421.32	21.47	130.15	1308.23	487.07	1925.45
Connecticut	Norwalk	92,987	1589.47	0.00	16.13	16.13	52.70	84.96	0.00	244.12	1098.00	162.39	1504.51
Connecticut	West Hartford	64,093	2795.94	0.00	4.68	43.69	15.60	63.97	0.00	243.40	2248.30	240.28	2731.97
Delaware	Wilmington	71,958	4288.61	34.74	6.95	254.32	831.04	1127.05	2.78	486.39	2001.17	671.22	3158.79
Florida^{3}	Apopka	60,583	2754.90	1.65	44.57	61.07	323.52	430.81	6.60	475.38	1597.81	244.29	2317.48
Florida^{3}	Boynton Beach	81,473	2705.19	3.68	36.82	77.33	299.49	417.32	4.91	203.75	1982.25	96.96	2282.96
Florida^{3}	Delray Beach	67,780	3056.95	2.95	39.83	54.59	324.58	421.95	4.43	172.62	2273.53	184.42	2630.57
Florida^{3}	Kissimmee	81,967	2391.21	2.44	63.44	69.54	356.24	491.66	4.88	262.30	1571.36	61.00	1894.66
Florida^{3}	North Port	93,930	875.12	0.00	24.49	4.26	64.94	93.69	0.00	51.10	713.30	17.03	781.43
Florida^{3}	Ocala	70,046	3553.38	7.14	48.54	58.53	385.46	499.67	4.28	274.11	2742.48	32.84	3049.42
Florida^{3}	Plantation	98,100	2485.22	7.14	12.23	48.93	141.69	209.99	2.04	94.80	1887.87	290.52	2273.19
Florida^{3}	Sanford	66,900	2798.21	5.98	40.36	92.68	403.59	542.60	2.99	261.58	1790.73	200.30	2252.62
Florida^{3}	St. Cloud	68,966	948.29	2.90	18.85	10.15	156.60	188.50	1.45	131.95	604.65	21.75	758.34
Florida^{3}	Wellington	61,652	927.79	3.24	25.95	11.35	89.21	129.76	3.24	56.77	637.45	100.56	794.78
Georgia	Albany	66,169	2442.23	25.69	58.94	52.89	686.12	823.65	10.58	205.53	1236.23	166.24	1608.00
Georgia	Alpharetta	67,788	1402.90	1.48	22.13	11.80	213.90	249.31	1.48	75.23	1019.35	57.53	1152.12
Georgia	Johns Creek	81,056	572.44	0.00	2.47	8.64	24.67	35.78	0.00	48.11	457.71	30.84	536.67
Georgia	Marietta	63,354	2113.52	9.47	26.83	39.46	222.56	298.32	4.74	181.52	1415.85	213.09	1810.46
Georgia	Roswell	91,789	1190.77	2.18	19.61	25.06	113.30	160.15	9.81	103.50	854.13	63.19	1020.82
Georgia	Warner Robins	85,900	3660.07	8.15	32.60	75.67	549.48	665.89	13.97	359.72	2378.35	242.14	2980.21
Idaho	Caldwell	71,115	1435.70	1.41	85.78	5.62	359.98	452.79	5.62	147.65	736.83	92.81	977.29
Idaho	Idaho Falls	68,716	1571.69	4.37	71.31	10.19	270.68	356.54	5.82	308.52	774.20	126.61	1209.33
Illinois	Arlington Heights	73,545	945.00	0.00	13.60	10.88	25.83	50.31	14.96	160.45	643.14	76.14	879.73
Illinois	Bolingbrook	74,177	969.30	1.35	44.49	17.53	118.64	182.00	8.09	241.31	436.79	101.11	779.22
Illinois	Champaign	89,466	2788.77	5.59	68.18	91.65	336.44	501.87	7.82	574.52	1472.07	232.49	2279.08
Illinois	Cicero	79,748	1592.52	5.02	15.05	121.63	205.65	347.34	11.29	420.07	431.36	382.45	1233.89
Illinois	Decatur	67,934	3518.12	7.36	45.63	94.21	454.85	602.05	48.58	927.37	1532.37	407.75	2867.49
Illinois	Evanston	74,178	2891.69	0.00	31.01	55.27	55.27	141.55	8.09	451.62	2054.52	235.92	2742.05
Illinois	Palatine	63,960	1011.57	1.56	17.20	9.38	39.09	67.23	3.13	211.07	666.04	64.10	941.21
Illinois	Schaumburg	74,882	2490.59	0.00	28.04	22.70	40.06	90.81	1.34	173.61	2107.32	117.52	2398.44
Illinois	Skokie	64,047	2896.31	0.00	29.67	64.02	110.86	204.54	6.25	715.10	1675.33	295.10	2685.53
Illinois	Waukegan	87,155	2072.17	5.74	88.35	60.81	290.29	445.18	12.62	270.78	819.23	524.35	1614.37
Indiana	Bloomington	78,762	3024.30	3.81	60.94	55.86	166.32	286.94	19.04	226.00	2325.99	166.32	2718.32
Indiana	Greenwood	67,086	1639.69	1.49	5.96	19.38	81.98	108.82	1.49	65.59	1320.69	143.10	1529.38
Indiana	Hammond	75,677	3822.83	14.54	42.28	91.18	593.31	741.31	9.25	231.25	2461.78	379.24	3072.27
Indiana	Lafayette	71,374	2650.83	7.01	123.29	44.83	424.52	599.66	8.41	152.72	1642.05	247.99	2042.76
Indiana	Muncie	65,072	2862.98	4.61	86.06	35.35	476.40	602.41	3.07	433.37	1441.48	382.65	2257.50
Indiana	Noblesville	75,216	622.21	0.00	22.60	2.66	58.50	83.76	0.00	29.25	441.40	67.80	538.45
Indiana	Westfield	61,845	685.58	0.00	9.70	4.85	27.49	42.04	0.00	54.98	556.23	32.34	643.54
Iowa	Ames	65,426	1656.83	0.00	70.31	7.64	70.31	148.26	3.06	172.71	1244.15	88.65	1505.52
Iowa	Ankeny	76,547	1187.51	0.00	40.50	6.53	118.88	165.91	0.00	64.01	872.67	84.92	1021.59
Iowa	Council Bluffs	62,269	2885.87	3.21	72.27	70.66	274.61	420.76	12.85	486.60	1634.84	330.82	2452.26
Iowa	Davenport	99,926	4141.06	8.01	108.08	65.05	400.30	581.43	19.01	653.48	2555.89	331.25	3540.62
Iowa	Iowa City	75,934	2000.42	0.00	53.99	50.04	217.29	321.33	5.27	156.72	1389.36	127.74	1673.82
Iowa	Sioux City	85,711	3902.65	3.50	84.00	95.67	372.18	555.35	23.33	474.85	2555.10	294.01	3323.96
Iowa	Waterloo	66,385	2946.45	4.52	39.17	34.65	397.68	476.01	25.61	585.98	1658.51	200.35	2444.83
Iowa	West Des Moines	73,335	1881.78	0.00	21.82	12.27	130.91	165.00	2.73	114.54	1471.33	128.18	1714.05
Kansas	Lawrence	96,636	2629.45	5.17	74.51	33.11	348.73	461.53	11.38	229.73	1762.28	164.53	2156.55
Kansas	Shawnee	70,089	2050.25	0.00	15.69	5.71	255.39	276.79	1.43	219.72	1352.57	199.75	1772.03
Kentucky	Bowling Green	77,503	3162.46	1.29	89.03	46.45	87.74	224.51	9.03	340.63	2322.49	265.80	2928.92
Kentucky	Owensboro	60,096	3284.74	1.66	78.21	44.93	224.64	349.44	18.30	337.79	2258.05	321.15	2917.00
Louisiana	Bossier City	62,750	4605.58	11.16	76.49	58.96	766.53	913.15	12.75	481.27	2807.97	390.44	3679.68
Louisiana	Kenner	62,377	3182.26	9.62	33.67	30.46	270.93	344.68	4.81	309.41	2244.42	278.95	2832.77
Louisiana	Lake Charles	77,982	3082.76	16.67	52.58	64.12	479.60	612.96	0.00	612.96	1651.66	205.18	2469.80
Maine	Portland	69,310	2761.51	7.21	41.84	50.50	167.36	266.92	15.87	145.72	2177.18	155.82	2478.72
Maryland	Frederick	88,428	2084.18	2.26	55.41	52.02	296.29	405.98	4.52	244.27	1317.46	111.96	1673.68
Maryland	Gaithersburg	69,590	1564.88	1.44	28.74	64.66	158.07	252.91	0.00	150.88	1023.14	137.95	1311.97
Maryland	Rockville	67,285	1674.96	0.00	16.35	44.59	89.17	150.11	1.49	191.72	1144.39	187.26	1523.37
Massachusetts	Brookline	64,122	996.54	0.00	4.68	15.60	79.54	99.81	1.56	85.77	784.44	24.95	895.17
Massachusetts	Fall River	95,573	2150.19	3.14	60.69	100.45	578.62	742.89	15.69	231.24	996.10	164.27	1391.61
Massachusetts	Framingham	73,123	1382.60	0.00	9.57	27.35	288.55	325.48	2.74	374.71	568.90	110.77	1054.39
Massachusetts	Haverhill	68,602	1343.98	0.00	10.20	13.12	387.74	411.07	8.75	116.61	762.37	45.19	924.17
Massachusetts	Lawrence	89,600	1439.73	7.81	31.25	52.46	348.21	439.73	1.12	72.54	851.56	74.78	998.88
Massachusetts	Malden	66,046	1474.73	0.00	15.14	39.37	237.71	292.22	3.03	121.13	888.77	169.58	1179.48
Massachusetts	Newton	89,935	648.25	0.00	10.01	1.11	37.81	48.92	0.00	63.38	501.47	34.47	599.32
Massachusetts	Plymouth	68,195	1022.07	2.93	22.00	10.26	287.41	322.60	4.40	63.05	582.15	49.86	695.07
Massachusetts	Somerville	81,766	1922.56	0.00	15.90	24.46	181.00	221.36	2.45	289.85	1279.26	129.64	1698.75
Massachusetts	Taunton	61,874	1281.64	1.62	19.39	27.48	399.20	447.68	0.00	116.37	631.93	85.66	833.95
Massachusetts	Waltham	65,488	962.01	1.53	18.32	22.90	209.20	251.95	10.69	125.21	519.18	54.97	699.36
Massachusetts	Weymouth	60,802	1042.73	0.00	21.38	19.74	182.56	223.68	0.00	93.75	638.14	87.17	819.05
Michigan	Battle Creek	61,163	3678.69	8.17	111.18	55.59	946.65	1121.59	34.33	510.11	1716.72	295.93	2522.77
Michigan	Canton Township	97,844	1226.44	3.07	23.51	5.11	141.04	172.72	2.04	59.28	907.57	84.83	1051.67
Michigan	Clinton Township	99,056	1761.63	4.04	60.57	20.19	235.22	320.02	12.11	120.13	1053.95	255.41	1429.49
Michigan	Dearborn Heights	60,148	1707.45	1.66	21.61	48.21	387.38	458.87	9.98	167.92	758.13	312.56	1238.61
Michigan	Farmington Hills	82,116	884.12	1.22	19.48	12.18	165.62	198.50	4.87	86.46	482.24	112.04	680.74
Michigan	Flint	79,183	2590.20	25.26	59.36	60.62	1112.61	1257.85	20.21	277.84	732.48	301.83	1312.15
Michigan	Kalamazoo	73,002	4784.80	13.70	147.94	165.75	956.14	1283.53	53.42	620.53	2313.64	513.68	3447.85
Michigan	Livonia	91,189	1496.89	0.00	21.93	15.35	190.81	228.10	6.58	82.25	1011.09	168.88	1262.21
Michigan	Novi	66,366	754.90	1.51	12.05	4.52	81.37	99.45	0.00	42.19	534.91	78.35	655.46
Michigan	Pontiac	61,644	2636.10	21.09	47.04	63.27	853.29	984.69	9.73	321.20	996.04	324.44	1641.68
Michigan	Rochester Hills	75,960	625.33	1.32	6.58	0.00	84.25	92.15	1.32	51.34	421.27	59.24	531.86
Michigan	Shelby Township	79,985	703.88	0.00	35.01	6.25	118.77	160.03	1.25	45.01	411.33	86.27	542.60
Michigan	Southfield	75,454	2924.96	1.33	59.64	39.76	392.29	493.02	11.93	405.55	1467.12	547.35	2420.02
Michigan	Taylor	60,602	2864.59	4.95	49.50	75.91	707.90	838.26	9.90	297.02	1371.24	348.17	2016.44
Michigan	Troy	87,422	1394.39	0.00	25.17	18.30	72.06	115.53	2.29	82.36	1084.40	109.81	1276.57
Michigan	Waterford Township	69,066	1111.98	1.45	31.85	8.69	237.45	279.44	2.90	183.88	496.63	149.13	829.64
Michigan	West Bloomfield Township	64,892	608.70	0.00	7.71	9.25	64.72	81.67	1.54	38.53	445.36	41.61	525.49
Michigan	Westland	81,727	1818.25	3.67	55.06	36.71	353.62	449.06	13.46	197.00	927.48	231.26	1355.73
Michigan	Wyoming	77,684	2623.45	3.86	78.52	47.63	341.13	471.14	7.72	274.19	1643.84	226.56	2144.59
Minnesota	Blaine	74,913	1505.75	2.67	16.02	13.35	57.40	89.44	5.34	129.48	1212.07	69.41	1410.97
Minnesota	Bloomington	86,598	3791.08	1.15	55.43	41.57	213.63	311.79	15.01	219.40	3022.01	222.87	3464.28
Minnesota	Brooklyn Park	80,665	2780.64	4.96	47.11	75.62	163.64	291.33	11.16	261.58	1833.51	383.07	2478.15
Minnesota	Burnsville	64,860	2101.45	7.71	44.71	16.96	140.30	209.68	3.08	101.76	1662.04	124.88	1888.68
Minnesota	Coon Rapids	63,308	1862.32	6.32	45.81	26.85	132.68	211.66	11.06	189.55	1307.89	142.16	1639.60
Minnesota	Duluth	88,003	3198.75	7.95	46.59	37.50	127.27	219.31	25.00	274.99	2555.59	123.86	2954.44
Minnesota	Eagan	66,956	1872.87	0.00	25.39	5.97	71.69	103.05	0.00	155.33	1538.32	76.17	1769.82
Minnesota	Eden Prairie	61,511	1355.86	1.63	29.26	8.13	34.14	73.16	3.25	69.91	1165.65	43.89	1279.45
Minnesota	Lakeville	78,436	648.94	2.55	29.32	1.27	43.35	76.50	1.27	53.55	481.92	35.70	571.17
Minnesota	Maple Grove	71,622	1882.10	0.00	23.74	16.75	72.60	113.09	5.58	143.81	1583.31	36.30	1763.42
Minnesota	Plymouth	76,577	1077.35	0.00	3.92	13.06	33.95	50.93	2.61	134.51	830.54	58.76	1023.81
Minnesota	St. Cloud	71,492	3344.43	0.00	85.32	50.36	272.76	408.44	20.98	248.98	2500.98	165.05	2915.01
Minnesota	Woodbury	80,940	1281.20	1.24	18.53	9.88	69.19	98.84	2.47	130.96	1027.92	21.00	1179.89
Missouri	Blue Springs	61,096	2685.94	4.91	49.10	21.28	160.40	235.69	1.64	171.86	1960.85	315.90	2448.61
Missouri	O'Fallon	94,911	543.67	0.00	17.91	1.05	40.04	59.00	5.27	30.55	413.02	35.82	479.40
Missouri	St. Charles	72,143	1024.35	4.16	18.02	18.02	94.26	134.46	2.77	54.06	702.77	130.30	887.13
Missouri	St. Joseph	70,139	4596.59	4.28	178.22	54.18	491.88	728.55	17.11	536.08	2774.49	540.36	3850.92
Montana	Great Falls	60,414	4025.56	0.00	89.38	46.35	438.64	574.37	24.83	397.26	2810.61	218.49	3426.36
Montana	Missoula	78,911	4252.89	2.53	106.45	45.62	442.27	596.87	26.61	323.15	3108.57	197.69	3629.41
Nebraska	Bellevue	63,510	1239.17	0.00	72.43	11.02	15.75	99.20	7.87	97.62	910.09	124.39	1132.11
New Hampshire	Nashua	90,938	1428.45	0.00	53.88	14.30	92.37	160.55	6.60	32.99	1141.44	86.87	1261.30
New Jersey	Brick Township	78,685	1213.70	0.00	20.33	7.63	109.30	137.26	3.81	118.19	935.38	19.06	1072.63
New Jersey	Camden County Police Department	72,435	4472.98	26.23	78.69	252.64	1022.99	1380.55	52.46	411.40	1623.52	1005.04	3039.97
New Jersey	Cherry Hill Township	79,950	3575.98	1.25	13.76	67.54	91.31	173.86	0.00	140.09	3075.67	186.37	3402.13
New Jersey	Clifton	89,870	2433.52	1.11	10.01	44.51	110.16	165.80	2.23	306.00	1728.05	231.45	2265.49
New Jersey	East Orange	71,138	2445.95	7.03	36.55	115.27	327.53	486.38	7.03	106.83	1237.03	608.68	1952.54
New Jersey	Franklin Township, Somerset County	69,921	1209.94	1.43	12.87	18.59	45.77	78.66	0.00	110.12	919.61	101.54	1131.28
New Jersey	Gloucester Township	67,786	1215.59	2.95	2.95	1.48	60.48	67.86	1.48	66.39	957.42	122.44	1146.25
New Jersey	Hamilton Township, Mercer County	93,487	2536.18	1.07	21.39	40.65	120.87	183.98	4.28	166.87	1988.51	192.54	2347.92
New Jersey	Irvington	60,900	3024.63	8.21	42.69	244.66	147.78	443.35	0.00	121.51	1400.66	1059.11	2581.28
New Jersey	Jackson Township	62,326	473.32	1.60	8.02	1.60	28.88	40.11	4.81	43.32	352.98	32.09	428.39
New Jersey	Middletown Township	66,307	699.78	1.51	6.03	7.54	45.24	60.33	0.00	69.37	547.45	22.62	639.45
New Jersey	Old Bridge Township	70,143	768.43	0.00	0.00	5.70	62.73	68.43	0.00	41.34	593.07	65.58	700.00
New Jersey	Passaic	69,938	2559.41	1.43	17.16	158.71	541.91	719.21	2.86	163.00	1412.68	261.66	1837.34
New Jersey	Piscataway Township	62,342	808.44	0.00	0.00	16.04	91.43	107.47	1.60	73.79	540.57	85.01	699.37
New Jersey	Trenton	91,236	3334.21	21.92	58.09	366.08	579.81	1025.91	19.73	347.45	1448.99	492.13	2288.57
New Jersey	Union Township	62,290	1727.40	6.42	1.61	27.29	54.58	89.90	3.21	93.11	1391.88	149.30	1634.29
New Jersey	Vineland	60,848	3135.68	3.29	26.30	92.03	315.54	437.15	13.15	348.41	2258.09	78.89	2685.38
New Mexico	Santa Fe	89,652	6028.87	4.46	64.69	89.23	683.75	842.15	30.12	973.77	3380.85	801.99	5156.61
New York	Cheektowaga Town	78,864	3428.69	2.54	15.22	45.65	142.02	205.42	3.80	253.60	2568.98	396.89	3219.47
New York	Clarkstown Town	80,087	1931.65	0.00	6.24	16.23	72.42	94.90	8.74	58.69	1730.62	38.71	1828.01
New York	Colonie Town	81,226	3565.36	0.00	3.69	24.62	84.95	113.26	7.39	231.45	3134.46	78.79	3444.71
New York	Greece Town	93,943	2042.73	0.00	8.52	35.13	97.93	141.58	7.45	178.83	1291.21	423.66	1893.70
New York	Mount Vernon	70,390	2010.23	2.84	25.57	106.55	409.15	544.11	7.10	137.80	1047.02	274.19	1459.01
New York	New Rochelle	84,960	1242.94	0.00	2.35	42.37	89.45	134.18	3.53	25.89	1022.83	56.50	1105.23
New York	Schenectady	68,610	3802.65	10.20	56.84	100.57	478.06	645.68	27.69	400.82	2508.38	220.08	3129.28
New York	Utica	63,098	3492.98	7.92	38.04	95.09	386.70	527.75	15.85	294.78	2508.80	145.80	2949.38
New York	White Plains	61,923	1874.91	1.61	4.84	17.76	87.21	111.43	3.23	90.43	1622.98	46.83	1760.25
North Carolina	Asheville	95,219	4722.80	12.60	86.12	113.42	583.92	796.06	31.51	601.77	2956.34	337.12	3895.23
North Carolina	Burlington	60,906	4080.06	6.57	78.81	114.93	751.98	952.29	42.69	517.19	2208.32	359.57	3085.08
North Carolina	Chapel Hill	63,906	2693.02	1.56	12.52	45.38	112.67	172.13	6.26	339.56	1988.86	186.21	2514.63
North Carolina	Gastonia	85,112	4389.51	4.70	37.60	123.37	683.80	849.47	25.85	512.27	2587.18	414.75	3514.19
North Carolina	Greenville	90,871	3381.72	9.90	18.71	53.92	370.86	453.39	14.31	271.81	2450.73	191.48	2914.02
North Carolina	Huntersville	65,752	1513.26	1.52	18.25	19.77	103.42	142.96	6.08	252.46	953.58	158.17	1364.22
North Carolina	Kannapolis	60,725	1958.01	9.88	32.94	23.05	102.10	167.97	4.94	200.91	1366.82	217.37	1785.10
North Dakota	Bismarck	75,546	2684.46	1.32	45.01	60.89	170.76	277.98	6.62	247.53	1922.01	230.32	2399.86
Ohio	Canton	68,725	4583.48	2.91	132.41	114.95	871.59	1121.86	7.28	777.01	2459.08	218.26	3454.35
Ohio	Hamilton	62,860	2391.03	3.18	54.09	42.95	213.17	313.39	20.68	334.08	1530.38	192.49	2056.95
Ohio	Lorain	65,374	2146.11	3.06	30.59	53.54	494.08	581.27	13.77	258.51	1151.83	140.73	1551.08
Ohio	Parma	78,967	834.53	0.00	29.13	10.13	79.78	119.04	5.07	68.38	548.33	93.71	710.42
Ohio	West Chester Township	63,335	1728.90	1.58	22.10	0.00	72.63	96.31	0.00	129.47	1356.28	146.84	1632.59
Oklahoma	Edmond	99,249	1524.45	2.02	37.28	10.08	115.87	165.24	3.02	209.57	1095.23	51.39	1356.18
Oklahoma	Lawton	90,209	3515.17	9.98	143.00	72.05	595.28	820.32	42.12	931.17	1490.98	230.58	2652.73
Oklahoma	Moore	63,609	1708.88	1.57	37.73	14.15	136.77	190.22	6.29	221.67	1124.05	166.64	1512.36
Oregon	Beaverton	96,762	3046.65	1.03	66.14	64.07	233.56	364.81	20.67	351.38	2083.46	226.33	2661.17
Oregon	Corvallis	61,474	2752.38	1.63	37.41	32.53	112.24	183.82	56.93	294.43	2122.85	94.35	2511.63
Oregon	Medford	84,766	4361.42	3.54	63.70	89.66	335.04	491.94	37.75	290.21	3338.60	202.91	3831.72
Oregon	Springfield	60,830	3130.03	1.64	49.32	27.95	226.86	305.77	32.88	272.89	2322.87	195.63	2791.39
Pennsylvania	Bensalem Township	62,843	2985.22	1.59	4.77	42.96	44.56	93.88	14.32	89.11	2491.92	295.98	2877.01
Pennsylvania	Bethlehem	79,194	1583.45	2.53	40.41	27.78	135.11	205.82	8.84	84.60	1150.34	133.85	1368.79
Pennsylvania	Erie	92,379	2326.29	5.41	41.13	67.11	261.96	375.63	21.65	194.85	1645.40	88.76	1929.01
Pennsylvania	Lower Merion Township	64,290	1869.65	3.11	1.56	20.22	46.66	71.55	0.00	73.11	1549.23	175.77	1798.10
Pennsylvania	Manheim Township	63,061	769.10	0.00	4.76	9.51	60.26	74.53	3.17	36.47	639.06	15.86	691.39
Pennsylvania	Reading	97,868	1784.04	7.15	34.74	100.13	195.16	337.19	12.26	232.97	973.76	227.86	1434.59
Pennsylvania	Scranton	75,683	1643.70	9.25	92.49	31.71	147.99	281.44	17.18	192.91	1022.69	129.49	1345.08
Pennsylvania	Upper Darby Township	84,668	3047.20	4.72	7.09	133.46	68.50	213.78	1.18	64.96	2429.49	337.79	2832.24
Rhode Island	Cranston	83,815	1158.50	1.19	20.28	15.51	56.08	93.06	13.12	82.32	875.74	94.26	1052.32
Rhode Island	Pawtucket	76,400	1825.92	3.93	56.28	56.28	191.10	307.59	6.54	178.01	1091.62	242.15	1511.78
Rhode Island	Warwick	84,297	1234.92	2.37	17.79	9.49	49.82	79.48	8.30	100.83	962.07	84.23	1147.13
South Carolina	Greenville	73,405	4115.52	9.54	29.97	64.03	540.84	644.37	2.72	303.79	2858.12	306.52	3468.43
South Carolina	Mount Pleasant	96,608	1303.20	0.00	14.49	21.74	92.12	128.35	3.11	98.34	999.92	73.49	1171.75
South Carolina	Rock Hill	75,975	2794.34	11.85	34.22	39.49	355.38	440.93	5.26	275.09	1807.17	265.88	2348.14
South Dakota	Rapid City	80,957	4514.74	6.18	135.87	103.76	473.09	718.90	3.71	427.39	2986.77	377.98	3792.14
Tennessee	Franklin	90,077	1075.75	1.11	13.32	6.66	111.02	132.11	1.11	39.97	829.29	73.27	942.53
Tennessee	Hendersonville	64,126	840.53	3.12	3.12	1.56	115.40	123.19	3.12	51.46	614.42	48.34	714.22
Tennessee	Jackson	68,286	4122.37	24.90	35.15	99.58	790.79	950.41	11.72	448.12	2435.35	276.78	3160.24
Tennessee	Johnson City	74,093	2711.46	5.40	75.58	33.74	287.48	402.20	6.75	203.80	1924.61	174.11	2302.51
Texas	Baytown	83,639	3248.48	7.17	76.52	64.56	291.73	439.99	7.17	389.77	1962.00	449.55	2801.32
Texas	Bryan	91,450	1834.88	1.09	51.39	29.52	302.90	384.91	2.19	162.93	1191.91	92.95	1447.79
Texas	Cedar Park	77,351	1297.98	3.88	37.49	10.34	43.96	95.67	3.88	71.10	1029.08	98.25	1198.43
Texas	Flower Mound	80,455	640.11	0.00	13.67	3.73	39.77	57.17	0.00	43.50	498.42	41.02	582.93
Texas	Georgetown	89,481	1362.30	0.00	45.82	7.82	137.46	191.10	1.12	225.75	864.99	79.35	1170.08
Texas	Harlingen	71,388	2993.50	1.40	15.41	40.62	200.31	257.75	16.81	344.60	2066.17	308.18	2718.94
Texas	Kyle	69,069	1022.17	1.45	34.75	18.82	143.33	198.35	0.00	92.66	661.66	69.50	823.81
Texas	Leander	87,740	1062.23	0.00	53.57	1.14	14.82	69.52	4.56	147.03	769.32	71.80	988.15
Texas	Little Elm	62,837	557.00	3.18	36.60	20.69	73.21	133.68	0.00	42.97	319.88	60.47	423.32
Texas	Longview	83,771	2691.86	10.74	64.46	50.14	213.68	339.02	2.39	315.14	1828.80	206.52	2350.46
Texas	Mansfield	80,569	1474.51	2.48	17.38	9.93	63.30	93.09	0.00	110.46	1118.30	152.66	1381.42
Texas	Mission	87,777	1338.62	4.56	35.32	15.95	133.29	189.12	1.14	112.79	978.62	56.96	1148.36
Texas	Missouri City	77,571	1191.17	2.58	34.81	25.78	78.64	141.81	0.00	97.97	866.30	85.08	1049.36
Texas	North Richland Hills	70,780	2455.50	4.24	39.56	22.61	156.82	223.23	0.00	237.36	1792.88	202.03	2232.27
Texas	Pflugerville	65,243	1811.69	1.53	52.11	33.72	107.29	194.66	3.07	125.68	1310.49	177.80	1613.97
Texas	Pharr	80,604	1362.22	1.24	49.63	27.29	143.91	222.07	3.72	169.97	863.48	102.97	1136.42
Texas	Rowlett	69,135	1460.91	0.00	26.04	15.91	109.93	151.88	4.34	105.59	1077.60	121.50	1304.69
Texas	San Angelo	98,996	2709.20	4.04	24.24	20.20	169.70	218.19	5.05	387.89	1966.75	131.32	2485.96
Texas	San Marcos	72,723	2619.53	0.00	96.26	37.13	225.51	358.90	2.75	266.77	1600.59	390.52	2257.88
Texas	Temple	96,862	2694.56	11.36	73.30	37.17	195.12	316.95	15.49	364.44	1645.64	352.05	2362.12
Texas	Victoria	65,893	2287.04	4.55	56.15	37.94	264.06	362.71	4.55	294.42	1491.81	133.55	1919.78
Texas	Wylie	62,210	932.33	4.82	20.90	16.07	24.11	65.91	6.43	64.30	747.47	48.22	859.99
Utah	Herriman	61,387	720.02	1.63	32.58	1.63	81.45	117.29	4.89	76.56	459.38	61.90	597.85
Utah	Layton	84,017	1480.65	1.19	42.85	7.14	78.56	129.74	4.76	122.59	1154.53	69.03	1346.16
Utah	Lehi	95,189	633.48	3.15	38.87	4.20	42.02	88.25	4.20	50.43	437.03	53.58	541.03
Utah	Ogden	87,258	2442.18	2.29	110.02	53.86	339.22	505.40	11.46	231.50	1490.98	202.85	1925.32
Utah	Orem	94,571	1534.30	1.06	53.93	26.44	93.05	174.47	0.00	103.63	1162.09	94.11	1359.82
Utah	South Jordan	86,846	983.35	0.00	32.24	13.82	69.09	115.15	1.15	63.33	747.30	56.42	867.05
Virginia	Lynchburg	80,339	2099.85	11.20	52.28	37.34	256.41	357.24	4.98	209.11	1267.13	261.39	1737.64
Virginia	Portsmouth	97,156	4615.26	37.05	36.02	167.77	511.55	752.40	2.06	424.06	2920.05	516.69	3860.80
Virginia	Roanoke	97,027	4717.24	11.34	86.57	92.76	429.78	620.45	41.23	387.52	3273.32	394.74	4055.57
Washington	Auburn	82,838	4532.94	12.07	88.12	137.62	305.42	543.23	21.73	529.95	2180.16	1257.88	3967.99
Washington	Bellingham	95,717	4115.26	2.09	20.89	77.31	249.69	349.99	8.36	491.03	3113.34	152.53	3756.91
Washington	Federal Way	96,631	4942.51	5.17	51.74	150.06	338.40	545.37	24.84	573.31	2655.46	1143.53	4372.30
Washington	Kennewick	85,553	3831.54	3.51	51.43	84.16	227.93	367.02	3.51	354.17	2435.92	670.93	3461.01
Washington	Kirkland	90,687	2075.27	1.10	14.34	9.92	35.29	60.65	2.21	222.74	1543.77	245.90	2012.42
Washington	Lakewood	61,873	4289.43	6.46	61.42	130.91	449.31	648.10	19.39	510.72	2484.12	627.09	3621.94
Washington	Marysville	73,573	2195.10	0.00	59.80	48.93	125.05	233.78	8.16	221.55	1454.34	277.28	1953.16
Washington	Pasco	80,838	2560.68	0.00	27.21	54.43	265.96	347.61	17.32	295.65	1457.24	442.86	2195.75
Washington	Redmond	82,746	2883.52	0.00	29.00	37.46	64.05	130.52	13.29	342.01	2021.85	375.85	2739.71
Washington	Richland	64,736	2201.25	1.54	61.79	32.44	154.47	250.25	10.81	233.26	1431.97	274.96	1940.19
Washington	Sammamish	64,358	570.25	0.00	12.43	1.55	13.98	27.97	3.11	80.80	394.67	63.71	539.17
Washington	Shoreline	62,234	2754.12	1.61	38.56	89.98	81.95	212.10	9.64	486.87	1513.64	531.86	2532.38
Washington	Yakima	96,646	2604.35	15.52	37.25	58.98	432.51	544.25	15.52	354.90	1411.34	278.34	2044.58
Wisconsin	Appleton	74,394	1551.20	2.69	52.42	9.41	137.11	201.63	2.69	153.24	1130.47	63.18	1346.88
Wisconsin	Eau Claire	70,891	2072.20	2.82	56.42	9.87	93.10	162.22	4.23	252.50	1553.09	100.15	1905.74
Wisconsin	Janesville	66,247	1991.03	4.53	39.25	16.60	83.02	143.40	6.04	116.23	1651.40	73.97	1841.59
Wisconsin	Kenosha	97,652	1160.24	3.07	46.08	35.84	200.71	285.71	8.19	90.12	700.45	75.78	866.34
Wisconsin	Oshkosh	65,994	1685.00	6.06	34.85	15.15	175.77	231.84	1.52	153.04	1222.84	75.76	1451.65
Wisconsin	Racine	76,243	1500.47	5.25	78.70	61.65	237.40	382.99	5.25	200.67	722.69	188.87	1112.23
Wisconsin	Waukesha	70,202	988.58	1.42	28.49	7.12	76.92	113.96	0.00	51.28	767.78	55.55	874.62
Wyoming	Cheyenne	65,143	3321.92	3.07	90.57	27.63	207.24	328.51	4.61	392.98	2364.03	231.80	2988.81

Notes:

^{1} The FBI does not publish arson data unless it receives data from either the agency or the state for all 12 months of the calendar year.
^{2} Because of changes in this agency's reporting practices, figures are not comparable to previous years' data.
^{3} Limited data for 2024 were available for Florida.

== Criticism of ranking crime data ==
The FBI web site recommends against using its data for ranking because these rankings lead to simplistic and/or incomplete analyses that often create misleading perceptions adversely affecting cities and counties, along with their residents. The FBI web site also recommends against using its data to judge how effective law enforcement agencies are, since there are many factors that influence crime rates other than law enforcement.

In November 2007, the executive board of the American Society of Criminology (ASC) went further than the FBI itself, and approved a resolution opposing not only the use of the ratings to judge police departments, but also opposing any development of city crime rankings from FBI Uniform Crime Reports (UCRs) at all. The resolution opposed these rankings on the grounds that they "fail to account for the many conditions affecting crime rates" and "divert attention from the individual and community characteristics that elevate crime in all cities", though it did not provide sources or further elaborate on these claims. The resolution states the rankings "represent an irresponsible misuse of the data and do groundless harm to many communities" and "work against a key goal of our society, which is a better understanding of crime-related issues by both scientists and the public".

The U.S. Conference of Mayors passed a similar statement, which also committed the Conference to working with the FBI and the U.S. Department of Justice "to educate reporters, elected officials, and citizens on what the (UCR) data means and doesn't mean."

== Criticism of comparing crime rates ==
Crime rates per capita might also be biased by population size depending on the crime type. This misrepresentation occurs because rates per capita assume that crime increases at the same pace as the number of people in an area. When this linear assumption does not hold, rates per capita still have population effects. In these nonlinear cases, per capita rates can inflate or deflate the representation of crime in cities, introducing an artifactual bias into rankings. Therefore, it is necessary to test for linearity before comparing crime rates of cities of different sizes.

== Other city crime rates ==
- United States cities by crime rate, populations 250,000+
- United States cities by crime rate (100,000 - 250,000)

== See also ==
- List of U.S. states and territories by violent crime rate
- List of U.S. states and territories by intentional homicide rate
- List of cities by murder rate
- Homicide in world cities
- Crime in the United States
