= Metro Arlington Xpress =

Defunct transit service in Arlington, Texas

- Route 221

Overview
- System: Dallas Area Rapid Transit
- Status: Defunct
- Began service: August 19, 2013
- Ended service: December 29, 2017

Route
- Locale: Arlington, Texas, U.S.
- Start: CentrePort/DFW Airport Station
- Via: Downtown Arlington
- End: UT Arlington College Park Center

Service
- Operates: Weekdays only

The Metro Arlington Xpress (MAX) was a public transit system serving Arlington, Texas, a city in the Dallas–Fort Worth metroplex. MAX consisted of a single bus route that connected CentrePort/DFW Airport station on the Trinity Railway Express to downtown Arlington and the University of Texas at Arlington campus. The service was jointly-operated by Dallas Area Rapid Transit (DART) and Fort Worth Transportation Authority ("The T"), with funding provided by the city of Arlington. The pilot program started in August 2013 and was replaced by a ride-sharing service in December 2017.

== Service ==
MAX, officially DART Express Bus Route 221, ran from 5:30 a.m. to 11:30 p.m. on weekdays, at a frequency of approximately 30 minutes and 18 daily departures. The route traveled south from CentrePort/DFW Airport station on State Highway 360 to Division Street, where it turned west and stopped at Six Flags Over Texas. Buses continued on to the UT Arlington, where they terminated.

Buses were equipped with bicycle racks and free Wi-Fi for passengers. The full fare was $5, with a reduced fare of $2.50; fares included a free transfer to Trinity Railway Express trains. MAX buses were operated by Dallas Area Rapid Transit, per a 2013 agreement with the city of Arlington (which lies outside of its service area).

== History ==
From 1980 to 2002, voters in the city of Arlington rejected three proposals to establish and fund a public transit system for the city, which lies between the service areas of the Fort Worth Transportation Authority ("The T") and Dallas Area Rapid Transit (DART). The city, with a population of 375,000, became the most populous city in the United States without a public transit system.

After the defeat of a 25-cent sales tax increase to build a public transit system in 2002, plans were scaled back to a series of pilot projects. Sales taxes had already been allocated to pay debts related to the construction of Globe Life Park in Arlington, a baseball stadium for the Texas Rangers. The T began operated express service to and from downtown Fort Worth in 2008, but cancelled the project in 2011 because of low ridership.

In October 2012, the city of Arlington and UT Arlington announced plans to launch a two-year pilot bus route to serve the college campus, at an annual cost of $700,000. The pilot project was approved the following year, and began operations on August 19, 2013, as "Metro Arlington Xpress" (MAX), connecting to the CentrePort/DFW Airport rail station on the Trinity Railway Express, north of downtown Arlington. In its first year, the system recorded 64,600 one-way trips. The pilot program was funded by a federal grant and contributions from the city, UT Arlington, DART, and The T, as well as local businesses.

In its first year of service, MAX averaged 240 trips per day, short of the expected 500 trips. The trial was extended by an additional year in 2015, and an additional four-month extension in July 2016 while the city decided on a more permanent option. $708,000 in taxpayer funding, for an additional year of service through the end of 2017, was granted by the Arlington city council and the federal government in December 2016.

One of the stated goals of the pilot project was to shift voter opinion of public transit into support for a larger system funded with taxes. The pilot project's operation by DART has also been seen as the first step for the agency to expand into Arlington and Tarrant County. Despite DART's requirement that the pilot come with cities asking voters to approve entry into the DART district and sales tax, the Arlington city government stated they would not join the DART district.

In September 2017, the Arlington Transportation Advisory Committee recommended that MAX be replaced with an on-demand vanpool system. The Arlington City Council approved a partnership with Via to begin a one-year pilot of microtransit service within Arlington, costing taxpayers $922,500, to replace MAX in December 2017. MAX was officially shut down on December 29, 2017, a few weeks after Via debuted in Arlington.
