= Hurst Bell =

Hurst Bell can be used to refer to:

- L.D. Bell High School, a high school in Hurst, Texas
- Hurst/Bell, a station of the Trinity Railway Express
