= Downtown Irving/Heritage Crossing station =

Commuter rail station in Irving, Texas

Downtown Irving/Heritage Crossing
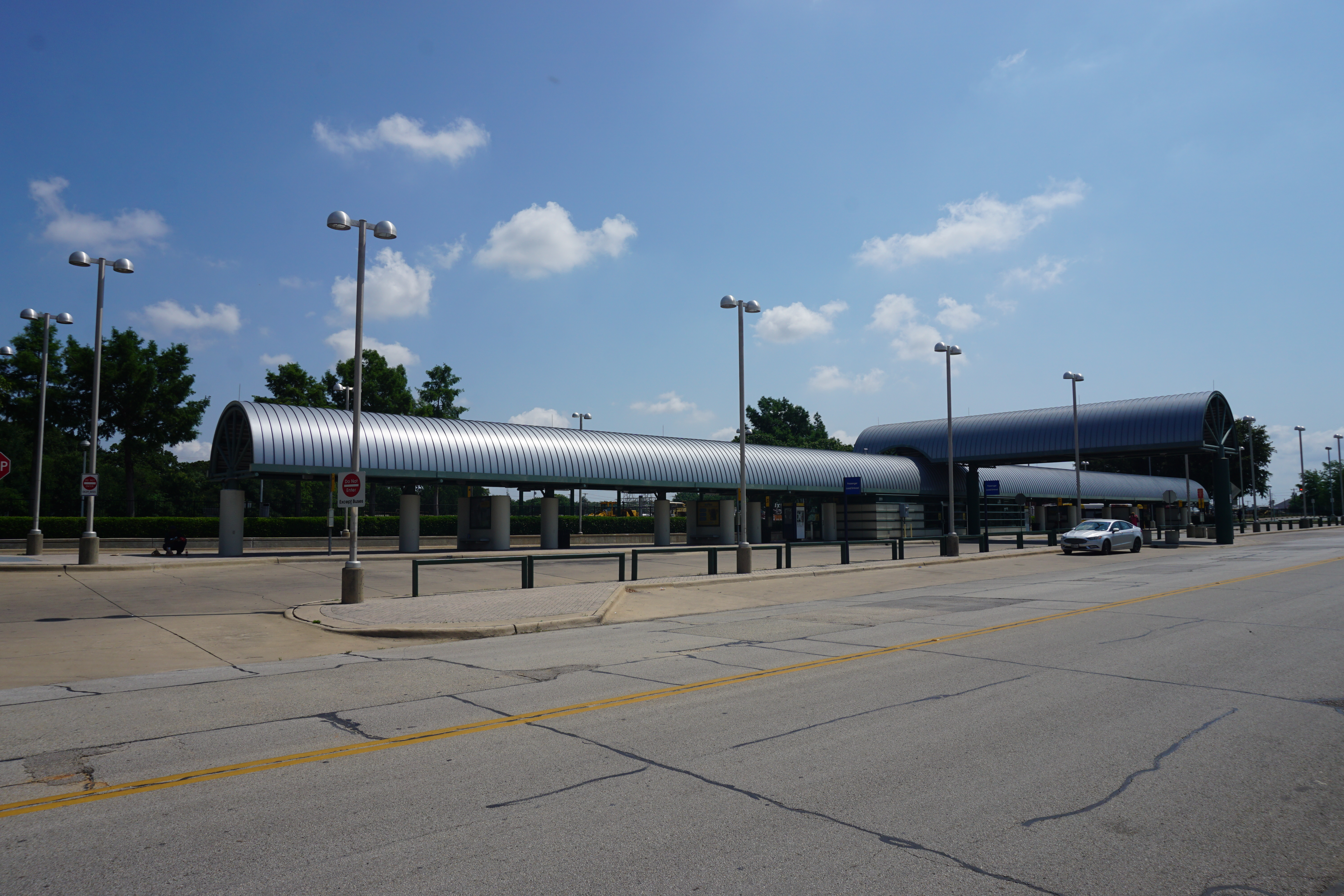
- Downtown Irving/Heritage Crossing bus platforms (2019)

General information
- Location: 201 Rock Island Road; Irving, Texas
- Coordinates: 32.8149°N 96.9478°W
- Owner: Dallas Area Rapid Transit
- Line: Trinity Railway Express
- Platforms: 1 island platform
- Tracks: 2
- Connections: DART: 25, 227, 229, 230, 231; Irving Connector: 225, 255; North Central Irving GoLink Zone (M-Sun), South Irving GoLink Zone (M-Sun)

Construction
- Structure type: At-grade
- Parking: 406 spaces
- Cycle facilities: 4 lockers, 2 racks
- Accessible: Yes

Other information
- Fare zone: East

History
- Opened: December 30, 1996 (rail)
- Former names: South Irving

Passengers
- FY 2025: 399 (avg. weekday) ▲3.1%

Services
Preceding station	Trinity Railway Express	Following station
West Irving toward T&P Station	Trinity Railway Express	Medical/Market Center toward Dallas Union Station
Former services
Preceding station	Chicago, Rock Island and Pacific Railroad	Following station
Dallas toward Teague	Teague – Minneapolis	Fort Worth toward Minneapolis
Location

Downtown Irving/Heritage Crossing station (formerly South Irving Transit Center and later South Irving station) is a Trinity Railway Express commuter rail and bus station in Irving, Texas. The station is located at the intersection of Rock Island Road and O'Connor Road in the Irving Heritage District, which includes the Irving Civic Center and the city's historic downtown.

In addition to the TRE, Downtown Irving serves five bus routes (many of which connect to the Orange Line in Irving's Las Colinas district) and two microtransit service zones. The station features an indoor waiting area.

== History ==
The city of Irving was originally constructed along a rail corridor served by the Chicago, Rock Island and Pacific Railroad. The historic Rock Island depot site was later rebuilt into South Irving Transit Center.

Trinity Railway Express service to the transit center started on December 30, 1996. South Irving was the western terminus of the TRE until West Irving station opened in 2000.

In 2012, the city of Irving requested that South Irving station be renamed to emphasize the Heritage Crossing district. The change was applied on July 30 of that year, the same date that the Orange Line was extended to northern Irving.

== Gallery ==
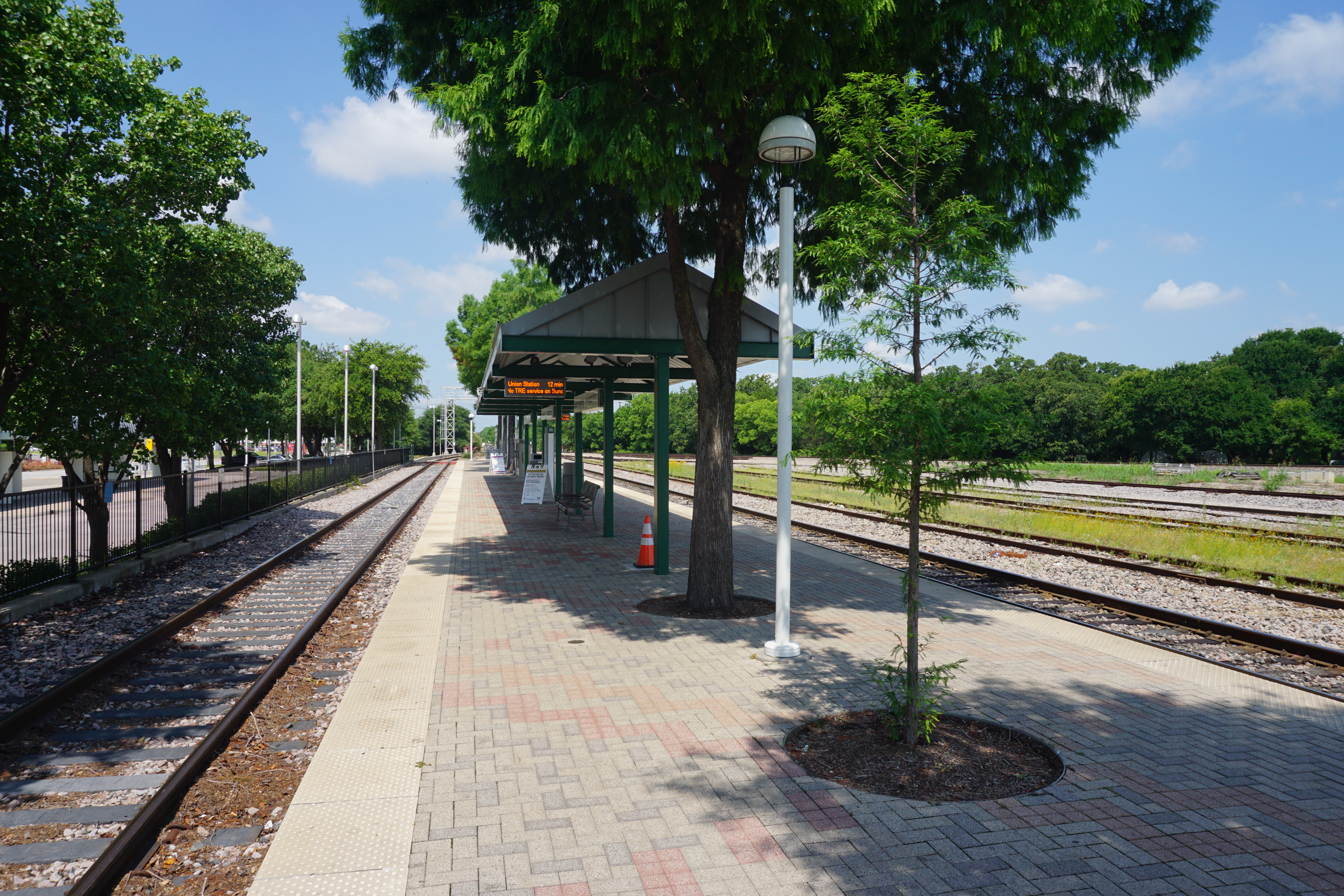
TRE platform (2019)

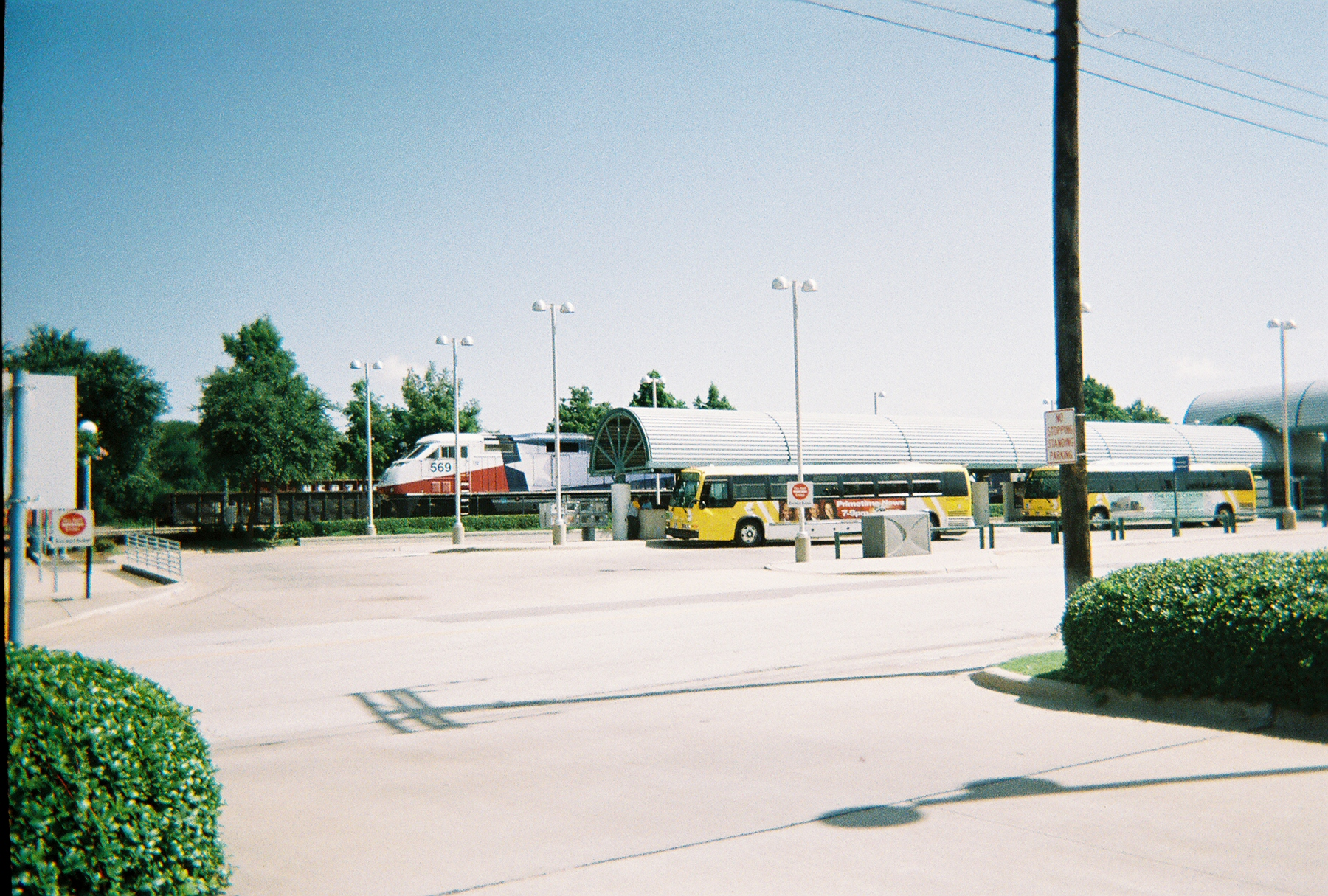
DART buses and TRE awaiting departures (2007)

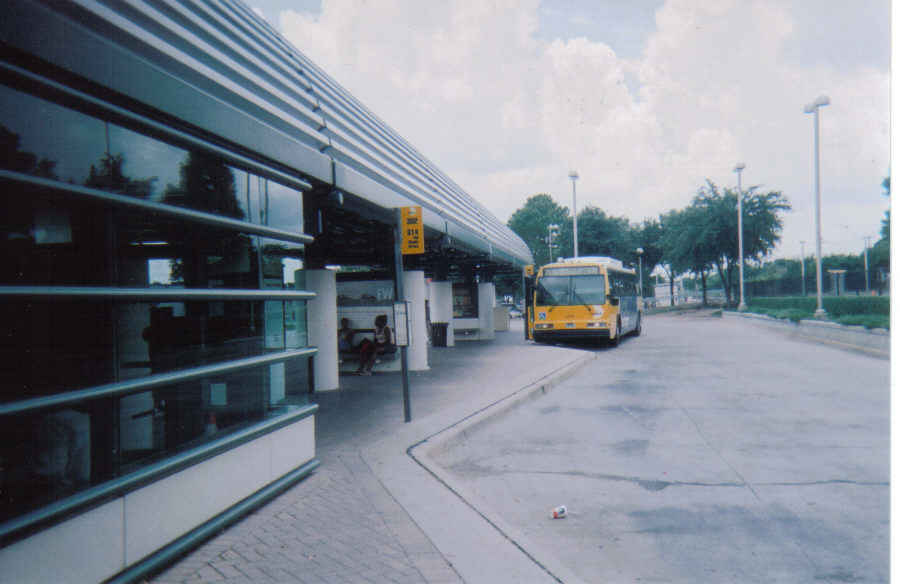
DART bus awaiting departure from South Irving (2007)
