= CentrePort/DFW Airport station =

Commuter rail station in Fort Worth, Texas

CentrePort/DFW Airport
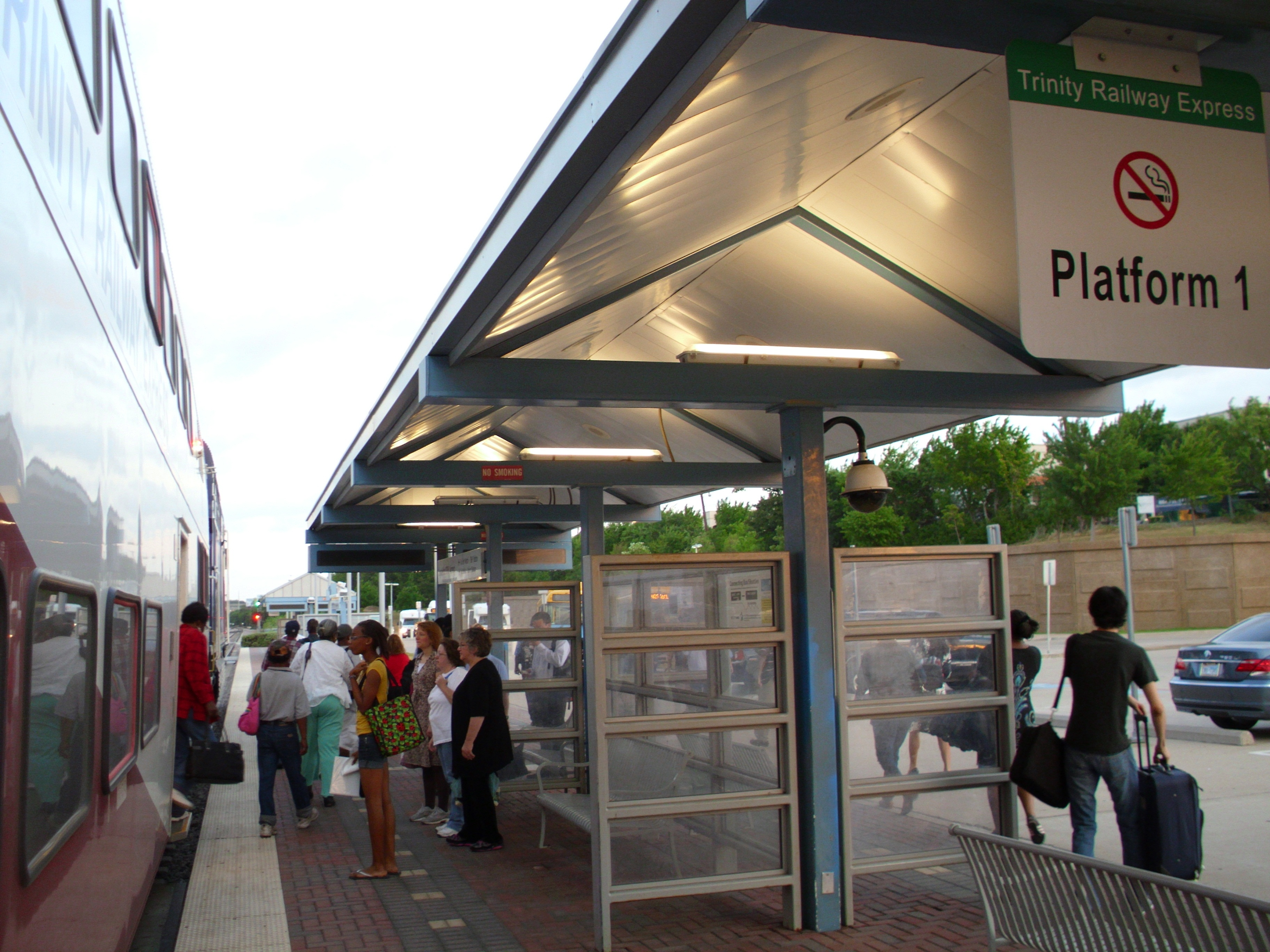
- Riders at CentrePort/DFW Airport station boarding a TRE train.

General information
- Location: 14470 Statler Boulevard; Fort Worth, Texas
- Coordinates: 32°49′01″N 97°03′09″W
- Owner: DART and Trinity Metro
- Line: Trinity Railway Express
- Platforms: 1 side platform, 1 island platform
- Tracks: 2
- Connections: Trinity Metro: 30 East, 30 Amon Carter, 30 West, 31 (TRE Link); Arlington On-Demand

Construction
- Structure type: At-grade
- Parking: 1,001 spaces
- Cycle facilities: 6 bike lockers
- Accessible: Yes

Other information
- Fare zone: East/West boundary

History
- Opened: September 16, 2000

Passengers
- FY 2025: 447 (avg. weekday) ▲6.7%

Services
Preceding station	Trinity Railway Express	Following station
Bell toward T&P Station	Trinity Railway Express	West Irving toward Dallas Union Station
Location

CentrePort/DFW Airport station (shortened to CentrePort/DFW station) is a Trinity Railway Express commuter rail station in Fort Worth, Texas. The station is located near the intersection of Trinity Boulevard and State Highway 360, approximately 6 miles (9.7 km) south of Dallas Fort Worth International Airport.

The station serves both the airport itself (via Trinity Metro's TRE Link shuttle) and the CentrePort business park (via Trinity Metro's CentrePort Circulator routes), and it is also a transfer point for a microtransit service in nearby Arlington. The station is located in both of the TRE's fare zones, allowing riders to access the station with only a local fare from either DART (if traveling westbound) or Trinity Metro (if traveling eastbound).

TRE's service yard is located between CentrePort/DFW station and West Irving station. Because of this, at the end of peak periods and during late nights, some TRE trains terminate at the station to allow the vehicles to exit service.

== Connections ==
=== CentrePort Circulator ===
The CentrePort Circulator (Route 30) is a trio of routes connecting to the CentrePort business park. The circulator consists of the West Loop (which serves western Trinity Boulevard and the headquarters of American Airlines), the Amon Carter Loop (which serves Amon Carter Boulevard) and the East Loop (which serves eastern Trinity Boulevard). These three routes operate only during weekday peak periods (6 AM to 9 AM and 3 PM to 7 PM).

=== TRE Link ===
TRE Link (Route 31) is a shuttle that runs between the station and the lower level of DFW's Terminal B. The line is operated by Trinity Metro, with additional funding from DART and DFW Airport.

A pedestrian walkway connects the DFW bus station to the airport's TEXRail and DART Silver Line station, DART Orange Line station, and Terminal A; the remaining terminals can be accessed using either the landside Terminal Link shuttle or airside Skylink people mover. When traveling northbound, the route also stops at Southgate Plaza, a mixed-use development containing a Hyatt Place hotel and the airport's administrative offices. The shuttle operates every 20-40 minutes during the TRE's operating hours.

=== Arlington ===
Arlington On-Demand is a ride-sharing service operated by Via Transportation. The service provides transportation from CentrePort/DFW station to any location in Arlington city limits. The service is available from 6 AM to 9 PM on weekdays and 9 AM to 9 PM on Saturdays; there is no Sunday service.

== History ==
A station serving the CentrePort business park (and, by shuttle, D/FW Airport) was first announced by the Fort Worth Transportation Authority (nicknamed "The T") in 1996. The station had a Mexican-themed opening ceremony on Saturday, September 16, 2000 and entered regular service the following Monday; the Hurst/Bell and Richland Hills stations opened on the same day. By that time, Dallas Area Rapid Transit had already begun shuttle service between the station and the airport.

Under the TRE's original three-zone fare structure, CentrePort/DFW station was located in the central zone, and a trip from either Downtown Dallas or Downtown Fort Worth to it would cost $2. When the TRE was extended to Fort Worth, this was replaced with a county-based zone structure: trips between CentrePort/DFW and the rest of Tarrant County would cost $1, while trips from or to Dallas County would cost $2. In 2010, the fare system was changed so that CentrePort/DFW was in both zones, making trips to either city the same cost once again.

At opening, the station's park-and-ride lot contained 268 spaces. Due to higher-than-expected demand, this was expanded to 408 spaces in 2001 and again to 1,016 spaces in 2004.

In late 2007, a second track and platform were added to the station. This was part of a larger $22 million project to build a bridge over an unstable rock formation just east of the station, which double-tracked the corridor in the process.

In 2018, Fort Worth announced finalized plans for a trail connecting CentrePort/DFW to River Legacy Park in Arlington. This was a component of the 64-mile (103 km) DFW Discovery Trail connecting Fort Worth and Dallas. Construction on this trail began in August 2024. Another DFW Discovery Trail segment, which will connect CentrePort/DFW to Mike Lewis Park in Grand Prairie, is scheduled to begin construction in 2026.

In October 2024, plans were announced for a transit-oriented development project on a 25-acre (10 ha) plot south of the station.

=== Connections to Arlington ===
Before the TRE was opened, preliminary plans were made for a second rail line connecting CentrePort/DFW to downtown Arlington along the Dorothy Spur, a rail corridor paralleling SH 360. The plan would require the spur to be extended approximately 1 mile (1.6 km) north to the station.

In August 2000, the Arlington Entertainment Area Management District, which runs shuttle routes between Arlington hotels and local attractions, proposed a shuttle service between CentrePort/DFW and The Ballpark in Arlington. The proposal was rejected by Arlington city council, which would have funded the service. Three years later, a similar proposal by the city government itself was rejected due to budgetary concerns. In 2006, the University of Texas at Arlington (UTA) began operating a shuttle route to the station.

In 2013, Arlington announced plans for a two-year pilot shuttle between CentrePort/DFW, downtown Arlington, and the UTA campus, with funding provided by UTA and local businesses. The shuttle, dubbed Metro Arlington Xpress (MAX), was launched on August 17. The shuttle was renewed for another two-year period in 2015.

In late 2017, Arlington opted to replace the MAX shuttle with a microtransit service operated by Via Transportation. The service initially connected CentrePort/DFW to UTA, downtown Arlington, and Arlington's entertainment district (including Six Flags Over Texas, Globe Life Park, and AT&T Stadium). Service was gradually expanded to cover more of Arlington, with the entire city limits being served by 2021.

In 2025, Arlington and Via launched a fixed-route shuttle pilot, named Arlington Express, which directly connected CentrePort/DFW to downtown Arlington and UTA. The shuttle ran during weekday peak periods with 30-minute headways. Despite being intended as a three-year pilot program, Arlington Express was quietly discontinued one year later.
