= Trinity Lakes station =

Commuter rail station in Fort Worth, Texas

Trinity Lakes

General information
- Location: 7979 Trinity Boulevard; Fort Worth, Texas
- Coordinates: 32.8055°N 97.2095°W
- Owner: Trinity Metro
- Line: Trinity Railway Express
- Platforms: 2 side platforms
- Tracks: 2
- Connections: Trinity Metro: 55; TCC Northeast On-Demand

Construction
- Structure type: At-grade
- Parking: 500 spaces
- Accessible: Yes

Other information
- Fare zone: West

History
- Opened: February 19, 2024

Passengers
- FY 2025: 276 (avg. weekday) ▲16.5%

Services
Preceding station	Trinity Railway Express	Following station
Fort Worth Central Station toward T&P Station	Trinity Railway Express	Bell toward Dallas Union Station
Location

Trinity Lakes station is a Trinity Railway Express commuter rail station. The station is located in eastern Fort Worth, Texas, on the border with Hurst, Texas, just to the east of Interstate 820 and north of Trinity Boulevard. The station is a part of Trinity Lakes, a 1,600-acre master planned mixed-use transit-oriented development.

The station is a park-and-ride lot. An on-demand service operated by Trinity Metro connects the station to Tarrant County College Northeast Campus in Hurst.

The area was previously serviced by Richland Hills station, located 4/5 mile (1.3 km) to the west at the intersection of Handley–Ederville Road and Airport Freeway (SH 121) in Richland Hills. Trinity Lakes replaced the Richland Hills station in February 2024.

== History ==
=== Richland Hills station ===
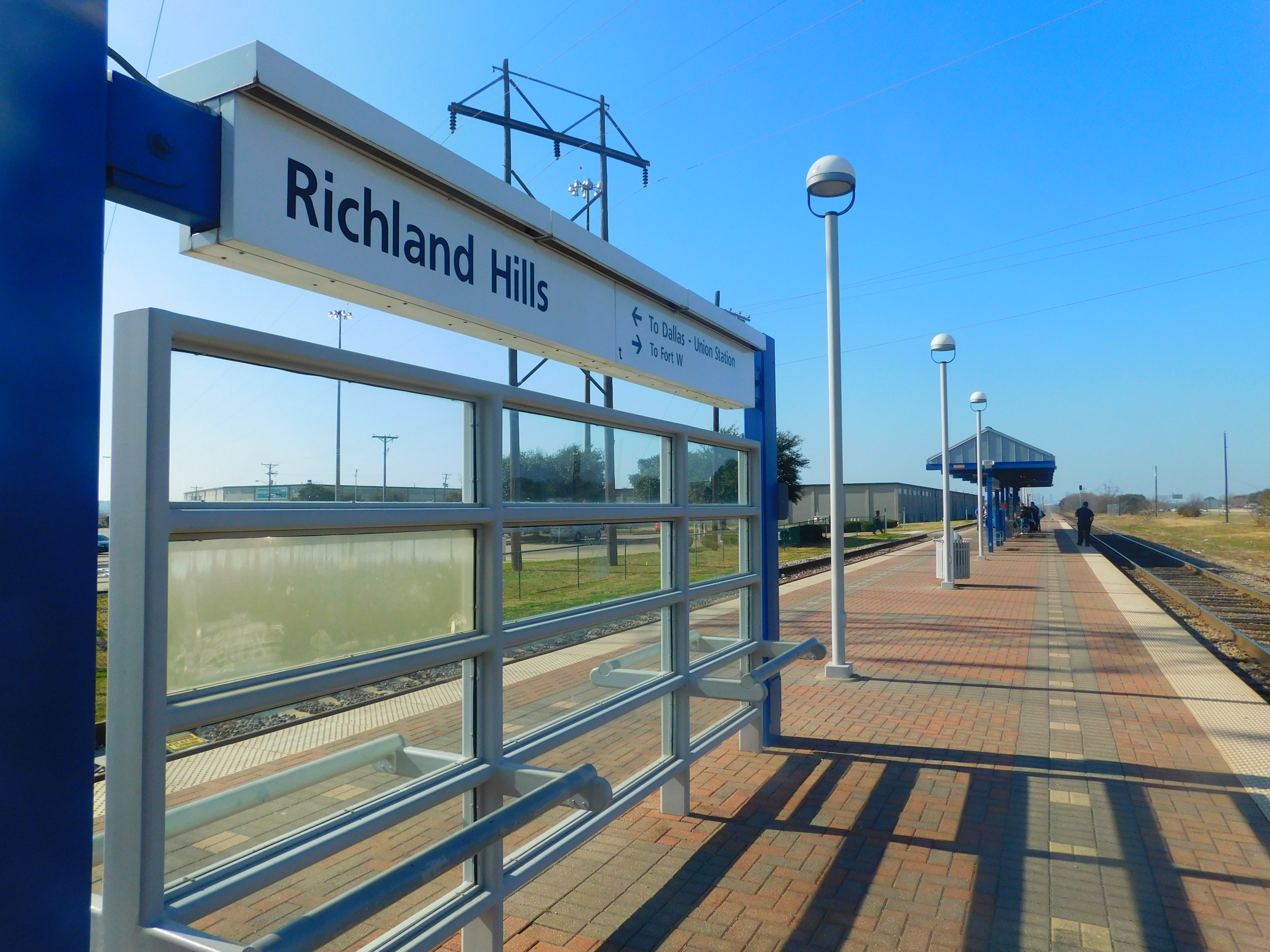
Richland Hills station in February 2017

Richland Hills joined the Fort Worth Transportation Authority (FWTA, now Trinity Metro) in May 1992. Construction for the station started in January 1999. The station opened on September 16, 2000, with a parade, an opening ceremony (celebrating both the station and the city's 50th anniversary), and an inaugural train. The Bell and CentrePort stations opened the same day; all three entered regular service two days later. The Richland Hills station served as the western terminus of the TRE until its extension to Downtown Fort Worth on December 3, 2001.

The station opened with a 178-space parking lot, which was expanded to 318 spaces the following year. In 2011, FWTA began a $2 million improvement project for the station, which further expanded the parking lot to 480 spaces and realigned Burns Street, the station's primary entrance. This created a pocket of undeveloped land for a future transit-oriented development project, though no development ever occurred.

In November 2016, Richland Hills held a citywide referendum on its membership in FWTA. The vote, which was the fourth on FWTA membership in the city's history, resulted in the city leaving FWTA. FWTA's bus and paratransit services in Richland Hills ceased. However, Richland Hills station remained open, as most of the commuters using the station were not Richland Hills residents.

=== Trinity Lakes station ===
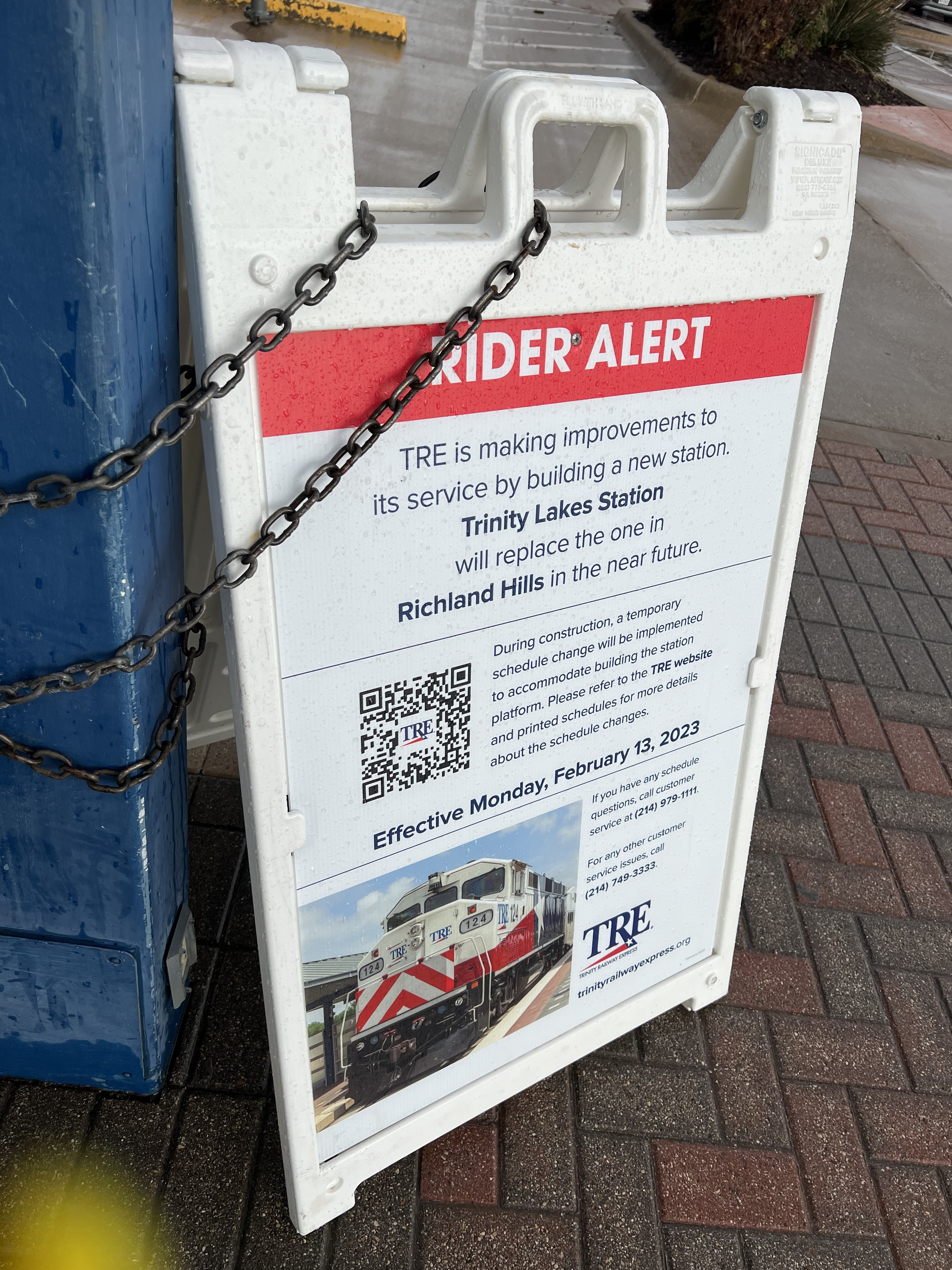
Signage at CentrePort/DFW Airport station announcing the closure and replacement of Richland Hills station

In 2012, the city of Fort Worth created a tax increment financing district for Trinity Lakes, a proposed mixed-use transit-oriented development adjacent to the Trinity Railway Express commuter rail service. A TRE station was proposed for the development, and it was speculated as a potential replacement for Richland Hills station as early as 2015.

Formal plans for a station at Trinity Lakes began in 2018, with Richland Hills initially slated for closure in 2020. The decision to close Richland Hills station was also due in part to the city of Richland Hills choosing to discontinue public transport services with Trinity Metro. Regardless, the location of the station was also selected in part due to its proximity to Richland Hills. Following delays, construction on the Trinity Lakes station began in February 2023, with Trinity Railway Express implementing temporary service changes on February 13, 2023, and Trinity Metro on its route 23 on February 27, 2023, to accommodate for the construction. Construction on the station, which was entirely federally funded, cost $26.7 million, which sits atop the site of a former sand and gravel mine. Richland Hills station would close on February 17, 2024, two days before the opening of Trinity Lakes station, which opened on February 19, 2024.

Both of the bus routes that served Richland Hills were moved to Trinity Lakes. Later that year, route 23, which offered non-stop service to Tarrant County College Northeast Campus, was replaced by an on-demand service serving the campus.
