= West Irving station =

Commuter rail station in Irving, Texas

West Irving
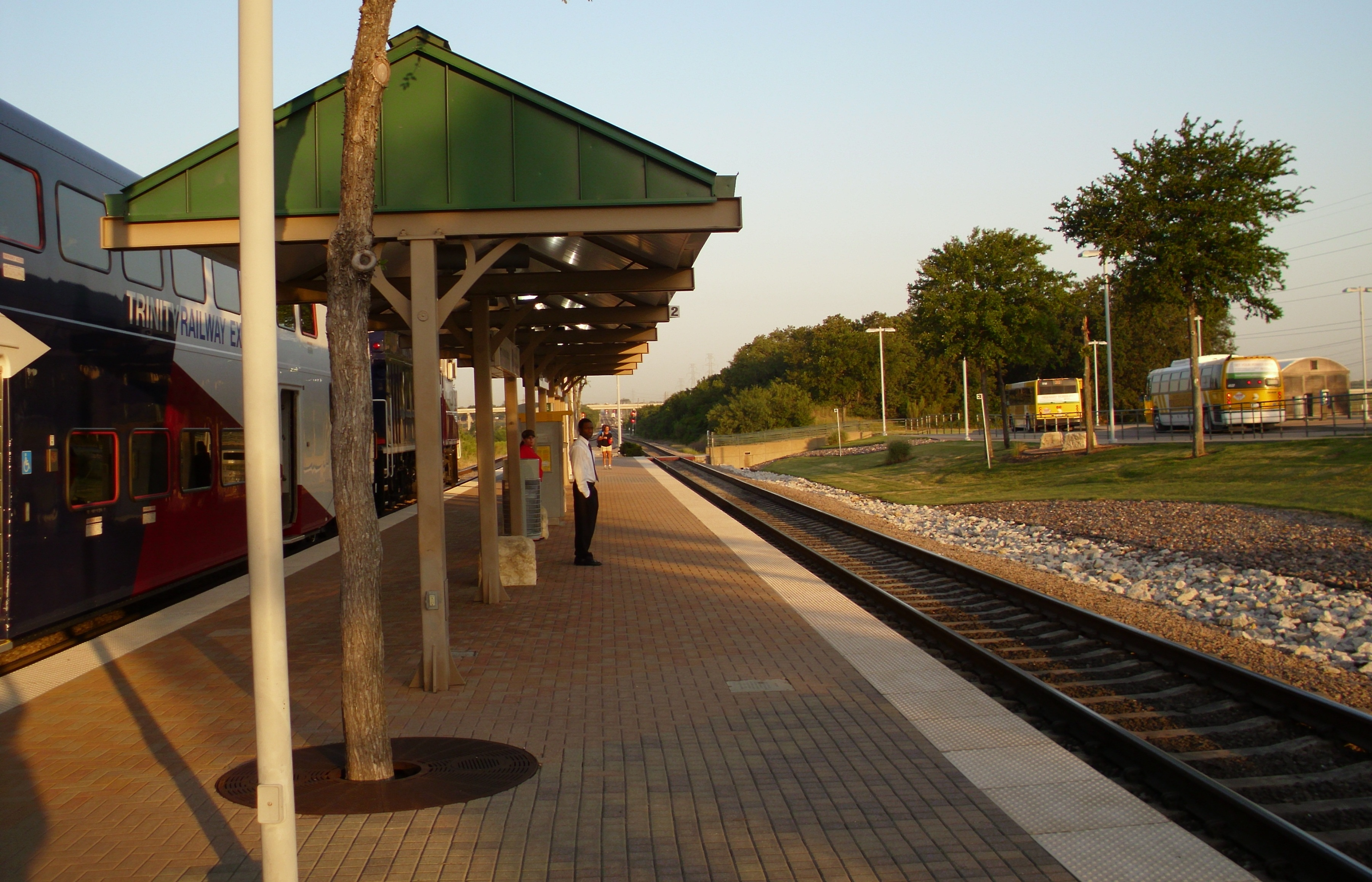
- DART buses and TRE trains awaiting departure.

General information
- Location: 4200 Jackson Street; Irving, Texas
- Coordinates: 32.8161°N 97.0072°W
- Owner: Dallas Area Rapid Transit
- Line: Trinity Railway Express
- Platforms: 1 island platform
- Tracks: 2
- Connections: South Irving GoLink Zone (M-Sun) Passport Park/Bear Creek GoLink Zone (M-Sun)

Construction
- Structure type: At-grade
- Parking: 537 spaces
- Cycle facilities: 4 lockers, 1 rack
- Accessible: Yes

Other information
- Fare zone: East

History
- Opened: November 13, 2000

Passengers
- FY 2025: 217 (avg. weekday) ▲7.4%

Services
Preceding station	Trinity Railway Express	Following station
CentrePort/DFW Airport toward T&P Station	Trinity Railway Express	Downtown Irving/Heritage Crossing toward Dallas Union Station
Location

West Irving station is a Trinity Railway Express commuter rail station in the Bear Creek neighborhood of Irving, Texas. The station is located between President George Bush Turnpike and Belt Line Road, approximately 1 1/2 miles (2.4 km) south of Airport Freeway (SH 183). The station serves as both a park-and-ride and a connection point for microtransit serving southern and western Irving.

As of the 2025 fiscal year, the station has the lowest weekday ridership of all TRE stations, with an average of 217 riders per day.

== History ==
The station opened November 13, 2000. Bus routes at the station initially served Irving Mall, Las Colinas, and North Lake College.

In 2022, all bus routes serving the station were replaced with GoLink, a microtransit service.
