= Dallas Fort Worth International Airport =

International airport in Texas, United States

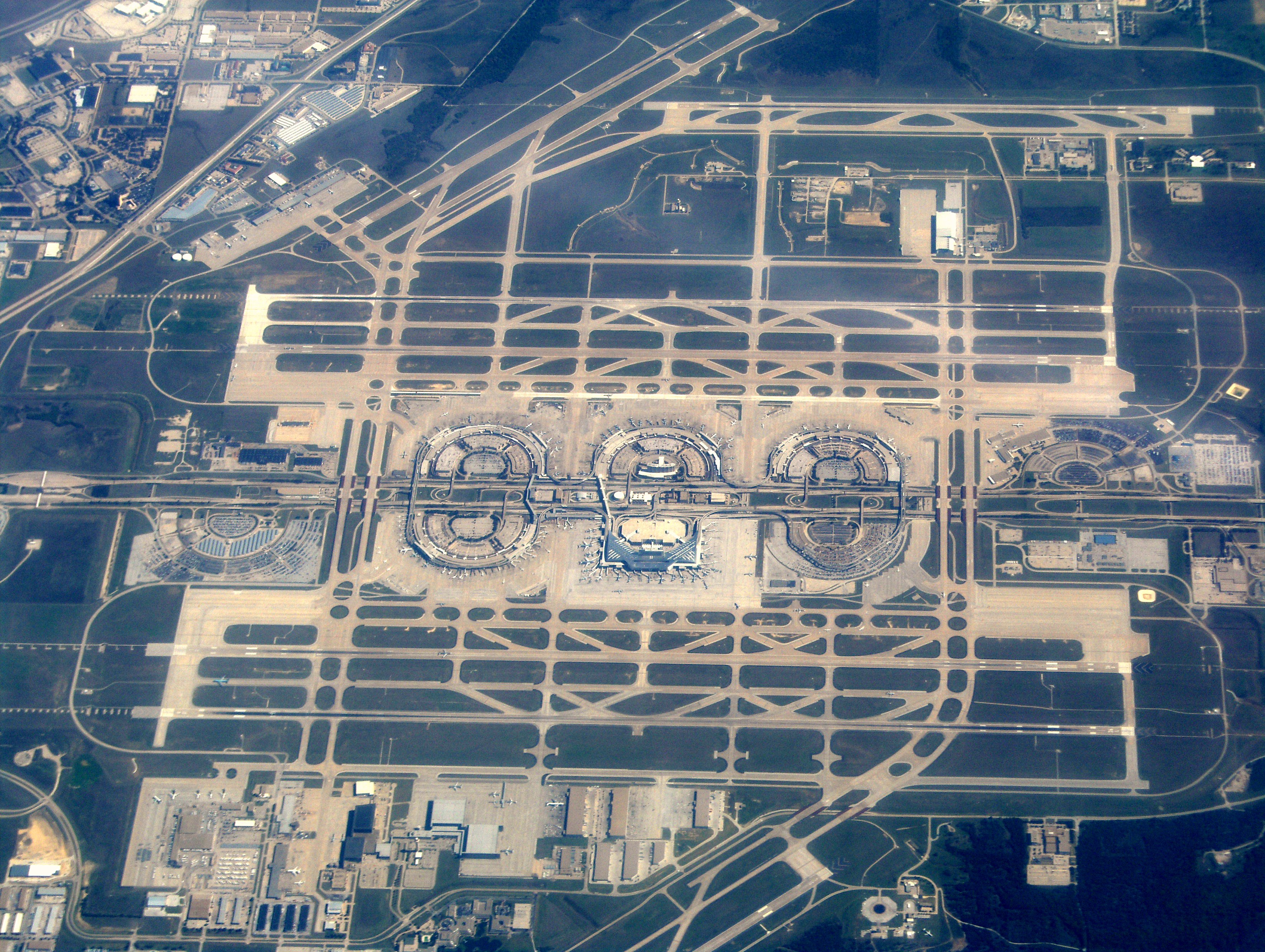
- Aerial view of the airport
- IATA: DFW; ICAO: KDFW; FAA LID: DFW; WMO: 72259

Summary
- Airport type: Public
- Owner: Cities of Dallas and Fort Worth
- Operator: DFW Airport Board
- Serves: Dallas–Fort Worth metroplex; North Texas
- Location: Cities of Grapevine, Irving, Euless, and Coppell in Tarrant and Dallas counties, Texas, U.S.
- Opened: January 13, 1974; 52 years ago
- Hub for: American Airlines; Ameriflight; Southern Airways Express; UPS Airlines
- Operating base for: Frontier Airlines
- Time zone: CST (UTC−06:00)
  - Summer (DST): CDT (UTC−05:00)
- Elevation AMSL: 185 m (607 ft)
- Coordinates: 32°53′49″N 97°02′17″W
- Website: www.dfwairport.com

Maps
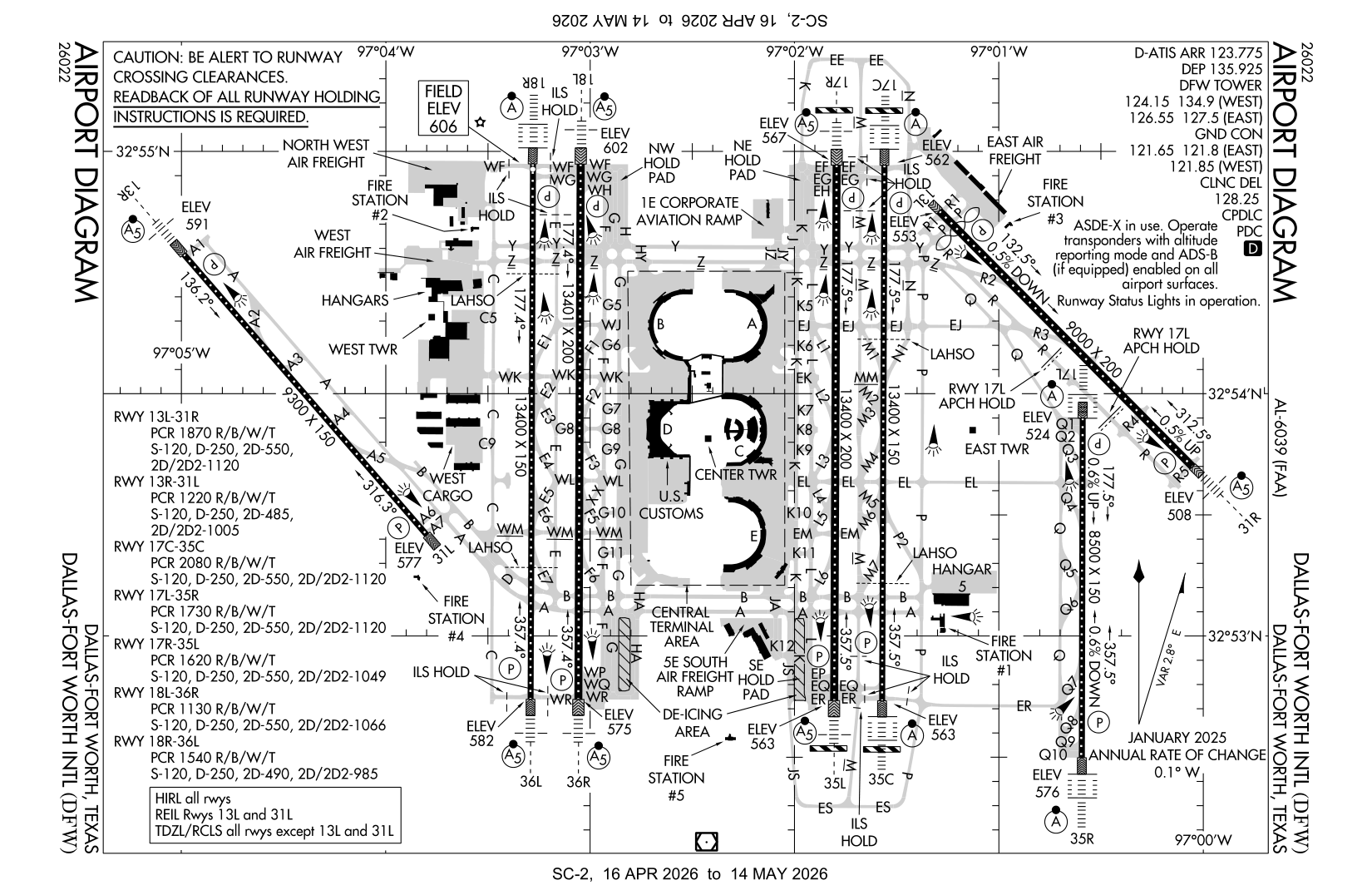
- FAA airport diagram
- Interactive map of Dallas Fort Worth International Airport

Runways
Direction	Length		Surface
Direction	m	ft	Surface
13L/31R	2,743	9,000	Concrete
13R/31L	2,835	9,300	Concrete
17L/35R	2,591	8,500	Asphalt concrete
17C/35C	4,084	13,400	Asphalt concrete
17R/35L	4,084	13,400	Concrete
18L/36R	4,084	13,400	Concrete
18R/36L	4,084	13,400	Asphalt concrete

Statistics (2025)
- Passengers: 85,660,127 ▼2.5%
- Rank (world): 4th
- Aircraft operations: 743,394
- Cargo: 858,952.3 tons
- Sources: Dallas Fort Worth International Airport

Dallas Fort Worth International Airport (IATA: DFW, ICAO: KDFW, FAA LID: DFW) is the primary international airport serving the Dallas–Fort Worth metroplex and the North Texas region, in the U.S. state of Texas. It is located approximately 16 miles (26 km) northwest of Downtown Dallas and 20 miles (32 km) northeast of Downtown Fort Worth.

It is the largest hub for American Airlines, which is headquartered near the airport, and is the third-busiest airport in the world by aircraft movements and the second-busiest airport in the world by passenger traffic in 2022 and 2023, according to the Airports Council International. As of 2025, it is the eighth-busiest international gateway in the United States and the busiest international gateway in Texas. The hub that American Airlines operates at DFW is the second-largest single airline hub in the world, behind only Delta Air Lines' hub in Atlanta.

Located roughly halfway between the major cities of Dallas and Fort Worth, DFW spreads across portions of Dallas and Tarrant counties and includes portions of the cities of Grapevine, Irving, Euless, and Coppell. Owning 17,207 acres (69.63 km^{2}; 26.886 sq mi), DFW is the second-largest airport by land area in the United States after Denver International Airport. It has its own police, fire protection, and emergency medical services.

DFW Airport has service to 269 destinations (196 domestic, 73 international) from 29 passenger airlines. As of April 2023, DFW Airport has service to more nonstop destinations than any other airport in North America. It is also the largest carbon neutral airport in the world and the first in North America to achieve this status.

== History ==
=== Planning ===
As early as 1927, before the area had an airport, Dallas proposed a joint airport with Fort Worth. Fort Worth declined the offer and thus each city opened its own airport, Love Field in Dallas and Meacham Field in Fort Worth, each of which had scheduled airline service.

In 1940, the Civil Aeronautics Administration earmarked US$1,900,000 (equivalent to $43,700,000 in 2025) for the construction of a Dallas/Fort Worth Regional Airport. American Airlines and Braniff Airways struck a deal with the city of Arlington to build an airport there, but the governments of Dallas and Fort Worth disagreed over its construction and the project was abandoned in 1942. After World War II, Fort Worth annexed the site and developed it into Amon Carter Field with the help of American Airlines. In 1953, Fort Worth transferred its commercial flights from Meacham to the new airport, which was 12 miles (19 km) from Love Field. In 1960, Fort Worth purchased Amon Carter Field and renamed it Greater Southwest International Airport (GSW) in an attempt to compete with Dallas' airport, but GSW's traffic continued to decline relative to Love Field. By the mid-1960s, Fort Worth was getting 1% of Texas air traffic while Dallas was getting 49%, which led to the virtual abandonment of GSW.

The joint airport proposal was revisited in 1961 after the Federal Aviation Administration (FAA) refused to invest more money into separate Dallas and Fort Worth airports. While airline service had steeply declined at both GSW and Meacham, Love Field was congested and had no more room to expand. Following an order from the federal government in 1964 that it would unilaterally choose a site if the cities could not come to an agreement, officials from the two cities finally agreed on a location for a new regional airport that was just north of the near-abandoned GSW and almost equidistant from the two city centers. The land was purchased by the cities in 1966 and construction began in 1969. The cost of the first phase of Dallas/Fort Worth Regional Airport was estimated at $700 million.

Voters went to the polls in cities throughout the Dallas–Fort Worth metroplex to approve the new North Texas Regional Airport, which was named after the North Texas Commission that was instrumental in the regional airport coming to fruition. The North Texas Commission formed the North Texas Airport Commission to oversee the planning and construction of the giant airport. Area voters approved the airport referendum and the new North Texas Regional Airport would become a reality. However, many Dallas residents remained satisfied with Love Field, and an attempt to establish an independent Dallas Fort Worth Regional Airport Authority—despite strong backing from the Dallas Chamber of Commerce and Dallas mayor J. Erik Jonsson—failed when Dallas voters rejected the proposal by a narrow margin. After further negotiation, the cities instead established an appointed airport board consisting of seven members from Dallas and four from Fort Worth and were able to persuade all existing air carriers at Love, GSW, and Meacham to move to the new regional airport.

Under the original 1967 airport design, DFW was to have pier-shaped terminals perpendicular to a central highway. In 1968, the design was revised to provide for semicircular terminals, which served to isolate loading and unloading areas from the central highway, and to provide additional room for parking in the middle of each semicircle. The plan proposed thirteen such terminals, but only four were built initially.

=== Opening and early operations ===
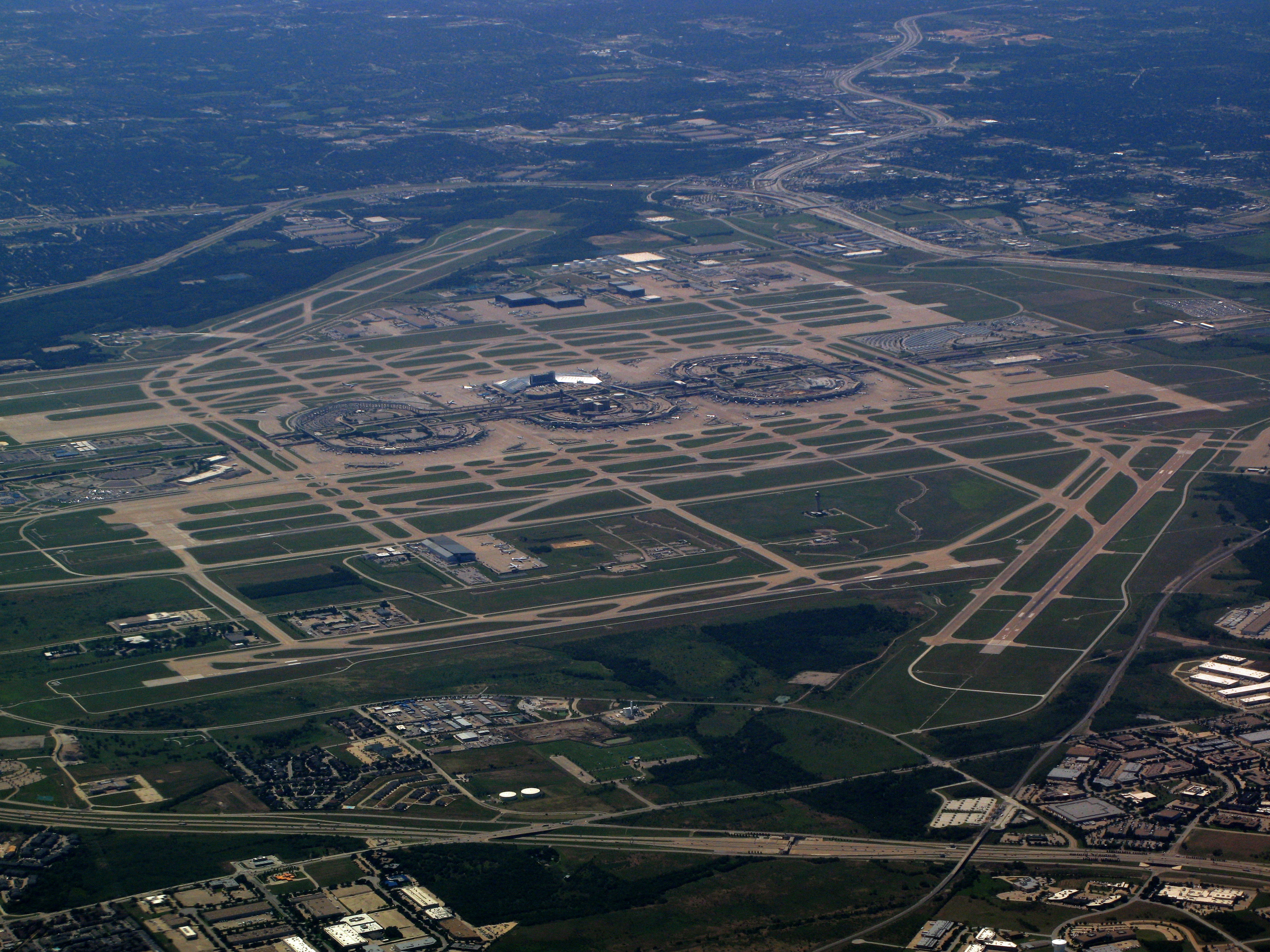
Aerial view of DFW in 2013

DFW held an open house and dedication ceremony on September 20–23, 1973, which included the first landing of a supersonic Concorde in the United States, that being pre-production aircraft F-WTSA wearing the colors of both Air France and British Airways, en route from Caracas to Paris. The attendees at the airport's dedication included former Texas Governor John Connally, Transportation Secretary Claude Brinegar, U.S. Senator Lloyd Bentsen and Texas Governor Dolph Briscoe. The airport opened for commercial service as Dallas/Fort Worth Regional Airport on January 13, 1974, at a cost of $875 million (equivalent to $5.5 billion in 2024), which included $65 million for the land and $810 million in total construction costs. At the time of DFW's opening, its property of 17,500 acres (27.3 sq mi; 7,100 ha; 71 km^{2}) made it the largest airport in the world in terms of land area. The first flight to land was American Airlines Flight 341 from New York, which had stopped in Memphis and Little Rock. The surrounding cities began to annex the airport property into their city limits shortly after the airport was developed. The name change to Dallas/Fort Worth International did not occur until 1985.

An innovative feature of the airport during its early history was the Vought Airtrans, the world's first operational fully automated people mover system. Later rebranded as the Airport Train and then the TrAAin ("AA" signifying American Airlines), the system ultimately encompassed 13 mi (21 km) of fixed guideways and transported as many as 23,000 persons per day at a maximum speed of 17 mph (27 km/h).

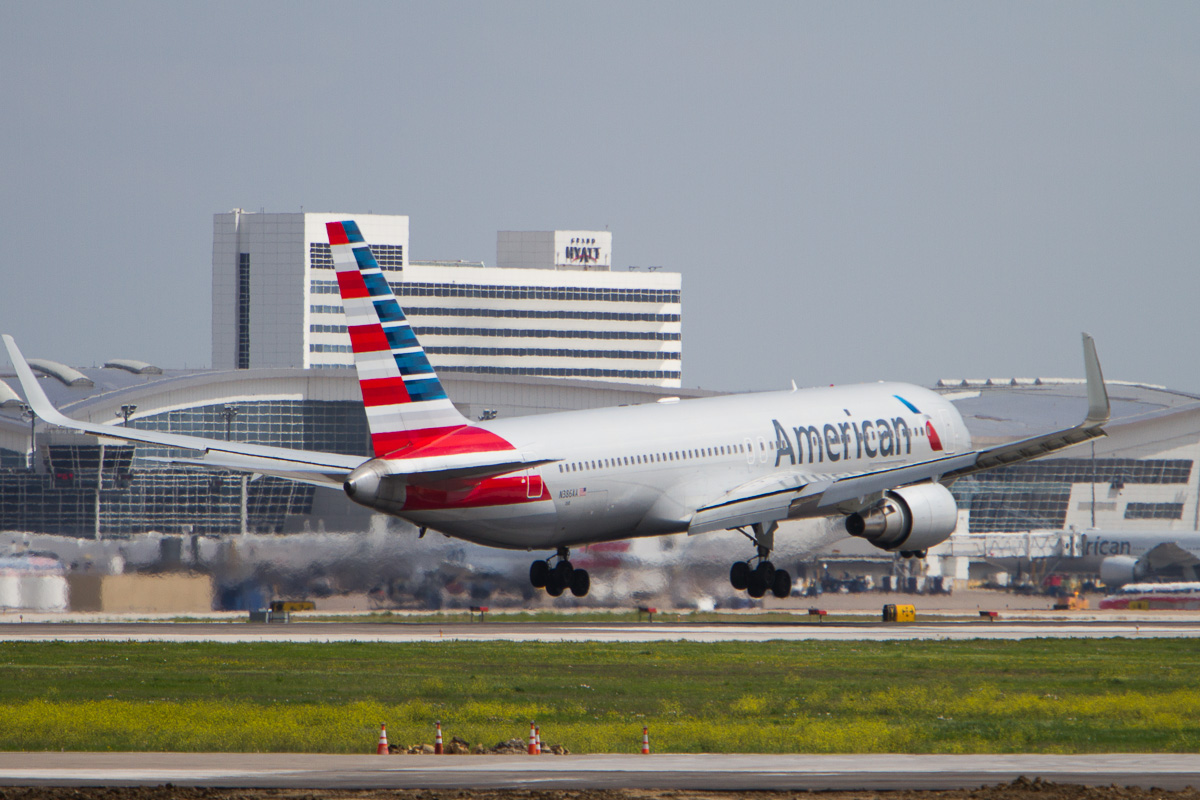
American Airlines is headquartered near DFW, the airline's primary hub.

When it opened, DFW had four terminals, numbered 2W, 2E, 3E and 4E. During its first year of operations, the airport was served by American Airlines, Braniff International Airways, Continental Airlines, Delta Air Lines, Eastern Air Lines, Frontier Airlines, (Note: The modern Frontier Airlines company, founded in 1994, is separate and distinct from Frontier Airlines (1950–1986), which went bankrupt in 1986 and had its remaining operations absorbed by Continental Airlines.) Ozark Air Lines, Rio Airways and Texas International Airlines.

Southwest Airlines had not begun flights when the other airlines agreed to move from Love Field to DFW, and it had only received approval to fly within the state of Texas. It refused to move to DFW because it felt that convenience for Dallas residents was central to its business. After the Airline Deregulation Act was enacted in 1978, Southwest announced flights to other states. Local officials feared that the resumption of long-distance flights at Love would threaten DFW's financial stability, prompting the enaction of the Wright Amendment in 1979, which banned airliners with more than 56 seats from operating between Love Field and airports beyond Texas and its four neighboring states: Arkansas, Louisiana, New Mexico, and Oklahoma.

Braniff International Airways was a major operator at DFW in the airport's early years, operating a hub from Terminal 2W with international flights to South America and Mexico from 1974, London from 1978, and Europe and Asia from 1979, as well as extensive domestic service before ceasing all operations in 1982. During the Braniff hub era, DFW was one of only four U.S. airports to have scheduled Concorde service; Braniff commenced scheduled Concorde service from Dallas to Washington from 1979 to 1980, using British Airways and Air France aircraft temporarily re-registered to Braniff while flying within the United States. British Airways later briefly flew Concordes to Dallas in 1988 as a substitute for its ordinarily scheduled DC-10 service.

=== Deregulation era ===
Following airline deregulation, American Airlines (which had already been one of the largest carriers serving the Dallas/Fort Worth area for many years) established its first hub at DFW on June 11, 1981. American finished moving its headquarters from Grand Prairie, Texas, to a building in Fort Worth located on the site of the old Greater Southwest International Airport, near DFW Airport on January 17, 1983; the airline began leasing the facility from the airport, which owns the facility. By 1984, the American hub occupied most of Terminal 3E and part of Terminal 2E. American's hub grew to fill all of Terminal 2E by 1991. American also began long-haul international service from DFW, adding flights to London in 1982 and Tokyo in 1987.

Delta Air Lines also built up a hub operation at DFW, which occupied most of Terminal 4E through the 1990s. The Delta hub peaked around 1991, when Delta had a 35% market share at DFW; its share was halved by 2004, after many of its mainline routes were downgraded to more frequent regional jet service in 2003.

=== The Wright Amendment ===
In the late 20th century, the Wright Amendment had become unpopular with travelers and business groups because it suppressed local airline competition, but it was backed by powerful political interests including American Airlines, which did not want direct low-fare competition from Southwest Airlines at its DFW fortress hub. Efforts to revise the amendment in the 1980s and early 1990s became mired in lawsuits and political wrangling. In a 2023 statement to The Dallas Morning News, former American Airlines chief executive officer Robert Crandall said that at the time, a Wright repeal was a greater threat to American Airlines than to DFW Airport.

The Wright Amendment status quo was upset between 1996 and 2000, when new states were added to the Wright service area and several airlines began long-distance service from Love Field under the previously unexploited 56-seat exemption. This broke Southwest's monopoly at Love Field, threatened highly profitable American Airlines routes at DFW, and proved that changes to the amendment were now politically viable. Southwest soon began campaigning to repeal the Wright Amendment, but was staunchly opposed by American Airlines, which feared that Southwest would maintain its near-monopoly at Love Field while simultaneously expanding to DFW Airport and possibly Fort Worth Alliance Airport or Meacham Airport.

In a 2006 agreement brokered by Kay Bailey Hutchison, U.S. Senator from Texas, DFW Airport, Dallas, Fort Worth, Southwest, and American agreed to support the repeal under the condition that the number of gates at Love Field was permanently capped. The agreement also required all international passenger flights in the metroplex to operate from DFW Airport, and Southwest faced penalties if it or a codeshare agreement partner offered flights from DFW, but these provisions expired on January 1, 2025.

On October 13, 2014, the Wright Amendment domestic flight restrictions ended, allowing airlines to fly from Love Field to anywhere in the U.S. Despite the increased competition, the number of annual enplanements at DFW grew by five million from 2013 to 2015, only slightly less than an approximately six million passenger increase at Love Field during the same period.

=== 20th century expansion ===
Delta constructed and opened a satellite terminal to Terminal 4E in 1989 to accommodate their hub operations. This small terminal, originally with 9 gates, was connected to Terminal 4E by a 650-foot (200 m) underground walkway, although they used transporters when it initially opened. In 1996, Delta subleased the satellite terminal to Atlantic Southeast Airlines, their Delta Connection commuter partner.

In 1989, the airport authority announced plans to rebuild the existing terminals and add two runways. After an environmental impact study was released the following year, the cities of Irving, Euless and Grapevine sued the airport over its extension plans, and the legal battle continued until the US Supreme Court ruled in favor of the airport in 1994. The seventh runway (17L/35R) opened in 1996; the four primary north–south runways (those closest to the terminals) were all lengthened from 11,388 feet (3,471 m) to their present length of 13,400 feet (4,084 m). The first, 17R/35L, was extended in 1996 (at the same time the new runway was constructed) and the other three (17C/35C, 18L/36R, and 18R/36L) were extended in 2005. DFW is now the only airport in the world with four serviceable paved runways longer than 4,000 meters (13,123 ft).

The addition of the nine gates from the Delta satellite terminal brought the total for DFW to 118 gates by the late 1990s, although some are able to service two planes simultaneously. Terminal operations in the late 1990s were controlled by the DFW Airport (Terminal 2W), American Airlines (2E and 3E, a total of 44 gates and 56 airplane parking spaces), and Delta Airlines (4E and the 4E satellite).

=== 21st century operations ===
In 2000, the airport changed the names of the four main terminals. 2W became B. 2E became A. 3E became C. And Terminal 4E became E. When American Eagle opened their new satellite terminal on November 4, 2000, it was approximately where a terminal 1E would have been on the original naming scheme. The 13-gate, 25,000-square-foot (2,300 m^{2}) satellite terminal was accessed by shuttle bus from Terminal A; the satellite was used for commercial commuter flights until 2005.

The airport would eventually convert the American Eagle terminal north of Terminal A to its DFW Corporate Aviation facility in 2010 in preparation for Super Bowl XLV. The corporate aviation facility has no gates as it caters to privately-owned business jets and their clientele who do not pass through security checks.

Delta closed its DFW hub in 2004 and placed its old Terminal E (formerly 4E) satellite in mothballs. Delta was in the midst of a restructuring to avoid bankruptcy, cutting its DFW operation to only 21 flights a day from over 250. Delta redeployed aircraft to hubs in Cincinnati, Atlanta, and Salt Lake City. Prior to the closure, Delta had a 17.3% market share at DFW.

Terminal D, built for international flights, and Skylink, a modern bidirectional people mover system, opened in 2005. The remaining Airport Train system, which had been mostly replaced by buses in 2003, had been fully decommissioned weeks earlier. The largest commercial aircraft in the world, the Airbus A380, made its inaugural arrival at DFW in September 2014 and was handled at Terminal D.

From 2004 to 2012, DFW was one of two US Army "Personnel Assistance Points" that received US troops returning from wars in Iraq and Afghanistan for rest and recuperation. This ended on March 14, 2012, leaving Hartsfield–Jackson Atlanta International Airport as the sole Personnel Assistance Point.

DFW Airport tentatively completed a $2.7 billion "Terminal Renewal and Improvement Program" (TRIP), which encompassed renovations of three of the original four terminals (A, B, and E). Work on the project began following the conclusion of Super Bowl XLV in February 2011. Terminal A was the first terminal to undergo these renovations, which were completed in January 2017 at a cost of about $1 billion. This was followed by the completion of Terminal E in August 2017 and Terminal B in December 2017. While Terminal C was originally part of the multibillion-dollar renovations, American Airlines in 2014 asked to delay renovations of the terminal.

Airports Council International (ACI) named DFW Airport the best large airport with more than 40 million passengers in North America for passenger satisfaction in 2016.

In June 2018, DFW Airport opened a fully functioning, free standing emergency room on airport grounds, located in Southgate Plaza near the Airport Headquarters and Rental Car Center. With this opening, the facility became the first actual ER on an airport's property anywhere around the globe.

The unused Terminal E satellite (the old Delta satellite terminal built in 1989) was remodeled and opened in May 2019 for American Eagle operations, simultaneously expanding it to 15 gates from its original 9.

Gate C35, one of the "High C gates" renovated and added in 2022

In early 2023, Frontier Airlines established a crew operating base at DFW and added a gate to accommodate additional flights.

In 2023, DFW served 81,764,044 passengers, a record for the facility, exceeding 80 million passengers for the first time in the airport's 50-year history.

=== Future ===
DFW Airport has embarked on a series of expansion projects expected to continue through 2028.

The first phase involves construction of Terminal F, DFW's sixth terminal, originally approved in 2023 as a 15-gate concourse costing $1.63 billion, scheduled for completion between 2024 and 2026. Earlier plans had envisioned 24 gates at a cost of $3.5 billion. This initial design lacked landside facilities, with passengers processed in an expansion of Terminal E and reaching Terminal F via Skylink.

In May 2025, DFW and American Airlines announced an expanded $4 billion plan, increasing Terminal F to 31 gates with landside facilities, including ticketing, check-in, security screening, baggage claim, and a large parking structure with integrated drop-off and baggage areas. The design adds international-capable gates and connects directly to Terminal D via a walkway. American will occupy all 31 gates, with the first 15 gates opening in 2027 (as originally scheduled) and additional phases following. The expansion will allow DFW to reallocate gates in Terminals D and E to other airlines. This expansion was needed due to the substantial growth that DFW is facing today, being the third busiest airport in the world, and soon reaching over 100 million passengers by the end of the decade.

The second phase includes long-delayed Terminal C renovations, new piers adding nine gates to Terminals A and C, and roadway upgrades. This $2.72 billion effort is expected to wrap up by 2028.

== Composition and facilities ==
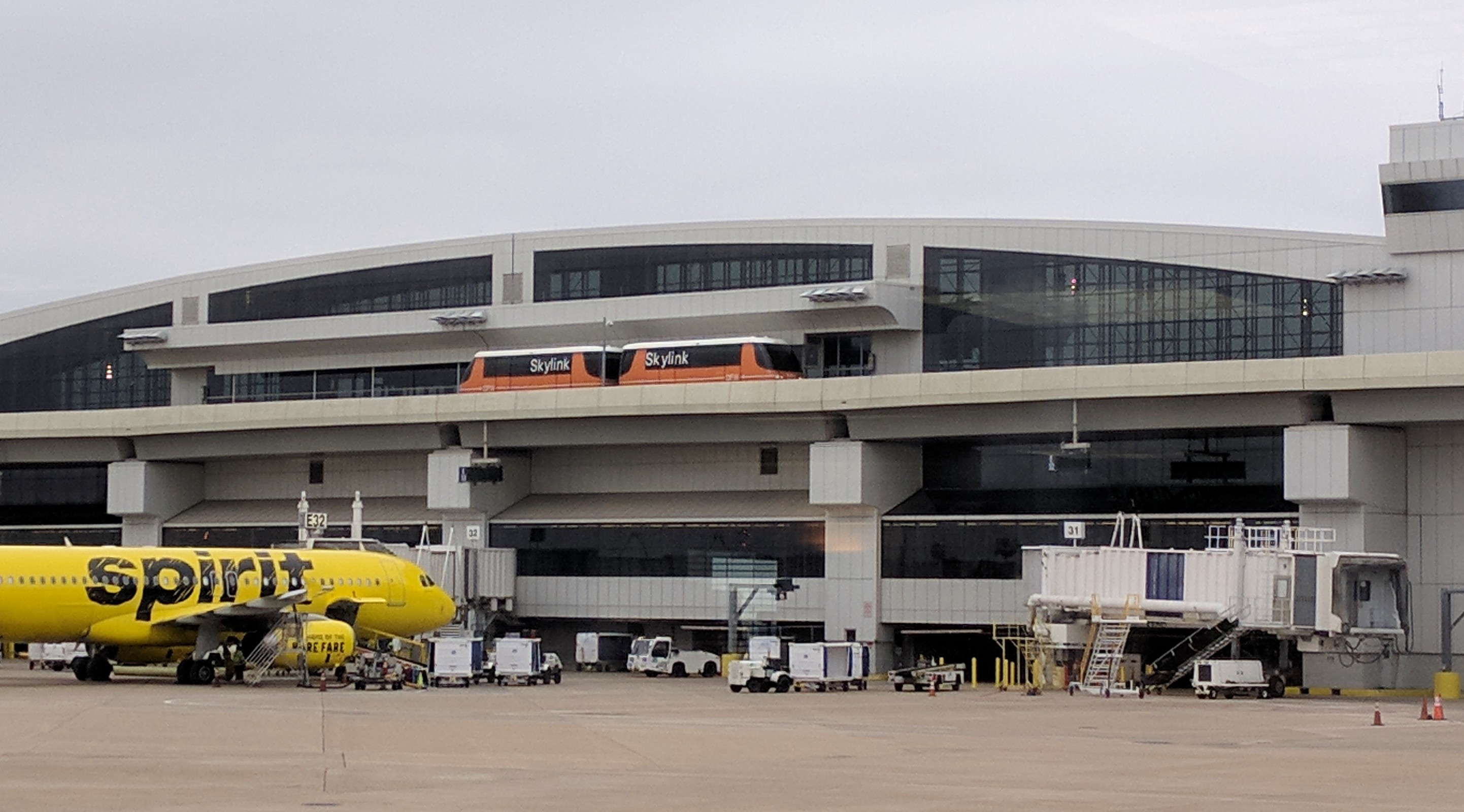
A Skylink train stopped at Terminal E adjacent to a Spirit Airlines Airbus A320

The airport facilities are spread across four cities with about 8,000 acres (3,200 ha) in Grapevine, almost 6,000 acres (2,400 ha) in Irving, around 3,000 acres (1,200 ha) in Euless, and 266 acres (108 ha) in Coppell.

=== Terminals ===
Dallas/Fort Worth International Airport has six terminals with 224 total gates; these terminals are in the City of Grapevine. The terminals are designed in a half-circle layout to minimize the distance between parking and aircraft and reduce traffic on main airport roads. The Skylink automated people mover system connects all terminals within the secure area, with an average travel time of about seven minutes.

Each terminal at DFW is supported by a coordinated ground transportation network, including shuttles, rental car buses, sedans and limousines, and designated rideshare pick-up zones to ensure smooth passenger movement. The airport's integrated transit system also helps travelers easily reach parking areas, hotels, and regional connections without delays.

American Airlines has a presence in every terminal at DFW. Most other domestic carriers use Terminal E, while international carriers primarily operate from Terminal D.

Terminal D serves as the main international terminal, equipped with U.S. Customs and Border Protection facilities and a gate that accommodates the Airbus A380. International airlines offering nonstop service to DFW include: Air Canada, Air France, Avianca, Cathay Pacific, Emirates, EVA Air, Finnair, Iberia, Qatar Airways, Japan Airlines, Korean Air, British Airways, Lufthansa, Qantas, Turkish Airlines, Viva, Volaris, and Aeromexico. Some Canadian flights from cities with pre-clearance operate from Terminal E.

- Terminal A has 36 gates.
- Terminal B has 45 gates (35 in the main terminal and 10 in a satellite building).
- Terminal C has 38 gates.
- Terminal D has 33 gates.
- Terminal E has 41 gates (26 in the main terminal and 15 in a satellite building).
- Terminal F will have 31 gates and is under construction

=== Hotels ===
The Hyatt Regency DFW International Airport was built in 1978 as the east wing of the Airport Marina Hotel. It originally had an identical twin west wing, located on the opposite side of International Parkway, which was built in 1974 and demolished for construction of Terminal D. It has 811 rooms, 92,000 square feet (8,500 m^{2}) of meeting space and four food and beverage outlets. The hotel is located adjacent to Terminal C, with shuttle buses connecting to all terminals.

The Grand Hyatt DFW opened on July 1, 2005 and has 298 rooms, 34,000 square feet (3,200 m^{2}) of meeting space and three food and beverage outlets. The hotel is located directly above Terminal D, with direct access to the check-in area.

Another Hyatt-branded hotel, Hyatt Place, is on the south side of the airport, near the airport headquarters and the rental car hub complex.

=== Ground transportation ===
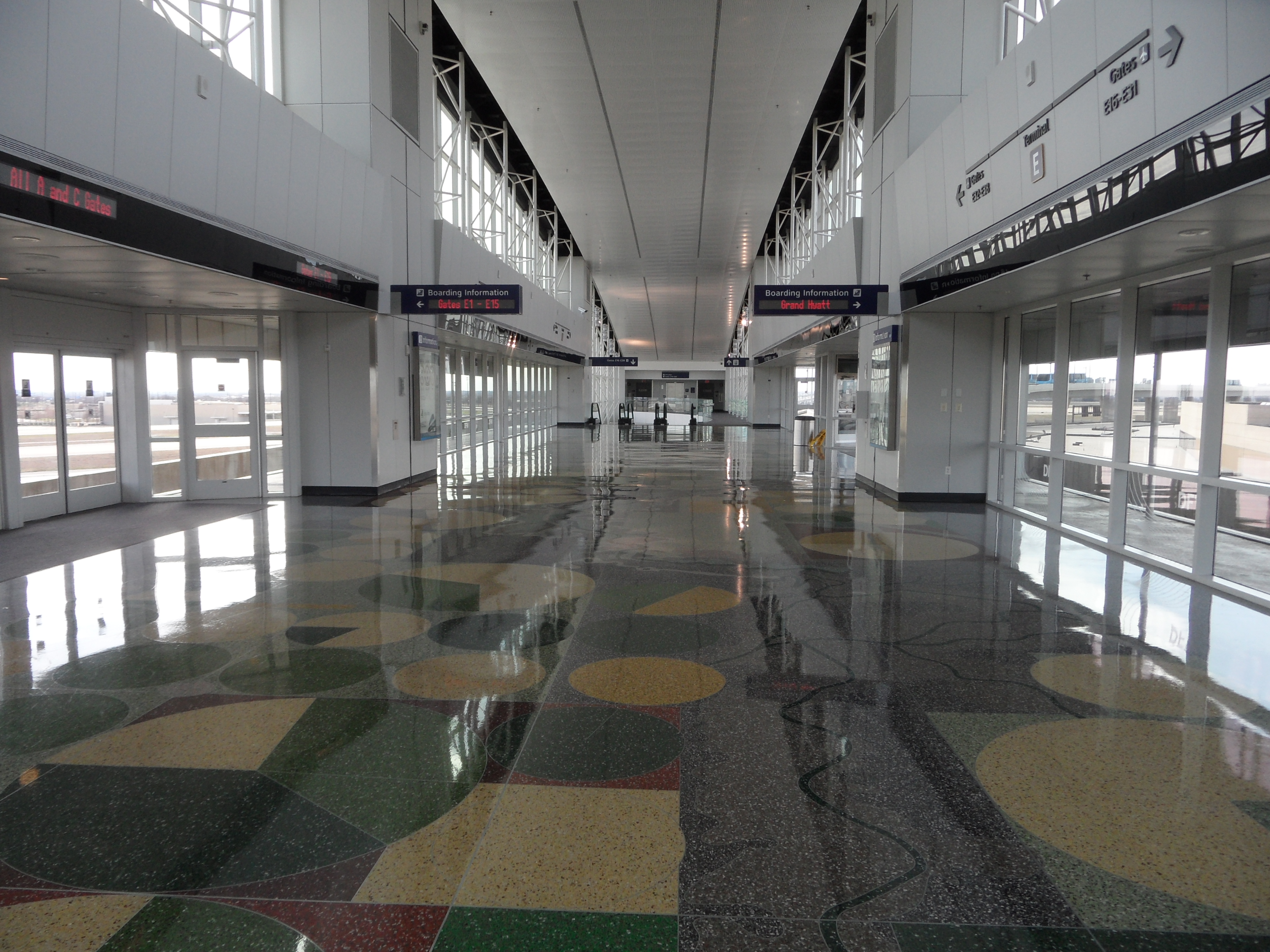
Skylink stations provide post-security transportation between terminals.

The DFW Airport area is served by International Parkway (State Highway 97 Spur), a toll road running through the center of the airport and connecting to Texas State Highway 183 (Airport Freeway) to the south and Texas State Highway 114 (John W. Carpenter Freeway) to the north. North of SH 114, International Parkway becomes Texas State Highway 121, continuing north to Interstate 635 (Lyndon B. Johnson Freeway) and the Sam Rayburn Tollway.

Public transit service is provided by Dallas Area Rapid Transit (DART) and Trinity Metro. The airport is served by three rail systems: DART rail, TEXRail, and the Trinity Railway Express. DART operates the Orange Line from DFW Airport Terminal A station to Dallas and Las Colinas, and the Silver Line from DFW Airport Terminal B station to the northern suburbs of Dallas. TEXRail operates between DFW Airport Terminal B station and T&P Station in downtown Fort Worth. The Trinity Railway Express serves CentrePort/DFW Airport station, with shuttle connections to the airport, and links downtown Dallas and Fort Worth.

Bus service supplements rail connections. Trinity Metro operates the TRE Link route between Terminal B and CentrePort/DFW Airport station. DART operates Route 230 between downtown Dallas and the Remote South Parking facility.

A consolidated rental car facility is located at the south end of the airport and is connected to all terminals by shuttle buses. The facility, which serves 11 rental car companies, opened in March 2000.

=== Other facilities ===
A cargo facility at 1639 West 23rd Street is located on the airport property. Tenants include China Airlines, Lufthansa Cargo, and the U.S. Fish and Wildlife Service.

The DFW Airport Department of Public Safety provides the airport with its own police, fire protection, and emergency medical services.

The DFW International Airport headquarters is located nearby at 2400 Aviation Drive.

In 1995, the airport opened Founders' Plaza, an observation park dedicated to the founders of DFW Airport. The site offered a panoramic view of the south end of the airport and hosted several significant events, including an employee memorial the day after the September 11 attacks in 2001 and the airport's 30th anniversary celebration in 2004. As part of the perimeter taxiway project, Founders' Plaza was closed in 2007 and moved to a new location surrounding a 50-foot (15 m)-tall beacon on the north side of the airport in 2008. The 6-acre (2.4 ha) plaza features a granite monument and sculpture, post-mounted binoculars, piped-in voices of air traffic controllers and shade pavilions. In 2010, a memorial honoring Delta Air Lines Flight 191 was dedicated at the plaza.

== Airlines and destinations ==
=== Passenger ===
Airlines	Destinations
Aeroméxico	Mexico City–Benito Juárez
Air Canada	Toronto–Pearson; Seasonal: Montréal–Trudeau
Air France	Paris–Charles de Gaulle
Alaska Airlines	Portland (OR), San Diego, Seattle/Tacoma; Seasonal: Anchorage (begins June 12, 2027)
American Airlines	Albuquerque, Asheville, Atlanta, Austin, Bakersfield, Baltimore, Belize City, Bogotá, Boise, Boston, Bozeman, Buffalo, Burbank, Calgary, Cancún, Cedar Rapids/Iowa City, Charleston (SC), Charlotte, Chicago–O'Hare, Cincinnati, Cleveland, Colorado Springs, Columbia (SC), Columbus–Glenn, Cozumel, Denver, Des Moines, Destin/Fort Walton Beach, Detroit, Dublin, Durango (MX), Eagle/Vail, El Paso, Fayetteville/Bentonville, Fort Lauderdale, Fort Myers, Frankfurt, Fresno, Grand Rapids, Greensboro, Greenville/Spartanburg, Guadalajara, Guatemala City, Harrisburg, Hartford, Honolulu, Houston–Intercontinental, Indianapolis, Jackson Hole, Jacksonville (FL), Kahului, Kansas City, Key West, Knoxville, Las Vegas, León/Del Bajío, Liberia (CR), Little Rock, London–Heathrow, Los Angeles, Louisville, Lubbock, Madison, Madrid, Mazatlán, McAllen, Memphis, Mérida, Mexico City–Benito Juárez, Miami, Milwaukee, Minneapolis/St. Paul, Missoula, Montego Bay, Monterey (CA), Monterrey (MX), Montréal-Trudeau, Montrose, Morelia, Myrtle Beach, Nashville, New Orleans, New York–JFK, New York–LaGuardia, Newark, Norfolk, Oaxaca, Oklahoma City, Omaha, Ontario, Orange County, Orlando, Palm Springs, Paris–Charles de Gaulle, Pensacola, Philadelphia, Phoenix–Sky Harbor, Pittsburgh, Portland (OR), Puerto Vallarta, Punta Cana, Querétaro, Raleigh/Durham, Reno/Tahoe, Richmond, Roatan, Rome–Fiumicino, Sacramento, St. Louis, St. Thomas, Salt Lake City, San Antonio, San Diego, San Francisco, San Jose (CA), San José (CR), San José del Cabo, San Juan, San Luis Obispo, San Luis Potosí, San Salvador, Santa Barbara, São Paulo–Guarulhos, Sarasota, Savannah, Seattle/Tacoma, Seoul–Incheon, Shanghai–Pudong, Sioux Falls, Spokane, Syracuse, Tampa, Tegucigalpa/Comayagua, Tokyo–Haneda, Tokyo–Narita, Toronto–Pearson, Tucson, Tulsa, Tulum, Vancouver, Washington–Dulles, Washington–National, West Palm Beach, Wilmington (NC); Seasonal: Amarillo, Amsterdam, Anchorage, Aruba, Athens, Auckland, Barcelona, Birmingham (AL), Brisbane, Buenos Aires–Ezeiza, Durango (CO), Flagstaff, Glacier Park/Kalispell, Grand Cayman, Gunnison/Crested Butte, Hayden/Steamboat Springs, Huntsville, Kailua-Kona, Lexington, Nassau, Panama City (FL), Portland (ME), Providenciales, Rio de Janeiro–Galeão, Santa Rosa, Santiago de Chile, Traverse City, Venice, Wichita, Zurich
American Eagle	Abilene, Aguascalientes, Albuquerque, Alexandria (LA), Amarillo, Appleton, Asheville, Aspen, Augusta (GA), Austin, Baton Rouge, Beaumont, Billings, Birmingham (AL), Bismarck, Bloomington/Normal, Brownsville/South Padre Island, Cedar Rapids/Iowa City, Champaign/Urbana, Chattanooga, Chihuahua, College Station, Colorado Springs, Columbia (MO), Columbia (SC), Columbus (MS), Columbus–Glenn, Corpus Christi, Dayton, Des Moines, Durango (CO), El Paso, Evansville, Fargo, Fayetteville/Bentonville, Fort Smith, Fort Wayne, Gainesville, Garden City, Grand Island, Grand Junction, Greenville/Spartanburg, Gulfport/Biloxi, Harlingen, Houston–Hobby, Houston–Intercontinental, Huntsville, Idaho Falls, Jackson (MS), Kansas City, Killeen/Fort Hood, Lafayette, Lake Charles, Laredo,Lawton, Lexington, Lincoln (NE), Little Rock, Longview, Louisville, Lubbock, Manhattan (KS), McAllen, Memphis, Midland/Odessa, Missoula, Mobile–Regional, Moline/Quad Cities, Monroe, Monterrey, Montgomery, Nashville, New Orleans, Oklahoma City, Panama City (FL), Pensacola, Peoria, Provo, Puerto Escondido, Rapid City, Roanoke, Roswell, St. George (UT), St. Louis, San Angelo, Santa Fe, Savannah, Shreveport, Sioux Falls, South Bend, Springfield/Branson, Stillwater, Tallahassee, Tampico, Texarkana, Torreón/Gómez Palacio, Tri-Cities (TN), Tulsa, Tyler, Veracruz, Waco, Wichita, Wichita Falls, Wilmington (NC), Yuma, Zacatecas; Seasonal: Acapulco, Atlanta, Bozeman, Charleston (SC), Chicago–O'Hare, Cincinnati, Destin/Fort Walton Beach, Flagstaff, Greensboro, Gunnison/Crested Butte, Huatulco, Ixtapa/Zihuatanejo, Loreto, Manzanillo, Monterey (CA), Montrose, Myrtle Beach, Omaha, Québec City, San Antonio, Toronto–Pearson
Avelo Airlines	New Haven
Avianca	Bogotá
Avianca El Salvador	San Salvador
Breeze Airways	Provo
British Airways	London–Heathrow
Cathay Pacific	Hong Kong
Contour Airlines	Cape Girardeau, Fort Leonard Wood, Kirksville, Tupelo
Delta Air Lines	Atlanta, Boston, Detroit, Los Angeles, Minneapolis/St. Paul, New York–JFK (ends January 4, 2027), New York–LaGuardia, Salt Lake City, Seattle/Tacoma
Denver Air Connection	Alamosa, Greenville (MS)
Emirates	Dubai–International
EVA Air	Taipei–Taoyuan
Finnair	Helsinki
Frontier Airlines	Atlanta, Baltimore, Cincinnati, Charlotte, Chicago–Midway, Chicago–O'Hare, Denver, Detroit, Fort Lauderdale, Fort Myers, Guatemala City, Indianapolis, Las Vegas, Los Angeles, Miami, Minneapolis/St. Paul, Nashville, New Orleans, Newark, New York–LaGuardia, Orange County, Orlando, Philadelphia, Phoenix–Sky Harbor, Raleigh/Durham, Salt Lake City, San Diego, San Francisco, San Salvador, Tampa, Tucson, Washington–Dulles; Seasonal: Cancún, Cleveland, Ontario
Iberia	Madrid
Japan Airlines	Tokyo–Haneda
JetBlue	Fort Lauderdale
Korean Air	Seoul–Incheon
Lufthansa	Frankfurt
Qantas	Melbourne, Sydney–Kingsford Smith
Qatar Airways	Doha
Royal Jordanian Airlines	Amman–Queen Alia
Southern Airways Express	Harrison/Branson, Hot Springs
Sun Country Airlines	Minneapolis/St. Paul; Seasonal: Cancún, Las Vegas, Puerto Vallarta, Punta Cana
Turkish Airlines	Istanbul
United Airlines	Chicago–O'Hare, Denver, Houston–Intercontinental, Newark, San Francisco, Washington–Dulles
United Express	Houston–Intercontinental
Viva	León/El Bajío, Monterrey, Querétaro
Volaris	Guadalajara, Mexico City–Benito Juárez, Morelia, Querétaro San Luis Potosí

=== Cargo ===
Airlines	Destinations
DHL Aviation	Cincinnati

== Statistics ==
=== Top destinations ===
Busiest domestic routes from DFW (June 2025 – May 2026)
Rank	City	Passengers	Carriers
1	Los Angeles, California	1,000,190	American, Delta, Frontier, Spirit
2	Atlanta, Georgia	962,442	American, Delta, Frontier, Spirit
3	Chicago–O'Hare, Illinois	951,316	American, Frontier, Spirit, United
4	Denver, Colorado	875,810	American, Frontier, United
5	New York–LaGuardia, New York	873,324	American, Delta, Frontier, Spirit
6	Las Vegas, Nevada	842,388	American, Frontier, Spirit
7	Phoenix–Sky Harbor, Arizona	831,828	American, Frontier
8	Orlando, Florida	807,314	American, Frontier, Spirit
9	Seattle/Tacoma, Washington	795,803	Alaska, American, Delta
10	Miami, Florida	754,431	American, Frontier, Spirit

Busiest international routes from DFW (June 2025 – May 2026)
Rank	Airport	Passengers	Carriers
1	Cancún, Mexico	518,771	American, Frontier, Spirit, Sun Country
2	London–Heathrow, United Kingdom	433,290	American, British Airways
3	Mexico City, Mexico	321,429	Aeroméxico, American, Volaris
4	San José del Cabo, Mexico	235,260	American
5	Guadalajara, Mexico	202,547	American, Volaris
6	Monterrey, Mexico	195,019	American, Viva
7	Toronto–Pearson, Canada	179,451	Air Canada, American
8	Doha, Qatar	173,239	Qatar Airways
9	Seoul–Incheon, South Korea	168,181	American, Korean Air
10	Madrid, Spain	161,371	American, Iberia

=== Airline market share ===
Largest airlines at DFW (June 2025 – May 2026)
Rank	Airline	Passengers	Share
1	American Airlines	68,021,539	82.6%
2	Frontier Airlines	3,307,176	4.0%
3	Delta Air Lines	2,656,495	3.2%
4	United Airlines	2,314,945	2.8%
5	Spirit Airlines	1,760,397	2.1%
	Other	4,337,228	5.3%

=== Annual traffic ===
Annual passenger traffic (enplaned + deplaned) at DFW, 1990–present
Year	Passengers	Year	Passengers	Year	Passengers	Year	Passengers
1990	48,308,737	2000	▲57,447,671	2010	▲54,814,952	2020	▼37,318,995
1991	▼47,641,090	2001	▼52,038,870	2011	▲55,665,292	2021	▲60,177,940
1992	▲51,288,928	2002	▼49,930,425	2012	▲56,713,313	2022	▲70,810,901
1993	▼50,861,279	2003	▲50,699,134	2013	▲58,579,358	2023	▲78,712,883
1994	▲52,465,090	2004	▲56,868,090	2014	▲61,863,581	2024	▲85,026,433
1995	▲53,584,242	2005	▼56,818,841	2015	▲63,504,656	2025	▼82,805,733
1996	▲54,544,101	2006	▲58,067,290	2016	▼62,951,114	2026	
1997	▲55,971,480	2007	▼57,750,887	2017	▲63,961,495	2027	
1998	▲56,375,458	2008	▼54,987,783	2018	▲65,882,969	2028	
1999	▲56,772,114	2009	▼53,875,892	2019	▲71,827,436	2029	

== Accidents and incidents ==
- August 2, 1985: Delta Air Lines Flight 191, a Lockheed L-1011 on a Fort Lauderdale–Dallas/Fort Worth–Los Angeles route, crashed near the north end of runway 17L (now 17C) after encountering a severe microburst on final approach; the crash killed 8 of 11 crew members, 128 of 152 passengers on board and one person on the ground. This was the first fatal accident at or near DFW since its opening in January 1974.
- March 24, 1987: The pilot of a Metroflight Convair CV-580, registration number N73107, operating for American Eagle Airlines bound for Gregg County Airport, lost directional control during a crosswind takeoff. The left-hand wing and propeller struck the runway and the nose landing gear collapsed as the craft slid onto an adjacent taxiway; eight passengers and three crew aboard the airliner suffered minor or no injuries. The crash was attributed to the pilot's decision to disregard wind information and take off in weather conditions that exceeded the rated capabilities of the aircraft; the pilot's "overconfidence in [his/her] personal ability" was cited as a contributing factor in the accident report.
- May 21, 1988: An American Airlines McDonnell Douglas DC-10-30, registration number N136AA, operating as AA Flight 70 bound for Frankfurt Airport, overran runway 35L after warning signals prompted the flight crew to initiate a rejected takeoff. The jetliner continued to accelerate for several seconds and did not stop until it had run 1,100 feet (335 m) past the runway threshold, collapsing the nose landing gear. Two crew were seriously injured and the remaining 12 crew and 240 passengers escaped safely; the aircraft was severely damaged and was written off. Investigators attributed the overrun to a shortcoming in the design standards when the DC-10 was built; there had been no requirement to test whether worn (as opposed to new) brake pads were capable of stopping the aircraft during a rejected takeoff and eight of the ten worn pad sets failed.
- August 31, 1988: Delta Air Lines Flight 1141, a Boeing 727, bound for Salt Lake City International Airport, crashed after takeoff, killing 14 of the 108 people on board and injuring 76 others, 26 seriously. To date, this is the last and most recent fatal accident to occur near or on airport property.
- April 14, 1993: The pilot of American Airlines Flight 102, a McDonnell Douglas DC-10-30, registration number N139AA, lost directional control during a crosswind landing in rain on arrival from Honolulu International Airport. The jetliner slid off runway 17L (now 17C) and dug into deep mud, collapsing the nose landing gear and damaging the left-hand engine and wing. A fire in the left-hand wheel well was rapidly extinguished by firefighters. Two passengers suffered serious injuries while using the evacuation slides; the remaining 187 passengers and 13 crew evacuated safely. The aircraft was written off.
- October 1, 1993: Martinaire Flight 639, a Cessna 208B Caravan cargo aircraft, registration number N9762B, was blown off runway 17L by jet blast after arriving from Tulsa International Airport, sustaining substantial damage to the left wing. The pilot, who was the sole occupant, was not injured. The pilot had disregarded a safety advisory from air traffic control and attempted to taxi behind a McDonnell Douglas MD-11 as it was cleared for takeoff.
- May 23, 2001: The right main landing gear of an American Airlines Fokker 100, registration number N1419D, operating as AA Flight 1107, collapsed upon landing on runway 17C after a scheduled flight from Charlotte/Douglas International Airport. The pilot was able to maintain directional control and stop the aircraft on the runway. The incident was attributed to metal fatigue caused by a manufacturing flaw in the right main gear; there were no serious injuries to the 88 passengers or 4 crew, but the aircraft was badly damaged and was written off.

== See also ==
- List of airports with triple takeoff/landing capability
- List of busiest airports by passenger traffic
- Transportation in Dallas
