= Paul Dennis Reid =

American robber and murderer (1957–2013)

- Mugshot
- Born: Paul Dennis Reid, Jr. November 12, 1957; Richland Hills, Texas, U.S.
- Died: November 1, 2013 (aged 55); Nashville, Tennessee, U.S.
- Other names: "The Fast Food Killer"; Justin Parks
- Conviction: First degree murder (7 counts)
- Penalty: Death

Details
- Victims: 7 killed; 1 survivor
- Span of crimes: February 16 – April 23, 1997
- Country: United States
- State: Tennessee
- Date apprehended: June 25, 1997

Paul Dennis Reid Jr. (November 12, 1957 – November 1, 2013), known as The Fast Food Killer, was an American robber and murderer who was convicted and sentenced to death for seven murders during three fast-food restaurant robberies in Metropolitan Nashville, Tennessee and Clarksville, Tennessee between the months of February and April 1997.

== Early life ==
Originally from Richland Hills, Texas, a suburb of Fort Worth, Reid went to Nashville to pursue a career as a country music singer.

At the time of the murders, Reid was on parole from a 1983 conviction in Texas on charges relating to the aggravated armed robbery of a Houston steakhouse. He had served 7 years of a 20-year sentence, and was paroled in 1990. The day before committing his first murders, Reid was fired from a Shoney's steakhouse.

== Crimes ==
=== Captain D's ===
On the morning of February 16, 1997, Reid entered a Captain D's on Lebanon Road in the Donelson neighborhood of Nashville, Tennessee and pretended to apply for a job. Once inside, he forced employee Sarah Jackson, 16, and the manager, Steve Hampton, 25, into the restaurant's cooler. Reid forced the two to lie face down on the floor and then shot both. Money was missing from the cash register, including a large amount of coins. Reid used the cash from this robbery as a down payment on a car two days later.

=== McDonald's ===
On the evening of March 23, 1997 at a McDonald's on Lebanon Road in the Hermitage neighborhood of Nashville (located 3.4 miles (5.5 km) northeast of the Captain D's), Reid approached four employees as they exited the store after closing. At gunpoint, he forced them back into the restaurant. Reid shot three employees to death in the storeroom: Andrea Brown, 17; Ronald Santiago, 27; and Robert A. Sewell, 23.

Reid attempted to shoot José Antonio Ramirez Gonzalez, but his weapon failed. Gonzalez took this opportunity to fight back, but Reid stabbed Gonzalez a total of 17 times. Gonzalez avoided further attacks by lying completely still and pretending to be dead. Reid then took $3,000 from the cash registers and fled. Upon hearing a door shut, Gonzalez crawled into the next room and dialed 911. When first responders arrived at the scene, Gonzalez was taken to a nearby hospital, treated, and ultimately survived. He eventually testified against Reid.

=== Baskin-Robbins ===
On the evening of April 23, 1997, Reid went to the door of a Baskin-Robbins on Wilma Rudolph Boulevard in Clarksville, Tennessee after closing and persuaded the employees to let him inside. Once inside, Reid kidnapped Angela Holmes, 21, and Michelle Mace, 16, and brought the two to Dunbar Cave State Park. Their bodies were discovered the next day. Their throats had been slashed.

== Trials ==
On June 1, 1997, Reid went to the home of Mitch Roberts, his former boss who had fired him from Shoney's months earlier. Reid confronted Roberts at gunpoint, and attempted to kidnap him. Roberts managed to escape back into his home, after which Reid fled the scene. Police arrested Reid soon afterwards and quickly identified him as the prime suspect for the fast food restaurant killings and robberies.

Reid was convicted on seven counts of first-degree murder across three trials. Jurors from West and East Tennessee were brought in and sequestered, because a judge determined that the overwhelming media coverage in Nashville would prevent the selection of an unbiased jury from Middle Tennessee.

=== Captain D's ===
In the Captain D's murders, Steve Hampton's driver's license and video rental card were found in the median of Ellington Parkway in East Nashville. Both had Reid's fingerprints on them. Reid was convicted on two counts of first-degree murder.

=== Baskin-Robbins ===
In the Baskin-Robbins murders, Reid's car was found to contain forensic evidence from the victims, as well as a gas receipt placing him near the location of the bodies on the night of the murders, in an area roughly 40 miles (64 km) from his home. Witnesses also placed a vehicle similar to Reid's vehicle in the immediate area at the time of the crime. Blood evidence from the victims was found on his shoes. He was found guilty on two counts of first-degree murder. The Clarksville trial took place in the time between the two Nashville trials.

== Sentences ==
Reid received seven death sentences for his convictions, the first two coming on April 20, 1999. Reid's execution was stayed several times in the years following, including an instance in 2003 just hours before the scheduled execution. Reid eventually waived his right to an appeal. Members of his family, along with anti-death penalty activists, claimed he was mentally handicapped and unable to make such a decision, and filed multiple motions to stay his execution. However, the Tennessee Supreme Court upheld all of Reid's sentences. Reid's case received national attention among anti-death penalty activists.

Reid resided at Tennessee's Morgan County Correctional Complex (Inmate #303893). His seven death sentences are the most ever handed down to a single person in the state of Tennessee.

His last execution date was scheduled for January 3, 2008, but was stayed on December 26, 2007, by US District Judge Todd J. Campbell, pending investigation into the constitutionality of Tennessee's lethal injection methods. The stay was part of a larger investigation, and not directly related to Reid's case.

On April 16, 2008, the U.S. Supreme Court issued an opinion in a Kentucky case upholding the legality of execution by lethal injection. The state of Tennessee immediately began appealing stays of execution to resume death penalty cases, including Reid's.

== Mental issues ==
After his arrest, Reid's family (notably his sister, Linda Martiniano) argued that he was too mentally incompetent to stand trial. Following his convictions, they argued he was not able to make sound legal decisions. Reid displayed erratic decision making, choosing to appeal some verdicts and not others, and professing his will to die as sentenced after having fought to avoid such a fate earlier in his defense. At the same time, Reid exhibited public signs of paranoia, calling his defense team "actors" and claiming he was part of a United States government mind-control project called "Scientific Technology" that monitored his every move. In cross-examinations, the prosecution attempted to counter this defense by claiming Reid was a crafty con artist using these "delusions" as a defense mechanism.

== Other crimes suspected ==
For a time, Reid was considered a prime suspect in the 1993 Brown's Chicken massacre in Palatine, Illinois due to the similar nature of the crime in relation to the two incidents in Nashville and Reid's similarity to the described suspect. However, Juan Luna and James Degorski were later convicted for these crimes and sentenced to life without parole.

Reid was reportedly also considered a suspect in the Houston-area killings of three people in a bowling alley for which Max Soffar was twice convicted.

== Death ==
Reid died at Nashville General Hospital at Meharry, on November 1, 2013, eleven days before his 56th birthday. The cause of death was from complications due to pneumonia, heart failure, and upper respiratory issues. Reid had been hospitalized for about two weeks.
