= Richland Hills, Texas =

- City
- Location of Richland Hills in Tarrant County, Texas
- Coordinates: 32°48′34″N 97°13′38″W
- Country: United States
- State: Texas
- County: Tarrant
- Incorporated: September 23, 1950

Government
  - Type: Council-Manager

Area
  - Total: 3.14 sq mi (8.13 km^{2})
  - Land: 3.14 sq mi (8.12 km^{2})
  - Water: 0.0039 sq mi (0.01 km^{2})
- Elevation: 554 ft (169 m)

Population (2020)
  - Total: 8,621
  - Estimate (2022): 8,407
  - Density: 2,680/sq mi (1,035/km^{2})
- Time zone: UTC–6 (Central (CST))
  - Summer (DST): UTC–5 (CDT)
- ZIP Code: 76118
- Area code: 817
- FIPS code: 48-61844
- GNIS feature ID: 2410938
- Website: richlandhills.com

Richland Hills is a city in Tarrant County, Texas, United States. The population was 8,621 at the 2020 census.

== Geography ==
Richland Hills has a total area of 3.14 square miles (8.1 km^{2}), all land.

== Demographics ==
Historical population
Census	Pop.	Note	%±
1960	7,804		—
1970	8,865		13.6%
1980	7,977		−10.0%
1990	7,978		0.0%
2000	8,132		1.9%
2010	7,801		−4.1%
2020	8,621		10.5%
2022 (est.)	8,407		−2.5%
U.S. Decennial Census; 2020 Census

=== 2020 census ===
As of the 2020 census, there were 8,621 people, 3,247 households, and 2,184 families residing in the city. The median age was 40.2 years, 21.3% of residents were under the age of 18, and 19.1% of residents were 65 years of age or older. For every 100 females there were 94.6 males, and for every 100 females age 18 and over there were 92.1 males age 18 and over.

100.0% of residents lived in urban areas, while 0.0% lived in rural areas.

There were 3,247 households in Richland Hills, of which 29.4% had children under the age of 18 living in them. Of all households, 46.0% were married-couple households, 18.5% were households with a male householder and no spouse or partner present, and 29.0% were households with a female householder and no spouse or partner present. About 26.7% of all households were made up of individuals and 13.9% had someone living alone who was 65 years of age or older.

There were 3,441 housing units, of which 5.6% were vacant. The homeowner vacancy rate was 1.6% and the rental vacancy rate was 6.2%.

Racial composition as of the 2020 census
Race	Number	Percent
White	5,647	65.5%
Black or African American	520	6.0%
American Indian and Alaska Native	108	1.3%
Asian	166	1.9%
Native Hawaiian and Other Pacific Islander	45	0.5%
Some other race	901	10.5%
Two or more races	1,234	14.3%
Hispanic or Latino (of any race)	2,365	27.4%

== Arts and culture ==
Richland Hills is listed with the Texas Historical Commission as being a City on the Texas Lakes Trail.

There are no shopping malls in Richland Hills, however a regional complex, North East Mall in Hurst, Texas, serves most of the Mid-Cities and Northeastern Tarrant County.

== Parks and recreation ==
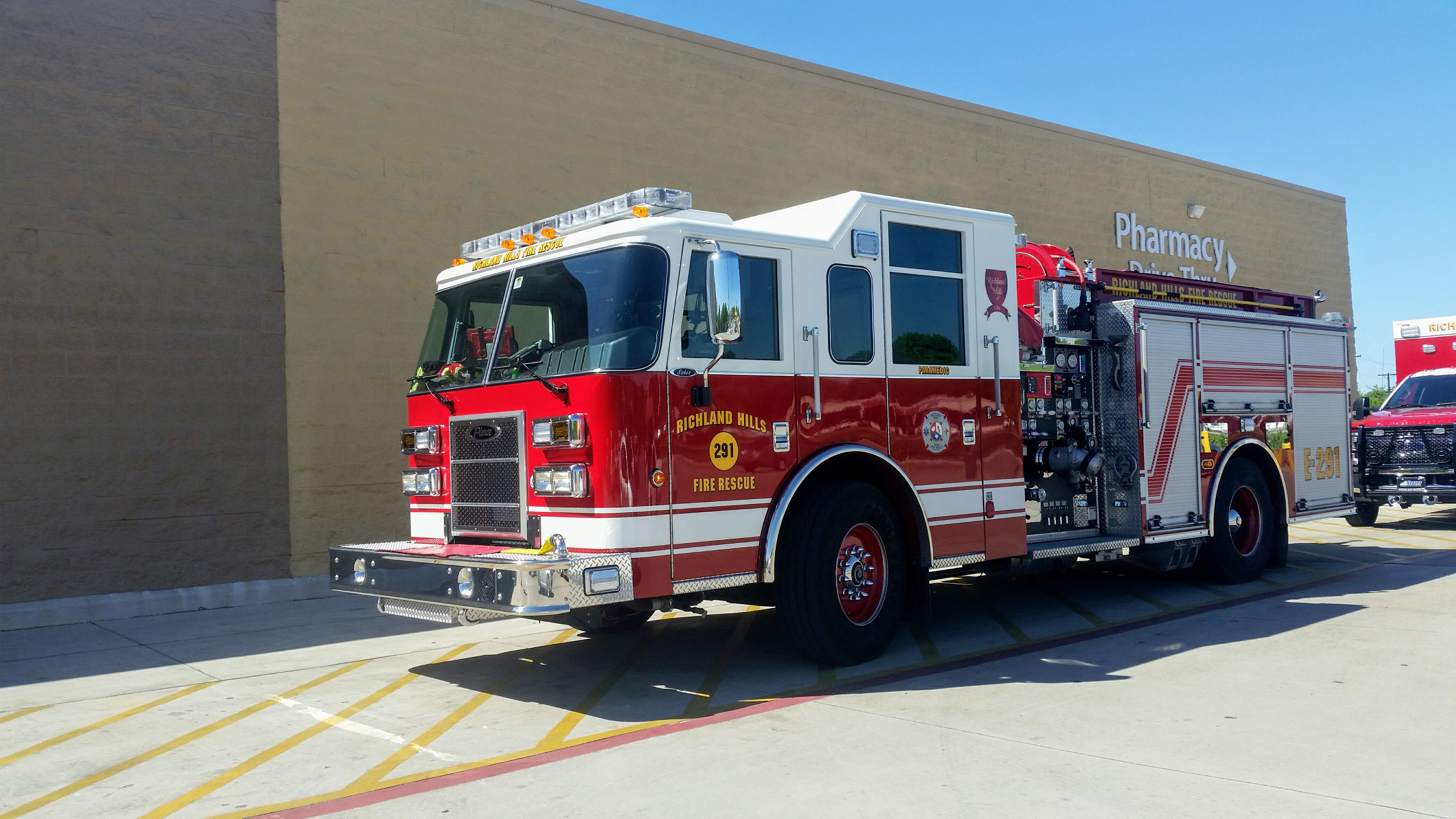
Richland Hills Fire Rescue Engine 291

Parks in Richland Hills include:

- Link Plaza, which features a water feature, pavilion and The Link Event and Recreation Center.
- Kate Baker Park
- Rosebud Park
- Creek Trail Park
- Windmill Park

== Government ==
Richland Hills operates under a charter adopted in 1986, which provides for a "Council-Manager" form of government. The Council is composed of a Mayor and six Council Members elected at large. The Council determines the overall goals and objectives for the city, establishes policies and adopts the city's annual operating budget. Richland Hills is a member of the North Central Texas Council of Governments association.

== Education ==
The city of Richland Hills is served by the Birdville Independent School District.

== Infrastructure ==
=== Transportation ===
==== Roads ====
Three state highways pass through Richland Hills:

- Texas State Highway 183 (Baker Boulevard)
- Texas State Highway 121 (Airport Freeway)
- Texas State Highway 26 (Boulevard 26 / Grapevine Highway)

==== Public transportation ====
On November 8, 2016, the city of Richland Hills withdrew from the Fort Worth Transportation Authority (FWTA), ceasing bus and paratransit operations offered by FWTA in the city.

In its lieu, the city provides residential transportation services to seniors and mobility impaired passengers through a third-party provider.

On February 17, 2024, Richland Hills station on the Trinity Railway Express commuter rail closed.

== Notable people ==
- Boyd Bartley (1920–2012), baseball player; died in Richland Hills
- Paul Dennis Reid (1957–2013), serial killer; born in Richland Hills
