= Bell station (TRE) =

Commuter rail station in Fort Worth, Texas

Bell
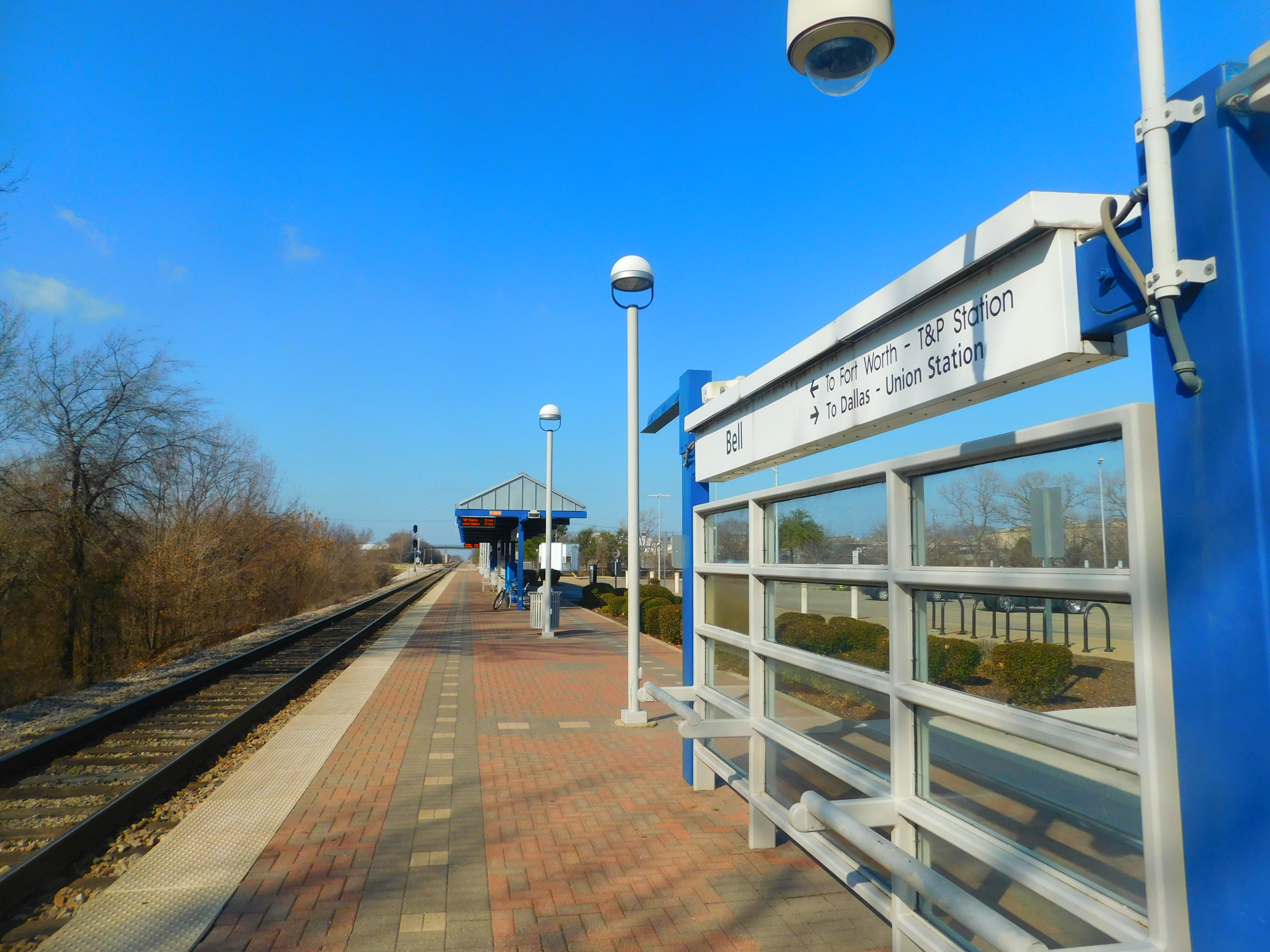
- The station at Bell in February 2017.

General information
- Location: 3232 Bell Spur Drive; Hurst, Texas 76053
- Coordinates: 32.8046°N 97.1551°W
- Owner: DART and Trinity Metro
- Line: Trinity Railway Express
- Platforms: 1 side platform
- Tracks: 1

Construction
- Structure type: At-grade
- Parking: 407 spaces
- Cycle facilities: 1 bike rack
- Accessible: Yes

Other information
- Fare zone: West

History
- Opened: September 16, 2000

Passengers
- FY 2025: 267 (avg. weekday) ▼1.8%

Services
Preceding station	Trinity Railway Express	Following station
Trinity Lakes toward T&P Station	Trinity Railway Express	CentrePort/DFW Airport toward Dallas Union Station
Location

Bell station (formerly Hurst/Bell station) is a Trinity Railway Express commuter rail station in Fort Worth, Texas. The station is located near Fort Worth's border with Hurst, 1/4 mile (0.40 km) south of Hurst Boulevard (SH 10).

The station serves the headquarters and main plant of aerospace manufacturer Bell Textron. Trinity Metro previously operated an employee shuttle to two additional Bell Textron facilities in the area, which was discontinued in 2022. The station, alongside CentrePort/DFW Airport, is also a transfer point for HEB Transit, a paratransit service for the cities of Hurst, Euless, and Bedford.

As of the 2025 fiscal year, the station has the lowest ridership of all TRE stations in Tarrant County.

== History ==
Hurst/Bell station was part of TRE's first expansion alongside CentrePort/DFW Airport and Richland Hills. The station's opening ceremony was held on Saturday, September 16, 2000. The station entered regular service the following Monday. Rides on the train were free until September 30.

Due to the station's proximity to the city limits, Hurst agreed to contribute $145,000 to TRE annually for the first five years of operation.
