= Trinity Railway Express =

Commuter rail service in the Dallas/Fort Worth area, Texas

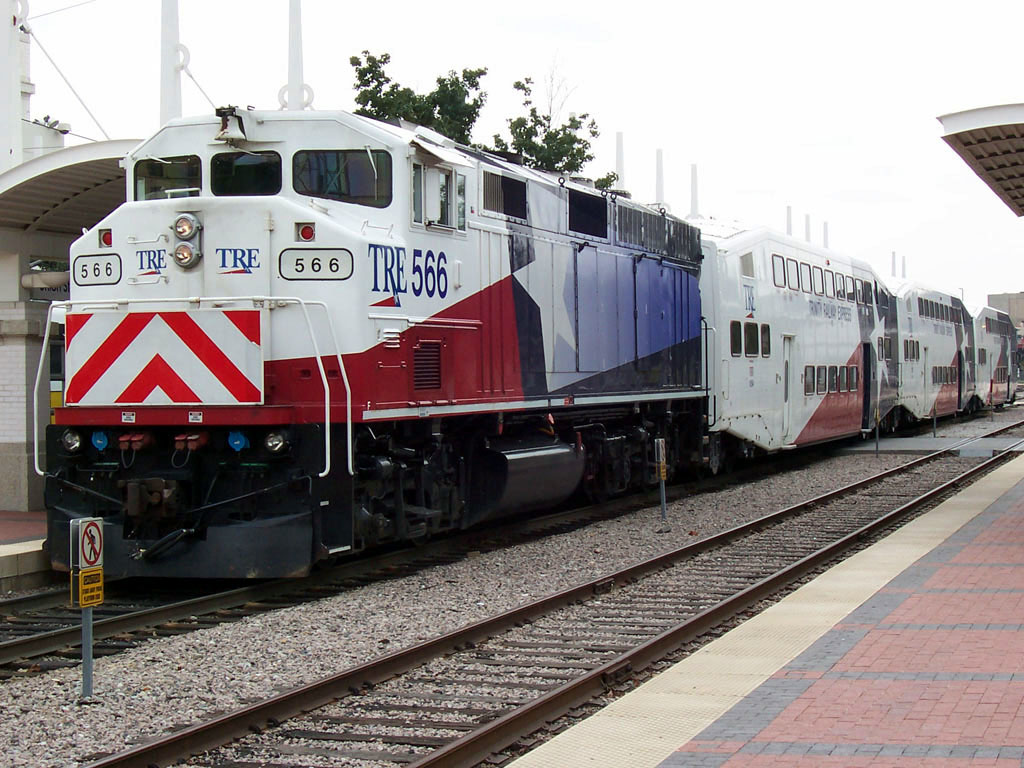
- EMD F59PH at Dallas Union Station in November 2004

Overview
- Owner: Dallas Area Rapid Transit (50%); Trinity Metro (50%)
- Locale: Dallas–Fort Worth metroplex
- Termini: Union Station, Dallas; T&P Station, Fort Worth
- Stations: 10
- Website: trinityrailwayexpress.org

Service
- Type: Commuter rail
- Operator: Herzog Transit Services
- Daily ridership: 6,700 (weekdays, Q2 2026)
- Ridership: 1,337,600 (2025)

History
- Opened: December 30, 1996; 29 years ago

Technical
- Line length: 34 mi (55 km)
- Track gauge: 4 ft 8 1/2 in (1,435 mm) standard gauge
Route map
Trinity Railway Express highlighted in blue

The Trinity Railway Express (TRE; reporting mark TRWX) is a commuter rail service in the Dallas–Fort Worth metroplex, Texas, United States. It was established by an interlocal agreement between Dallas Area Rapid Transit (DART) and Trinity Metro. Each transit authority owns a 50% stake in the joint rail project and contractor Herzog Transit Services operates the line. The TRE began operating in December 1996.

In 2025, the system had a ridership of 1,337,600, or about 6,700 per weekday as of the second quarter of 2026, making it the seventeenth most-ridden commuter rail system in the United States.

Before 2006, the TRE was typically shown as a green line on DART maps and therefore was sometimes referred to as the "Green Line," but this was not an official designation. In 2006, DART chose green as the color for its new light rail route, the Green Line. Since 2006, the TRE has been shown as a dark blue line on DART maps.

== History ==
Named after the Trinity River, the West Fork of which flows from Fort Worth to Dallas, the TRE was launched on December 30, 1996, shortly after the inaugural service of Dallas' DART rail system, operating from Dallas Union Transit Station to the South Irving Transit Station. It runs along a former Chicago, Rock Island & Pacific Railroad line that the cities of Dallas and Fort Worth purchased in 1983 for $34 million.

Service initially operated only in weekday rush hours, but midday and evening service was added in December 1997, and Saturday service was added in December 1998.

On September 18, 2000, the line was extended to the suburb of Richland Hills and, for the first time, there was rail service available between downtown Dallas and Dallas/Fort Worth International Airport. On November 13, 2000, the West Irving Transit Station also opened. On December 3, 2001, the TRE was extended to its current terminus at the T&P Station in downtown Fort Worth. On February 17, 2024, Richland Hills station was closed, being replaced by Trinity Lakes station, which opened on February 19, 2024.

TRE has leased one locomotive, three coach cars and two cab car from Minneapolis' defunct Northstar Line for the duration of the 2026 FIFA World Cup for increased service.

== Route ==
The eastern terminus of the TRE route is Dallas Union Station on the west side of downtown Dallas. From there, the line runs northwest parallel to Interstate 35E, passing American Airlines Center and Dallas Market Center before turning west. The line crosses the Elm Fork of the Trinity River into Irving, passing through Irving's historic downtown district. The train continues west to the Dallas County/Tarrant County border, passing under the President George Bush Turnpike.

While crossing into Tarrant County, the line passes about four miles south of Dallas/Fort Worth International Airport. The line passes over SH-360 and takes a slight southwest turn along the northern city limits of Arlington. It turns slightly northwest towards Bell before following the southern city limits of Hurst. As it approaches Interstate 820, it takes a sharper southwest turn towards downtown Fort Worth, passing through Richland Hills and Haltom City. The line enters downtown Fort Worth from the northeast, passing under Interstate 35W and curving towards Fort Worth Central Station. Finally, the track curls around downtown Fort Worth towards T&P Station.

According to current TRE schedules, a one-way trip in either direction takes approximately 1 hour and 2 minutes.

== Service ==
TRE provides service six days a week from 4 AM (5 AM on Saturdays) to midnight (1 AM on Fridays). Trains are scheduled to arrive once every hour, or once every half-hour on weekdays during peak periods (4 to 9 AM and 2 to 7 PM). TRE does not provide service on Sundays except during the State Fair of Texas, in which case a Saturday schedule is used.

The TRE service yard is located in Irving between West Irving and CentrePort/DFW. During the start and end of both service time and peak periods, some trains will start or end at one of these stations.

=== TRE Link ===
Because TRE passes south of Dallas/Fort Worth International Airport, the airport is serviced via a shuttle bus that runs between CentrePort/DFW and the airport's Terminal B. The Terminal B stop provides a connection to TEXRail via a pedestrian path. Branded as TRE Link and operated by Trinity Metro, the shuttle runs every 20–40 minutes during TRE operating hours.

== Rolling Stock ==
| Class | Image | Type(s) | Top speed | | Number | Built |
| Class | Image | Type(s) | mph | km/h | Number | Built |
|---|---|---|---|---|---|---|
| EMD F40PH | | Diesel Locomotive | 110 | 177 | 2 | 1981–1985 |
| EMD F59PH | | Diesel Locomotive | 110 | 177 | 7 | 1988–1994 Late 2010 (Overhaul) |
| EMD F59PHI | | Diesel Locomotive | 110 | 177 | 2 | 2001 |
| Bombardier BiLevel Coach | | Coach Car; Cab Car | 95 | 150 | 25 | 1976–77; 2003; 2007; 2009 |
Former fleet
| Budd RDC-1 | | Diesel Multiple Unit | 85 | 137 | 13 | 1954–58 |

=== Diesel locomotives ===
TRE has a fleet of 11 locomotives.

- EMD F59PH IV (1994)

There are seven EMD F59PH IV locomotives that were acquired from GO Transit. The original numbers for these were #525, #527–528 and #565–568. These were overhauled in late 2010 by the Norfolk Southern Railway and RELCO Locomotive to meet EPA standards and renumbered 120–126.

- EMD F59PHI (2001)

There are two EMD F59PHI locomotives that were purchased from EMD. The numbers for these are #569 and #570.

- EMD F40PH (2022)

TRE acquired 2 ex-Amtrak F40PHs No. 270 and 274 from Progress Rail in late 2021 and delivered in January 2022. They are numbered 130 and 131.

- Siemens SCD-42E Chargers (2026)

TRE announced an order for Siemens Charger locomotives in 2024, which are to be delivered in Mid 2026. They are slated to replace the older locomotives in the fleet.

=== Coaches ===
- Bombardier Transportation and Hawker Siddeley bi-level cabs and coaches

1000-1001 built 1983 (now coaches 1048-1049) 1002-1003 built 2003 1004-1009 built 2007

=== Former fleet ===
Until 2011, the TRE fleet included diesel multiple units, in the form of 13 Budd Rail Diesel Cars (RDCs) built in the 1950s for Canadian Pacific (9), Canadian National (3) and Boston & Maine (1). They were purchased used from Via Rail Canada in 1993. All were remanufactured by GEC-Alsthom in Montreal. They entered service in March and April 1997 – after trains leased from Amtrak and the Connecticut Department of Transportation temporarily provided initial TRE service when the RDCs were not ready in time for the inauguration of TRE service in December 1996 – and thereafter provided all service for the line's first two to three years. They remained in service for about 14 years, the last cars being taken off of TRE service in March 2011. In 2010–2011, 11 of the 13 cars were leased to Denton County Transportation Authority for operation on the A-train. They were returned in 2012 and placed in storage at the TRE shops in Irving, Texas. In spring 2017, 12 RDCs were sold via auction to AllEarth Rail, a Vermont-based private company that intends to use them to operate commuter rail service connecting the Vermont cities of Montpelier and Burlington. AllEarth subsequently resold two of the TRE cars to TriMet, of Portland, Oregon, before they had left Texas, and those two Dallas RDCs (Nos. 2007 and 2011) were moved in August 2017 from Texas to Oregon, where TriMet planned to use them on its WES Commuter Rail service. The other 10 RDCs were moved to Vermont the same month. Meanwhile, the last RDC was donated to the Museum of the American Railroad in 2023.

In preparation for the 2026 FIFA World Cup, Trinity Railway Express has leased locomotives and cars from Minneapolis' former Northstar Line, including two MotivePower MPXpress locomotives and eight Bombardier BiLevel Coaches.

=== Train consist ===
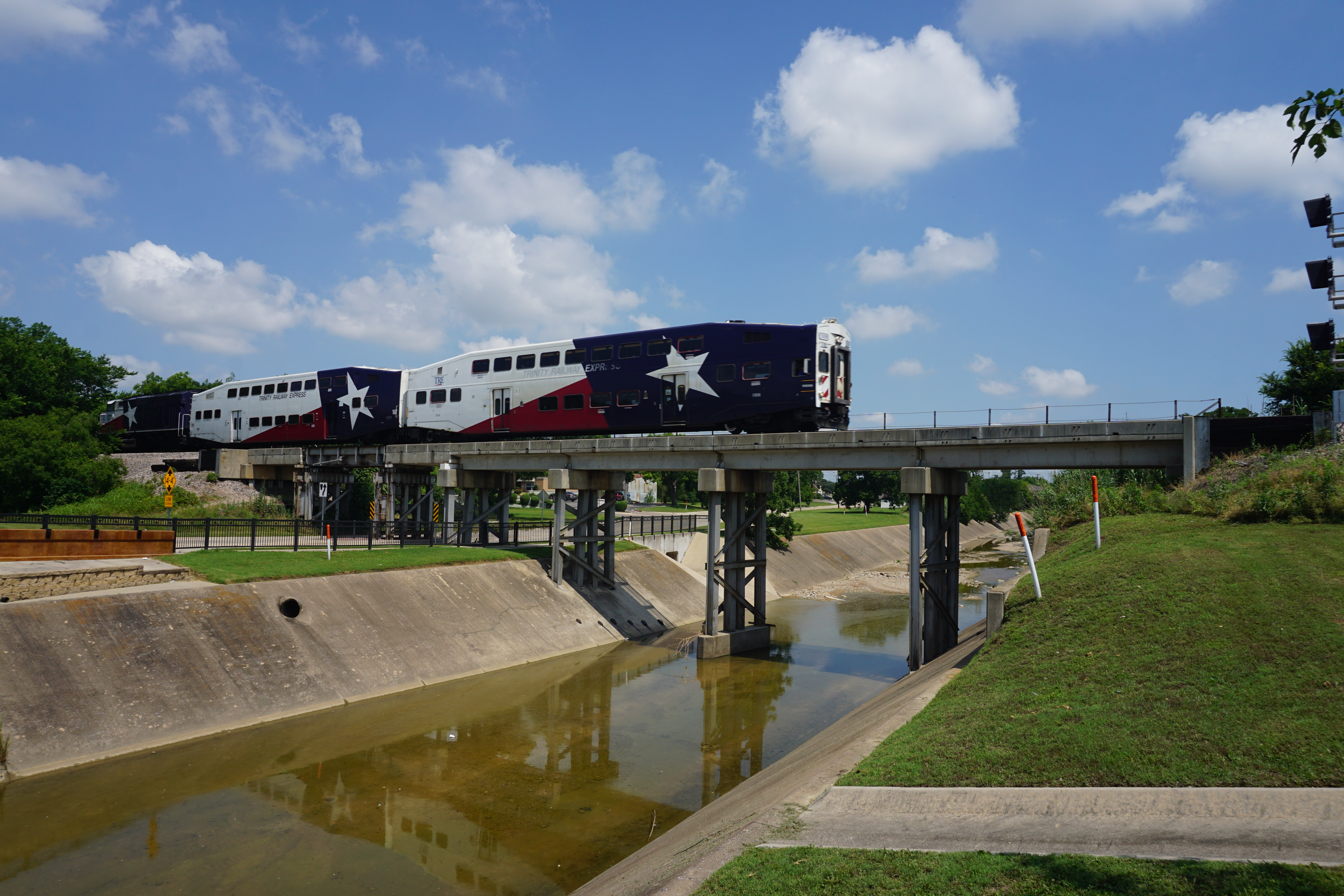
Trinity Railway Express train with Bombardier BiLevel Coaches

Each train includes at least one locomotive unit and one bi-level cab car. Typically, one or two additional coach cars are included between the locomotive and cab car. Each cab car (and thus each train) has a restroom and passengers may move between cars during the trip.

=== Travel times and proposed improvements ===
The trip from Union Station to T&P Station takes just over an hour, with scheduled trip times ranging from one hour, three minutes to one hour, eleven minutes. Track improvements are proposed, which should offer an improvement in travel times by double-tracking certain stations and sections of the route. As of 2025, portions of the route are single-track, requiring eastbound and westbound trains to meet only at certain points and requiring some eastbound trains to hold for 5–7 minutes to wait for a westbound train to get to the passing area.

== Stations ==
Stations in the West fare zone are included in Trinity Metro local fares, while stations in the East fare zone are included in DART local fares. Travel from one zone to the other requires a regional fare from either agency.

| Fare zone | Station | Parking | Municipality | Points of interest and major connections |
|---|---|---|---|---|
| West (Tarrant County) | T&P Station | | Fort Worth | Trinity Metro: TEXRail |
| West (Tarrant County) | Fort Worth Central Station (Note: Formerly Fort Worth Intermodal Transportation Center) | | Fort Worth | Serves Fort Worth Convention Center, Fort Worth Water Gardens, Sundance Square; Trinity Metro: TEXRail; Amtrak: Heartland Flyer, Texas Eagle |
| West (Tarrant County) | Trinity Lakes (Note: Replaced Richland Hills Station in 2024) | | Fort Worth | Will serve planned Trinity Lakes mixed-use transit-oriented development |
| West (Tarrant County) | Bell (Note: Formerly Hurst/Bell station) | | Hurst (Note: Bell station is located in Fort Worth but uses a Hurst postal code) | Serves Bell Textron plant |
| West/East (Note: Centreport/DFW Airport station, while located in Tarrant County, is included in both zones) | CentrePort/DFW Airport | | Fort Worth | Serves Dallas Fort Worth International Airport via TRE Link shuttle |
| East (Dallas County) | West Irving | | Irving | |
| East (Dallas County) | Downtown Irving/Heritage Crossing (Note: Formerly South Irving station) | | Irving | |
| East (Dallas County) | Medical/Market Center | | Dallas | Serves Parkland Memorial Hospital, UTSW Medical Center, Children's Medical Center, Dallas Market Center |
| East (Dallas County) | Victory | | Dallas | Serves American Airlines Center; DART rail: Green Line Orange Line |
| East (Dallas County) | Union Station | | Dallas | Serves Reunion Tower, Dealey Plaza; DART rail: Blue Line Red Line; Amtrak: Texas Eagle; Dallas Streetcar |

== Gallery ==
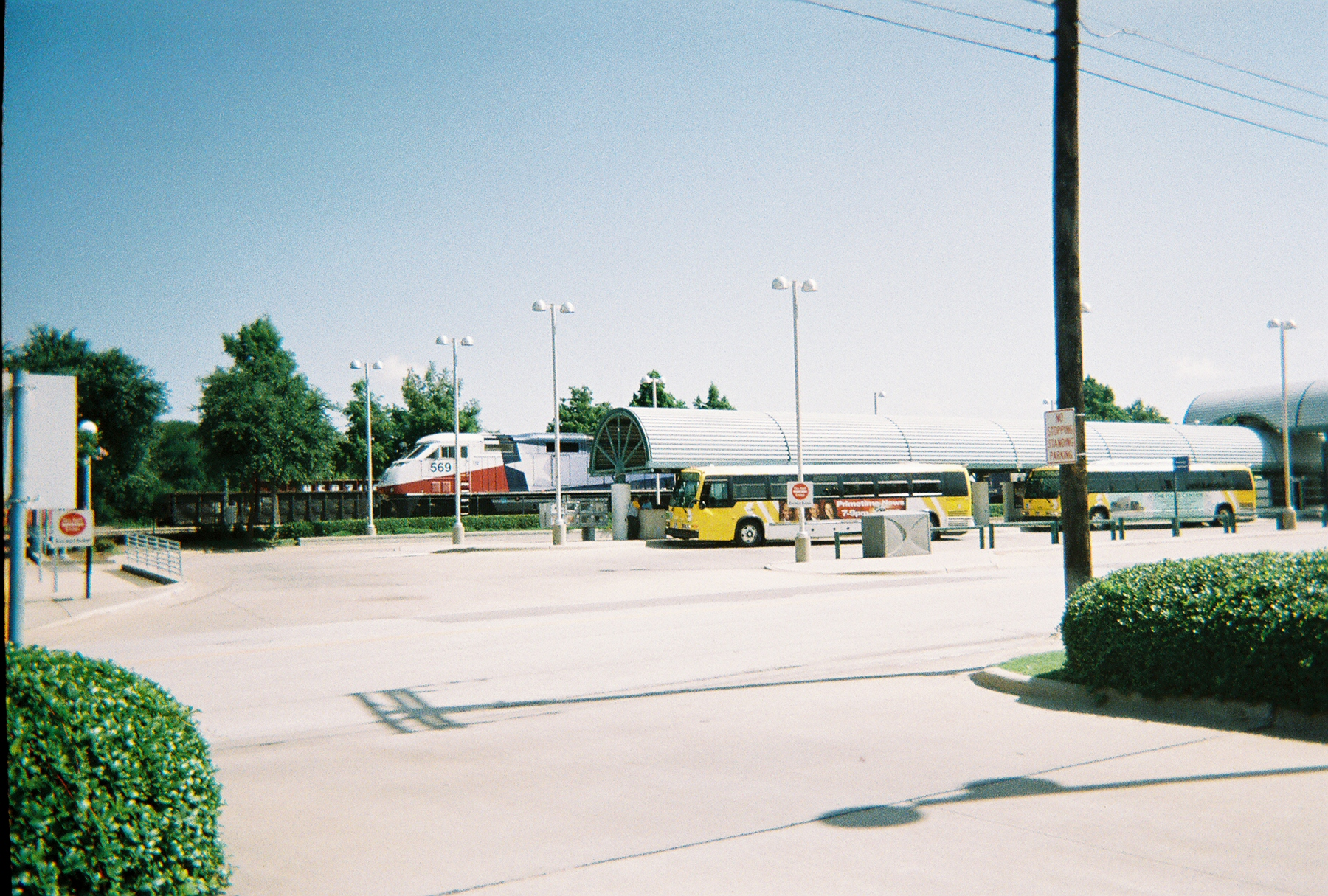
TRE train at South Irving station

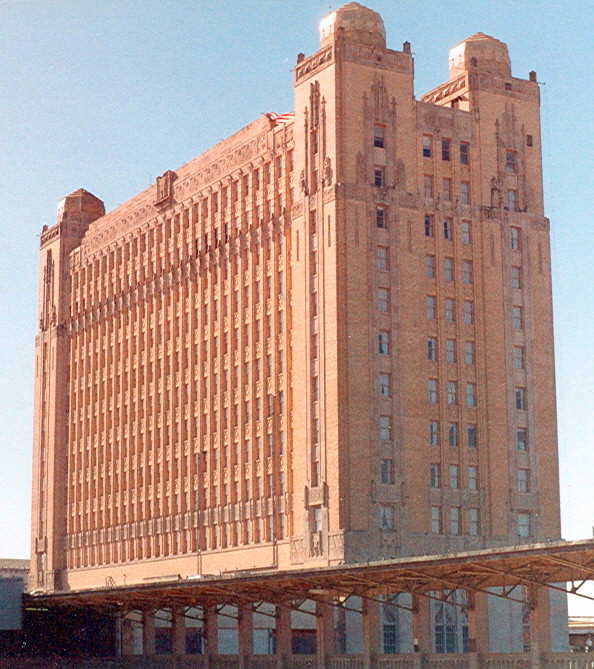
The TRE stops at the historic T&P Station in Fort Worth

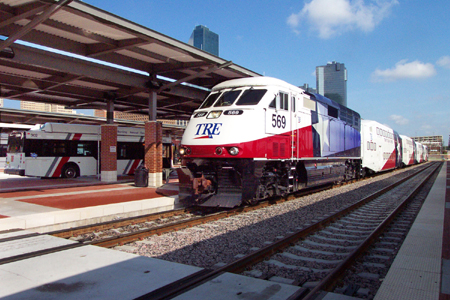
Trinity Railway Express train pulling into Fort Worth Central Station
