= Microtransit =

Form of demand-responsive transport with no fixed routes or schedules

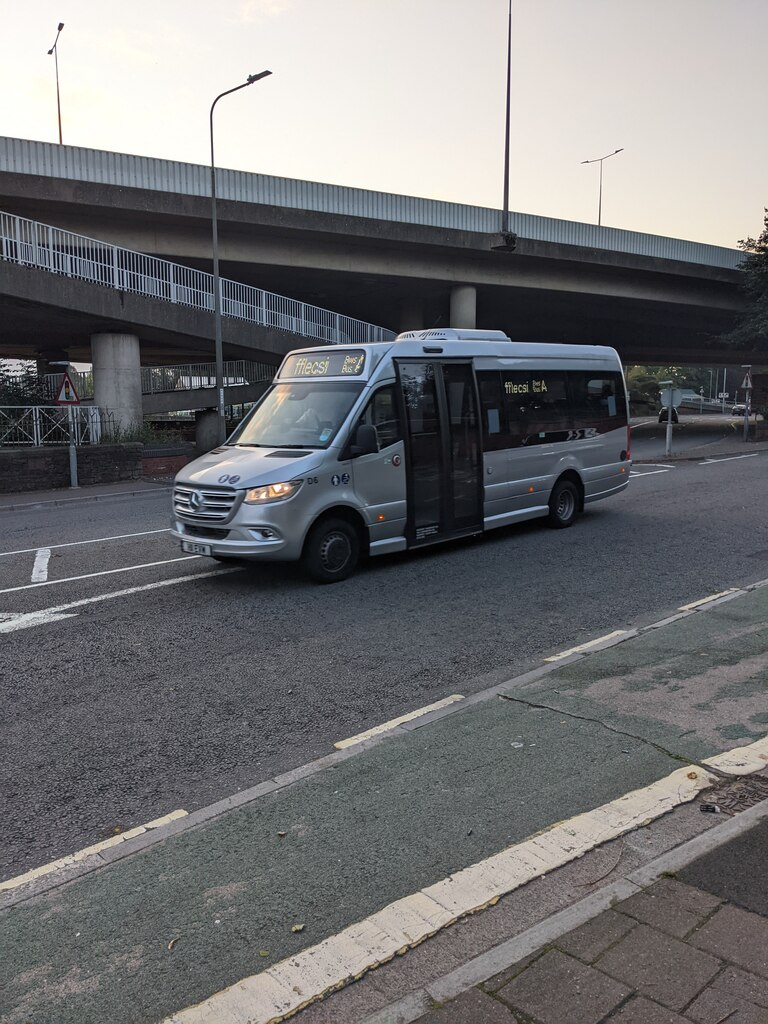
A Transport for Wales fflecsi vehicle in Newport, Wales.

Microtransit is a form of bus demand responsive transport vehicle for hire. This transit service offers a flexible routing and/or flexible scheduling of minibus vehicles shared with other passengers. Microtransit providers build routes ad-hoc exclusively to approximate demands (trips collectively) and supply (driven vehicle) and to purportedly extend the efficiency and accessibility of the transit service. Possible pick-up/drop-off stops are restricted (usually within a geofenced area), and transit can be provided as a stop-to-stop service or a curb-to-curb service.

Proponents argue that conceptually, microtransit fits somewhere between private individual transportation (cars or taxicabs or ridesharing companies) and public mass transit (bus).

Customers can request new routes based on demand. According to SAE International, "Microtransit is a privately or publicly operated, technology-enabled transit service that typically uses multi-passenger/pooled shuttles or vans to provide on-demand or fixed-schedule services with either dynamic or fixed routing". That mainly targets children and teens and customers to connect between residential areas to downtown.

== History ==
Although the share-taxi kind of transit service has been running for a while in the Southern Hemisphere and in Asia, they have involved private provision of some degree of fixed routes or fixed schedules but not always booking ability, let alone mobile booking or route optimisation. The development of mobile booking technologies has led to a wave of pilot schemes being adopted in Europe and North America.

In the United States, microtransit has evolved from jitney transport, which was once common in many cities around the world but has disappeared due to tighter regulations. In 1914, during a streetcar strike in Los Angeles, a motorist began giving rides for a jitney. Its flexible service swept the nation very quickly. Another jitney success was "dollar vans" during the eleven-day 1980 New York City transit strike.

== Development ==
Technologies allow real time exchange of booking information and programmed route optimization of the transit service. The term "microtransit" may have emerged into widespread industry discussion around 2015, when this wave of technology-enabled services was starting, and seems specific to the English language.

The current implementations result from public-private partnerships, subsidized by the government, or are brought by the private sector directly to the customer. Whether microtransit can be profitable, just like public transit, is unsure.

The success of microtransit systems depends on its configuration. Some experiences in the United States have resulted in failures.

== Application ==
The flexibility and intelligence in microtransit can be useful in cases when the demand is either geographically spread or coming at various and/or unpredictable times, i.e. when it is hard to gather demand with a planned transit service. Examples include: low-density areas, night services, and other formats adapted to specific needs.

== Autonomous electric vehicles ==
Autonomous electric vehicles are much more cost effective and efficient for microtransit service than other vehicle types. The cost effectiveness can be attributed to the elimination of a driver from the vehicle. A study conducted in Singapore mentioned that microtransit services using autonomous electric vehicles can reduce the total cost of ownership by 70% compared to other microtransit vehicles and by 80% compared to buses.
