= Ali Michael =

American model

- Born: Alexandra Nicole Michael; May 15, 1990 (age 36); Arlington, Texas, U.S
- Modeling information
- Height: 1.77 m (5 ft 9 1/2 in)
- Hair color: Brown
- Eye color: Grey
- Agency: IMG Model Management (New York, Los Angeles, London); Kim Dawson Agency (Dallas)

Alexandra Nicole Michael (born May 15, 1990 in Colleyville, Texas) is an American model.

== Early life ==
Ali Michael grew up in Colleyville, Texas. Her career began after winning the Fashion!Dallas/Kim Dawson Model Search contest in 2005 at age 15. She graduated from Grapevine High School in May 2008 and moved to New York shortly thereafter to continue her modeling career.

== Career ==
In 2006, Michael signed with DNA Models and appeared in an Italian Elle editorial. In February 2007, she made her runway debut on the fall New York runway, where she opened for 3.1 Phillip Lim and Alice Roi. She walked the fall Marc by Marc Jacobs show in London, as well as the fall Lanvin show in Paris in March. Throughout the rest of 2007, she made appearances in magazines such as W, French Revue de Modes, Harper's Bazaar, and Teen Vogue. In October, she walked the runway in Paris for Lanvin, Chanel, Christian Dior and Karl Lagerfeld.

In February 2008, she was sent home from Paris Fashion Week after being told that "her legs were too plump". Michael had gained five pounds after struggling with an eating disorder that caused her to weigh 98 lbs at 5'9". She was then the focus of the article "Wasn't Skinny Supposed to Be Out of Fashion?" in The Wall Street Journal on February 28, 2008. After being suspended from Fashion Week, in February 2008 Michael appeared on Today and openly talked about her struggle with bulimia nervosa and anorexia nervosa.

In May 2008, she appeared on the Today Show, accompanied by Amy Astler, Editor-in-Chief of Teen Vogue magazine, and talked about the increasing pressure to be thin as a model. She stated that she "hadn't had [her] period in over a year" and had a wake-up call on a plane, when, she said, "I ran my fingers through my hair, and when I took my hand away there was a dry brittle clump of hair in my hand". Michael began to see a nutritionist to deal with her weight and eating issues, including bulimia nervosa. Regarding her interview on the Today Show about her weight loss, Michael said, in the February 2009 issue of Teen Vogue, "I've had a lot of girls come up to me to say 'Thank you,' and that makes me feel good". She also said that she was not alone in her weight struggles, and that many models starve themselves. Ali subsequently returned to Texas to complete her schooling.

After her early departure from Paris after just one show, she returned in September 2008 for spring Fashion Weeks in London, Milan and Paris. She appeared on the catwalks of Lacoste, ADAM, Matthew Williamson, Marc Jacobs, Max Azria, 3.1 Phillip Lim, Doo.Ri, Paul Smith, Luella, Louise Goldin, Aquascutum, House of Holland, Burberry Prorsum, Iceberg, Fendi, Bruno Pieters, Christian Dior, Balenciaga, Sonia Rykiel, Karl Lagerfeld, Akris, Celine and John Galliano. In addition to her successful comeback, Ali continued her contract with SportMax and began a new fragrance contract with Lanvin's Jeanne Lanvin. She also became the face of the new Anna Sui's campaign, Lord and Taylor, Gianfranco Ferre, and Coach, Inc.

Skipping Fashion Week in New York, London, Milan, and Paris in 2009, she returned in September for spring Fashion Weeks in New York, London, and Paris, walking for 3.1 Phillip Lim, Burberry, Sonia Rykiel, Emanuel Ungaro, and Yohji Yamamoto.

She dated Matthew Gray Gubler, Marcel Castenmiller, and most recently Avery Tucker.

In July 2016, Michael was the Playboy Playmate of the Month. Michael appeared in The xx's November 2016 music video for their song "On Hold".

Amberleigh West	Kristy Garett	Dree Hemingway	Camille Rowe	Brook Power	Josie Canseco
Ali Michael	Valerie van der Graaf	Kelly Gale	Allie Silva	Ashley Smith	Enikő Mihalik
