= Grapevine, Texas =

- City
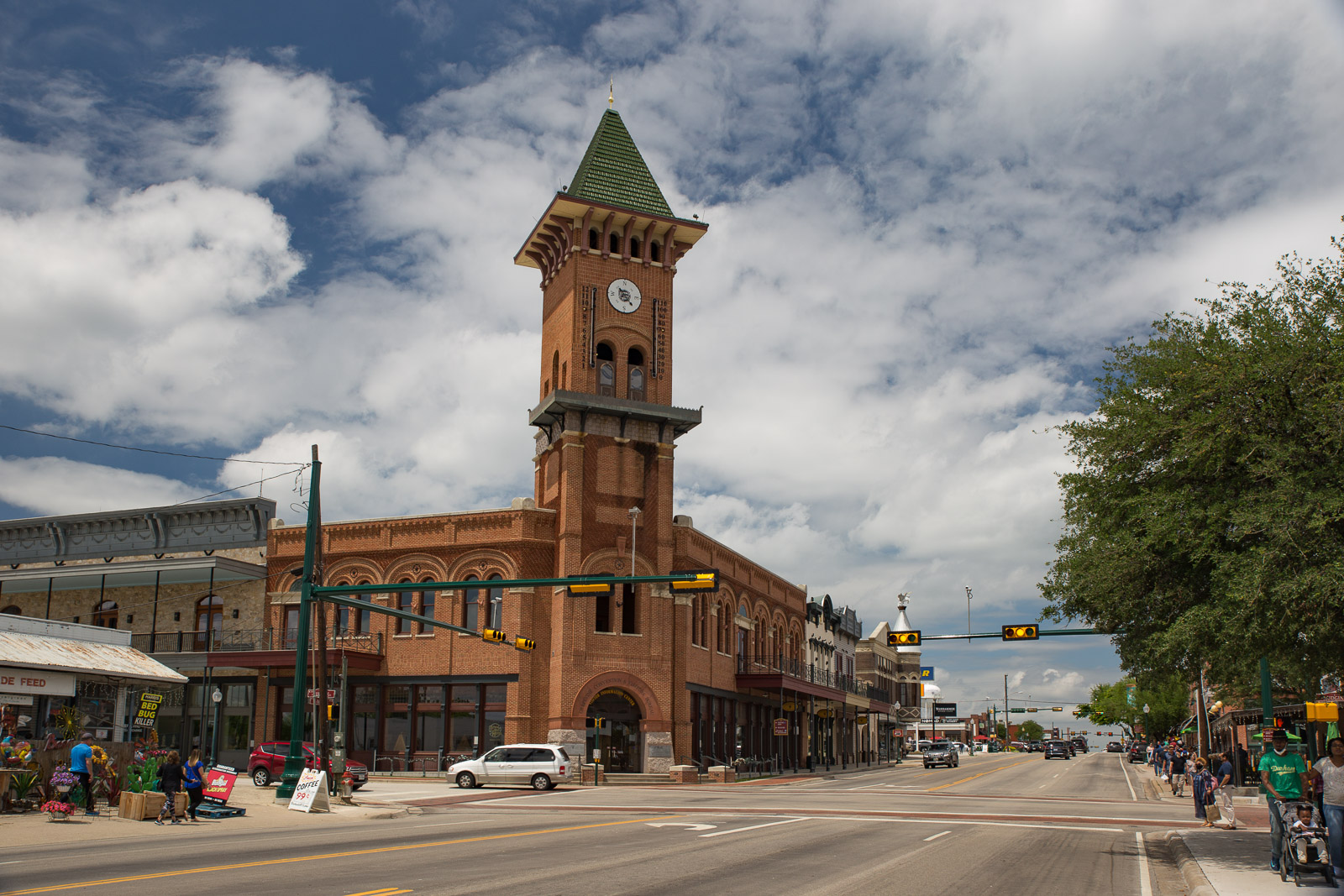
- Downtown Grapevine, Texas

- Seal

- Location of Grapevine in Tarrant County, Texas
- Coordinates: 32°56′6″N 97°5′9″W
- Country: United States
- State: Texas
- Counties: Tarrant; Dallas; Denton
- Grape Vine Prairie: 1844
- Grape Vine: 1854
- Grapevine: 1907

Government
  - Type: Council–manager

Area
  - Total: 35.78 sq mi (92.66 km^{2})
  - Land: 32.14 sq mi (83.25 km^{2})
  - Water: 3.63 sq mi (9.41 km^{2}) 9.98%
- Elevation: 630 ft (190 m)

Population (2020)
  - Total: 50,631
  - Density: 1,575.3/sq mi (608.22/km^{2})
- Time zone: UTC−6 (CST)
  - Summer (DST): UTC−5 (CDT)
- ZIP codes: 76051, 76092, 76099
- Area codes: 682, 817, 214, 469, 945, 972
- FIPS code: 48-30644
- GNIS feature ID: 2410650
- Website: grapevinetexas.gov

Grapevine is a city located in northeast Tarrant County, Texas, United States, with minor portions extending into Dallas and Denton counties. Its population was 50,631 in the 2020 census, up from 46,334 in the 2010 census. The city is located in the Mid-Cities suburban region between Dallas and Fort Worth and includes a larger portion of Dallas/Fort Worth International Airport than other cities.

The city is adjacent to Grapevine Lake, a large reservoir impounded by the Army Corps of Engineers in 1952 that serves as a source of water and a recreational area.

== History ==
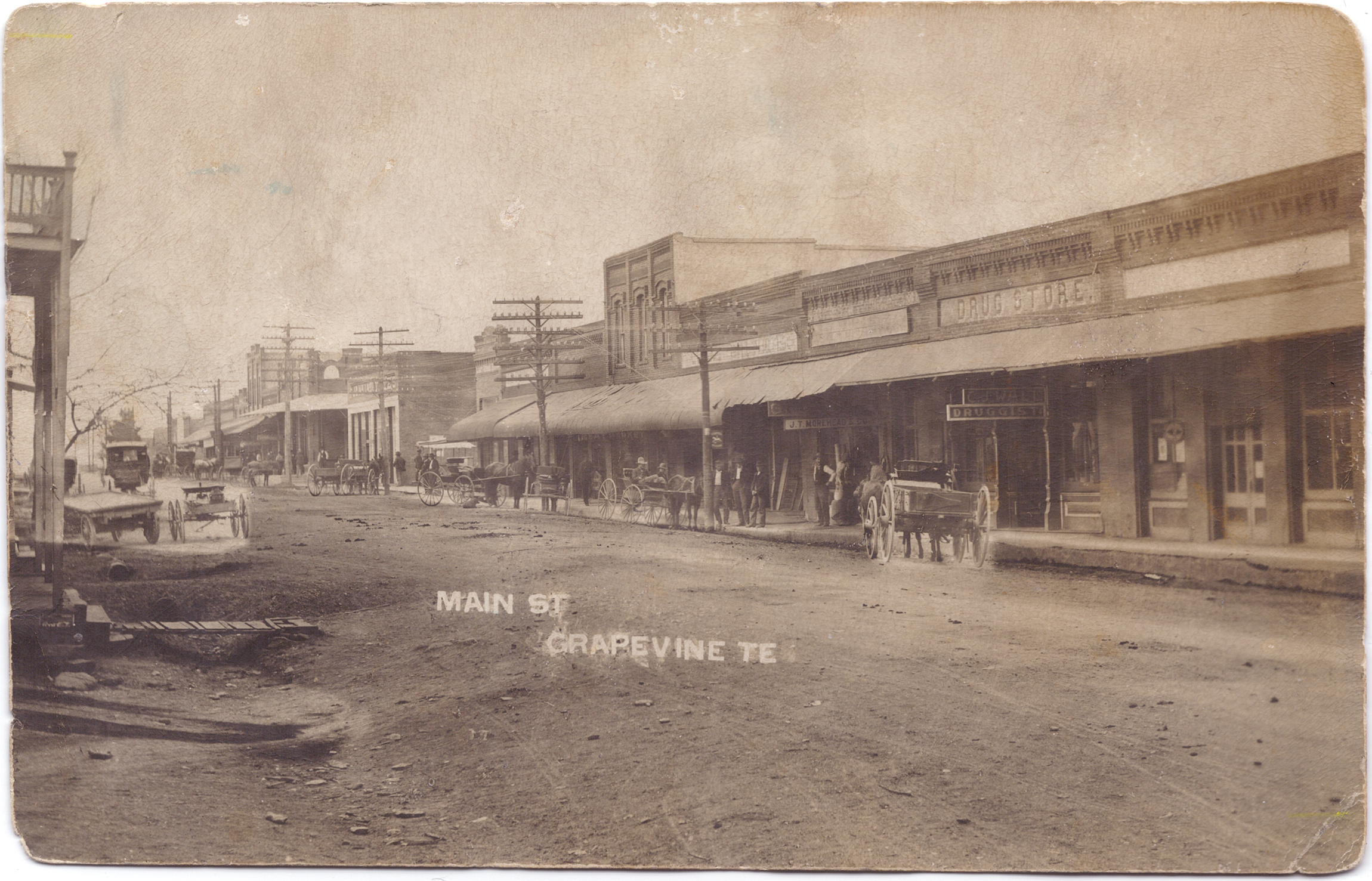
Postcard of Main Street in Grapevine, circa 1900–1908

In October 1843, General Sam Houston and fellow Republic of Texas commissioners camped at Tah-Wah-Karro Creek, also known as Grape Vine Springs, to meet with leaders of 10 Indian nations. This meeting culminated in the signing of a treaty of "peace, friendship, and commerce", which opened the area for homesteaders. The settlement that emerged was named Grape Vine due to its location on the appropriately named Grape Vine Prairie near Grape Vine Springs, both names in homage to the wild grapes that grew in the area. Grapevine is the oldest settlement in Tarrant County, established in 1844, before Texas joined the Union in 1846.

The first recorded white settlement in what would become the modern city occurred in the late 1840s and early 1850s. General Richard Montgomery Gano owned property near Grape Vine and helped organize the early settlement against Comanche raiding parties before leading his band of volunteers to battle in the American Civil War. Growth during the 19th century was slow but steady; by 1890, Grape Vine had about 800 residents supported by such amenities as a newspaper, a public school, several cotton gins, a post office, and railroad service. The settlement made continued gains early in the 20th century and on January 12, 1914, the post office altered the town's name to one word: Grapevine.

On Easter Sunday, April 1, 1934, Henry Methvin, an associate of Bonnie Parker and Clyde Barrow, killed two police officers, E.B. Wheeler and H.D. Murphy, during an altercation near Grapevine. A historical marker remains at the intersection of Dove Road and State Highway 114.

Grapevine's population fell during the interwar period, as the economy stagnated, though the city was officially incorporated in 1936. Cotton was the primary crop for Grapevine until the early 20th century, when it was overtaken by cantaloupe farms that accounted for 25,000 acres. For several decades, until the early 1970s, the Rotary Club sign outside of town boasted Grapevine as the "Cantaloupe Capital of the World". Population growth and economic gains resumed to some extent in the decades after World War II. The opening of Dallas–Fort Worth International Airport in 1974 spurred massive development. Grapevine depended heavily upon agricultural production prior to the mid-20th century, but transformed into a regional center of commerce because of its proximity to the airport's north entrance.

In recent years, several wineries have opened in Grapevine, and the city has been active in maintaining its historic downtown corridor.

== Geography ==
According to the United States Census Bureau, the city has a total area of 35.9 square miles (93 km^{2}), of which 32.3 mi^{2} (84 km^{2}) are land and 3.6 mi^{2} (9.3 km^{2}) are covered by water.

=== Climate ===
Grapevine has a humid subtropical climate (Köppen Cfa) with long, very hot summers and short, mild winters.

Climate data for Grapevine, Texas (Grapevine Dam) (1991–2020 normals, extremes 1897–present)
Month	Jan	Feb	Mar	Apr	May	Jun	Jul	Aug	Sep	Oct	Nov	Dec	Year
Record high °F (°C)	95 (35)	95 (35)	100 (38)	101 (38)	105 (41)	109 (43)	112 (44)	115 (46)	110 (43)	102 (39)	93 (34)	91 (33)	115 (46)
Mean maximum °F (°C)	76.8 (24.9)	80.5 (26.9)	86.5 (30.3)	88.7 (31.5)	93.9 (34.4)	98.3 (36.8)	102.7 (39.3)	103.6 (39.8)	98.8 (37.1)	93.1 (33.9)	83.6 (28.7)	78.1 (25.6)	104.9 (40.5)
Mean daily maximum °F (°C)	55.7 (13.2)	60.3 (15.7)	67.7 (19.8)	75.3 (24.1)	82.5 (28.1)	90.8 (32.7)	95.3 (35.2)	95.7 (35.4)	88.6 (31.4)	78.4 (25.8)	66.3 (19.1)	57.7 (14.3)	76.2 (24.6)
Daily mean °F (°C)	44.9 (7.2)	49.3 (9.6)	56.6 (13.7)	64.4 (18.0)	72.7 (22.6)	80.9 (27.2)	84.7 (29.3)	84.8 (29.3)	77.7 (25.4)	66.7 (19.3)	55.5 (13.1)	47.0 (8.3)	65.4 (18.6)
Mean daily minimum °F (°C)	34.1 (1.2)	38.3 (3.5)	45.4 (7.4)	53.5 (11.9)	62.8 (17.1)	71.1 (21.7)	74.1 (23.4)	73.9 (23.3)	66.7 (19.3)	55.1 (12.8)	44.7 (7.1)	36.3 (2.4)	54.7 (12.6)
Mean minimum °F (°C)	17.1 (−8.3)	21.8 (−5.7)	28.1 (−2.2)	36.3 (2.4)	46.8 (8.2)	59.3 (15.2)	65.0 (18.3)	64.5 (18.1)	52.3 (11.3)	37.4 (3.0)	27.1 (−2.7)	20.8 (−6.2)	14.2 (−9.9)
Record low °F (°C)	−3 (−19)	−12 (−24)	9 (−13)	26 (−3)	33 (1)	47 (8)	49 (9)	54 (12)	36 (2)	22 (−6)	15 (−9)	−1 (−18)	−12 (−24)
Average precipitation inches (mm)	2.62 (67)	2.73 (69)	3.59 (91)	3.53 (90)	4.73 (120)	3.75 (95)	2.25 (57)	2.09 (53)	3.45 (88)	4.46 (113)	2.78 (71)	2.91 (74)	38.89 (988)
Average snowfall inches (cm)	0.0 (0.0)	0.1 (0.25)	0.0 (0.0)	0.0 (0.0)	0.0 (0.0)	0.0 (0.0)	0.0 (0.0)	0.0 (0.0)	0.0 (0.0)	0.0 (0.0)	0.0 (0.0)	0.0 (0.0)	0.1 (0.25)
Average precipitation days (≥ 0.01 in)	8.1	7.8	9.2	8.0	9.9	8.0	5.2	5.5	6.7	7.7	7.2	7.9	91.2
Average snowy days (≥ 0.1 in)	0.0	0.1	0.0	0.0	0.0	0.0	0.0	0.0	0.0	0.0	0.0	0.0	0.1
Source: NOAA

== Demographics ==
Historical population
Census	Pop.	Note	%±
1880	199		—
1890	442		122.1%
1910	681		—
1920	821		20.6%
1930	936		14.0%
1940	1,043		11.4%
1950	1,824		74.9%
1960	2,821		54.7%
1970	7,049		149.9%
1980	11,801		67.4%
1990	29,202		147.5%
2000	42,059		44.0%
2010	46,334		10.2%
2020	50,631		9.3%
2024 (est.)	51,320		1.4%
U.S. Decennial Census

=== 2020 census ===
As of the 2020 census, Grapevine had a population of 50,631. The median age was 38.9 years. 21.0% of residents were under the age of 18 and 13.3% of residents were 65 years of age or older. For every 100 females there were 97.0 males, and for every 100 females age 18 and over there were 95.5 males age 18 and over.

99.9% of residents lived in urban areas, while 0.1% lived in rural areas.

There were 20,953 households in Grapevine, of which 28.9% had children under the age of 18 living in them. Of all households, 49.2% were married-couple households, 19.8% were households with a male householder and no spouse or partner present, and 24.7% were households with a female householder and no spouse or partner present. About 28.9% of all households were made up of individuals and 7.4% had someone living alone who was 65 years of age or older.

There were 22,236 housing units, of which 5.8% were vacant. The homeowner vacancy rate was 1.3% and the rental vacancy rate was 7.6%.

Racial composition as of the 2020 census
Race	Number	Percent
White	34,562	68.3%
Black or African American	2,323	4.6%
American Indian and Alaska Native	454	0.9%
Asian	3,180	6.3%
Native Hawaiian and Other Pacific Islander	67	0.1%
Some other race	3,584	7.1%
Two or more races	6,461	12.8%
Hispanic or Latino (of any race)	10,101	20.0%

Grapevine racial composition as of 2020 (NH = Non-Hispanic) (Note: Note: the US Census treats Hispanic/Latino as an ethnic category. This table excludes Latinos from the racial categories and assigns them to a separate category. Hispanics/Latinos can be of any race.)
Race	Number	Percentage
White (NH)	32,625	64.44%
Black or African American (NH)	2,231	4.41%
Native American or Alaska Native (NH)	167	0.33%
Asian (NH)	3,139	6.2%
Pacific Islander (NH)	63	0.12%
Some Other Race (NH)	197	0.39%
Multiracial (NH)	2,108	4.16%
Hispanic or Latino	10,101	19.95%
Total	50,631	

=== 2010 census ===
At the 2010 census, 46,334 people, 18,223 households, and 12,332 families were residing in the city. The population density was 1,451 people per square mile. The racial makeup of the city was 81.1% White, 3.3% African American, 0.7% Native American, 4.5% Asian, 8.0% from other races, and 2.2% from two or more races. Hispanic or Latino of any race were 18.0% of the population.

Of the 18,223 households in 2010, 33.6% had children under 18 living with them, 51.9% were married couples living together, 10.5% had a single householder with no spouse present, and 33.3% were not families. About 27.1% of all households were made up of individuals, and 14.4% had someone living alone who was 65 or older. The average household size was 2.49, and the average family size was 3.06. The age distribution in the city was 25.1% under 18, 74.9% over the age of 18, 5.6% from 20 to 24, 13.3% from 25 to 34, 24.7% from 35 to 49, 20.9% from 50 to 64, and 7.9% who were 65 or older. The median age was 37.5 years.

According to a 2010 estimate, the median household income was $76,040, and the median family income was $93,587. Males had a median income of $66,378 versus $47,995 for females. The per capita income was $38,304. About 5.2% of families and 7.9% of the population were below the poverty line, including 11.3% of those under age 18 and 5.5% of those age 65 or over.

=== City estimates ===
Data provided by the city's Economic Development Department show a general upward trend in population, with an estimated population of 54,578 as of 2020. The median age in the city was estimated at 36 years old, with more than half of residents obtaining an associate's degree or higher. Median household income had also increased to $88,225.

== Government ==
=== Municipal government ===
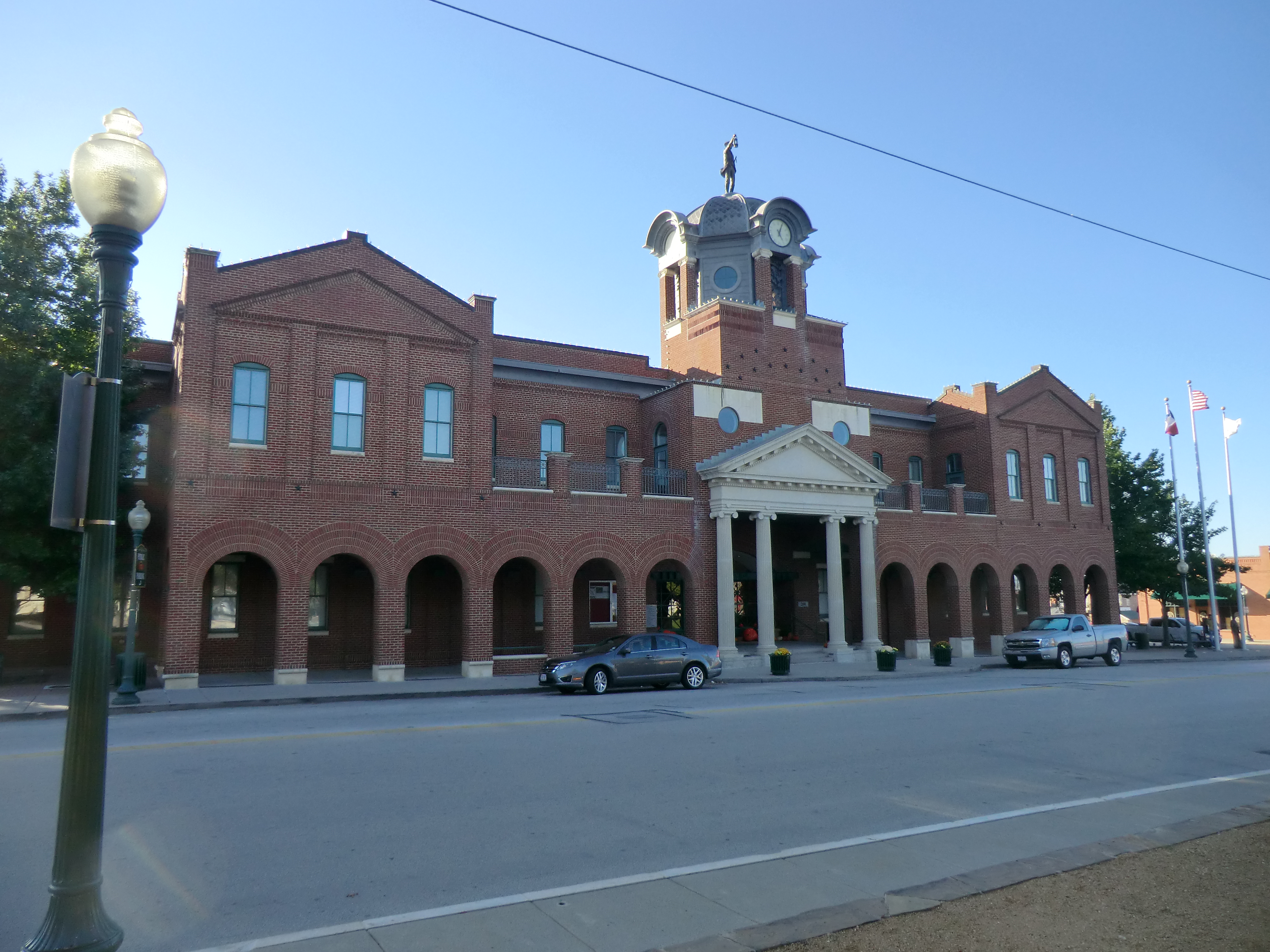
Grapevine City Hall

Grapevine uses a council–manager government, consisting of an elected city council, composed of the mayor and six at-large councilmembers, with a city manager appointed by the council. The current city manager is Bruno Rumbelow.

The government is a voluntary member of the North Central Texas Council of Governments.

The mayor is William D. Tate.

=== Politics ===
Grapevine, located in conservative Northeast Tarrant County, has voted Republican in all elections.

==== Texas Legislature ====
Office	Name	Party
Texas State Representative, District 63	Ben Bumgarner	Republican
Texas State Representative, District 98	Giovanni Capriglione	Republican
Texas State Representative, District 115	Cassandra Hernandez	Democrat
Texas State Senator, District 9	Taylor Rehmet	Democrat
Texas State Senator, District 10	Phil King	Republican
Texas State Senator, District 12	Tan Parker	Republican
Texas State Senator, District 16	Nathan M. Johnson	Democrat

The city almost entirely lies within the boundaries of Texas House District 98 and Texas Senate Districts 9 and 12, with very small portions lying within Texas House Districts 63 and 115 and Texas Senate Districts 10 and 16.

==== United States House of Representatives ====
Office	Name	Party
United States Representative, Texas's 24th congressional district	Beth Van Duyne	Republican

== Education ==
The Grapevine-Colleyville Independent School District serves most of the city. The district operates 11 elementary schools (prekindergarten through grade 5), four middle schools (grades 6–8), and two high schools (grades 9–12). Colleyville Heritage High School and Grapevine High School both draw students from different areas of Grapevine.

Northwestern Grapevine lies inside Carroll Independent School District, while smaller portions are served by Lewisville Independent School District and Coppell Independent School District.

The Faith Christian School, a private school, is also in Grapevine.

== Economy ==
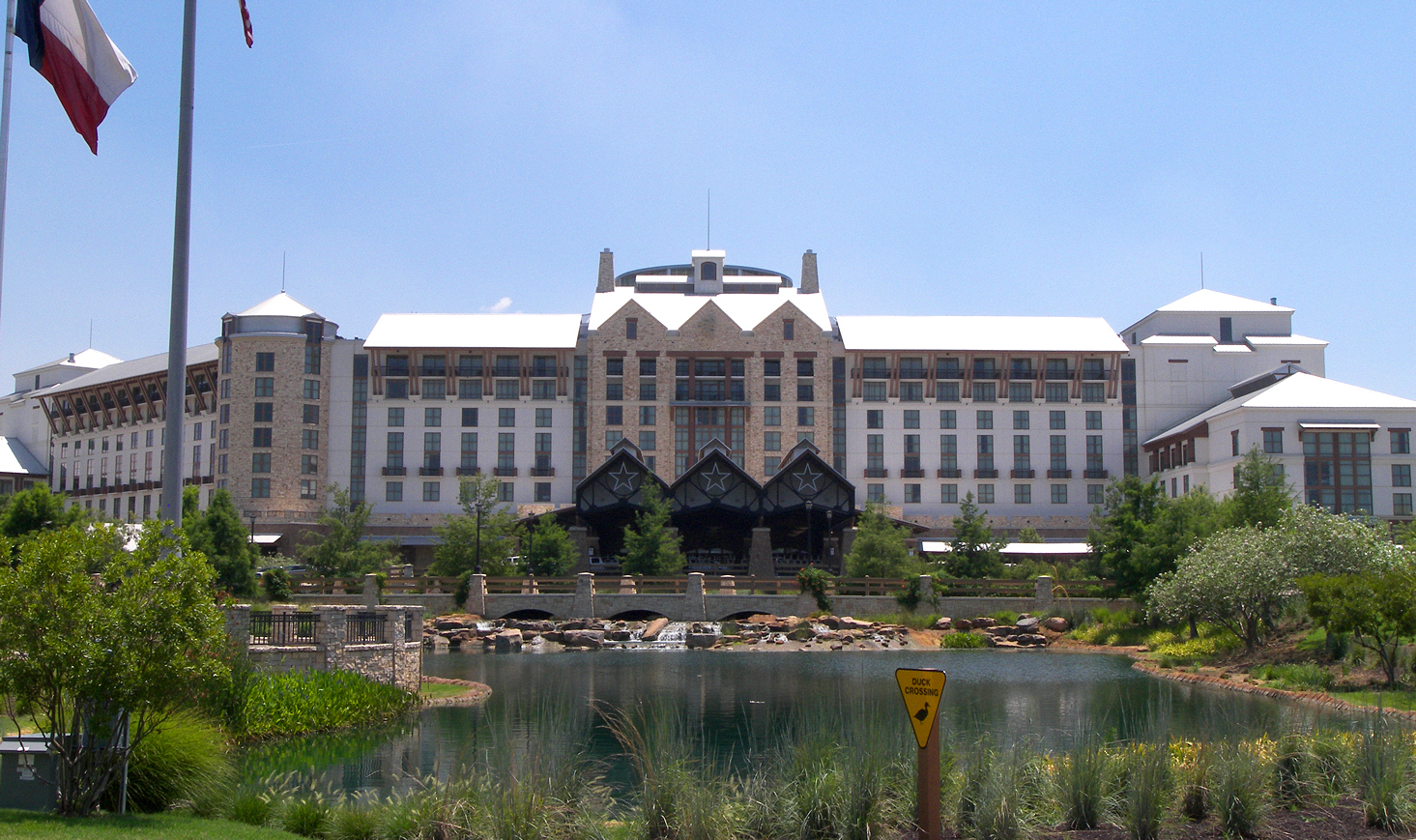
Gaylord Texan Resort

Grapevine's economy is largely centered around travel and tourism, although those sectors also promote strong growth in other areas such as entertainment, retail trade, and transportation. Travelers arriving to and departing from Dallas/Fort Worth International Airport make up the majority of the city's visitors. The Gaylord Texan and Great Wolf Lodge are the two biggest hotels in Grapevine and among the biggest in the Metroplex. The hotels also have large convention centers and entertainment venues. In 2020, Coury Hospitality launched Hotel Vin, a new boutique hotel attached to the recently finished TEXRail station.

Nearby Grapevine Mills Mall is a regional outlet shopping center with many amenities, including a movie theater. Embassy Suites Grapevine and the DFW Lakes Hilton complex also lay adjacent to Grapevine Mills and Bass Pro Shops.

In addition to these areas, Main Street in historic downtown Grapevine is a popular attraction. Public amenities like City Hall, the Grapevine Convention and Visitor's Bureau, the city library, public parks, and a recreation center are located on Main Street, nestled in between a wealth of small businesses. These include antique stores, restaurants, bars, theaters, and many specialty shops. The Grapevine Vintage Railroad follows a historic route between Grapevine and the Fort Worth Stockyards, departing from a station on South Main Street. The city is also the home of several wineries and tasting rooms including Umbra Winery as well as the Texas Wine and Grape Growers Association.

According to the city's 2022 Annual Comprehensive Financial Report, the city's top employers are:

#	Employer	# of Employees
1	Gaylord Texan Resort	2,000
2	Dallas/Fort Worth International Airport	1,980
3	Grapevine Colleyville ISD	1,700
4	Paycom	900
5	City of Grapevine	700
6	Baylor Medical	660
7	Great Wolf Lodge	600
8	Hyatt Regency DFW	500
9	Texas Toyota of Grapevine	350
10	American Warranty Service	340

GameStop, a national electronics retailer and one of the city's largest corporate employers, is headquartered in Grapevine.

In April 2017, Kubota Corp. established a new U.S. headquarters in Grapevine, moving about 300 employees from California and spending $50 million.

The facility at 1639 West 23rd Street is on the property of DFW Airport and in Grapevine. Tenants include China Airlines, Lufthansa Cargo, and the U.S. Fish and Wildlife Service.

Historically, Grapevine was the headquarters of a collection of now-defunct air carriers. In 1978 Braniff Place, the final world headquarters for Braniff International Airways, was built in what is now Grapevine, on the grounds of Dallas/Fort Worth International Airport. Following Braniff's 1982 bankruptcy, the structure is now known as Verizon Place. In the 1990s Metro Airlines maintained its main offices in the city of Grapevine, as did Kitty Hawk Aircargo for a time.

== Transportation ==
=== Highways ===
Two grade-separated highways run through the city. State Highways 114 and 121 trisect Grapevine south and slightly west of downtown. 121 runs from the south and 114 from the northwest. The highways intersect near Mustang Drive and William D. Tate Avenue and continue together towards the airport before splitting again at the north entrance of Dallas/Fort Worth International Airport. Grapevine's highways 2010 underwent a significant overhaul to improve traffic flow through the area.

==== Major Roads ====
- I-635 (Lyndon B. Johnson Freeway)
- SH 26 (Ira E. Woods Avenue)
- SH 114 (Northwest Parkway)
- Bus. SH 114 (Northwest Highway)
- SH 121
- SH 360
- Spur 97 (International Parkway)
- FM 2499

=== Airports ===
Dallas/Fort Worth International Airport is the main provider of air service to Grapevine and the region, providing connections to places around the state, country, and abroad. DFW is the main hub for American Airlines, though other major carriers maintain a large presence. Love Field in Dallas is relatively close to Grapevine.

=== Rail ===
The Grapevine Vintage Railroad provides service to and from Historic Fort Worth Stockyards along the former Cotton Belt Railroad right-of-way. The service acts more as a tourist attraction due to its slow speeds. However, the city's 50-year commitment to the Trinity Metro and approval of a half-cent sales tax increase have paid dividends through the introduction of the TEXRail service to northeast Tarrant County since January 10, 2019. New train stations downtown and north of the airport are included in the plans, as is a connection to Dallas Area Rapid Transit (DART) light rail provides mass transit service to the eastern half of the Dallas–Fort Worth metroplex.

TEXRail service is available in Grapevine at both DFW Airport North Station, and Grapevine Main Street Station. DART Silver Line Service is expected to begin at DFW Airport North Station by mid-2026.

=== Bus ===
The Convention and Visitor's Bureau operates the Grapevine Visitor's Shuttle between points of interest within the city. Additional information including stops and pricing can be found here.

=== Bicycle ===
The majority of Grapevine's transportation infrastructure is centered around the automobile, though amenities for bicycles can be found. A bicycle route runs along the length of Dove Road beginning at the intersection of Dove and North Main Street, connecting Grapevine and Southlake.

Additionally, the Cotton Belt trail runs parallel to State Highway 26, from the Colleyville city limits to downtown Grapevine. The "Dallas Road" project will stretch over 1.5 miles to extend the Cotton Belt Trail with a 10-foot wide trail section along the north side of western Dallas road between William D Tate Avenue, Ball Street, and Dooley Street. A 10-foot-wide trail will also be added along the east side of Dooley north from Dallas Road to the Dallas Area Rapid Transit right of way. A 12-foot-trail section will be added east from Dooley along the north side of the DART rail corridor to Texan Trail. This will provide a very wide cement trail from Colleyville to the far east side of Grapevine.

Other bicycle paths can be found at the various city parks, most notably the trail from Parr Park to Bear Creek Park. Off-road trails are also available. The Northshore Mountain Bike trail begins at Rockledge Park on the north side of Grapevine Lake and continues into Flower Mound along the shore. Mileage is 22.5 miles broken up into two major loops: East Loops, 1 – 4, which are 12.5 miles, and the West Loops, 5 – 7. Horseshoe Trail begins at Catfish Lane, continues to Dove Road, and loops back to the trailhead, for a total of 5.4 miles.

=== Running ===
Grapevine received the Runner Friendly Community designation from the Road Runners Club of America. Grapevine has approximately 24 miles of hike and bike trails that link parks, schools, and businesses. The hike and bike trails have mileage markers that also have GPS coordinates for location identification in case of emergencies. The city also has an indoor 1/8 mile walking/jogging track and several outdoor tracks that belong to the local school district. The city has a joint-use agreement with the school district for the use of school facilities.

The hike and bike trails in Grapevine include water fountains, community bathrooms or portable toilets, available parking, signs linking pedestrian networks, mile markers, walk lights at busy intersections, stop signs at residential intersections, and painted crosswalks. One trail in Grapevine links with four other communities, creating an additional 11-mile trail.

== Media ==
- Grapevine is mentioned in the National Geographic Channel special, The Real Bonnie and Clyde. The historical marker (at Dove Road and Highway 114) where Bonnie, Clyde, and Henry Methvin shot two Texas state troopers is shown.
- An episode of true crime show Snapped is set in Grapevine.
- Some scenes from the film Tender Mercies are also set in Grapevine.
- Miracle Dogs Too was filmed in Grapevine in 2006.
- Portions of RoboCop were filmed at B&D Mills.
- The Nat Geo Wild Series, "Dr. T, Lone Star Vet" is filmed at Texas Avian & Exotic Animal Hospital in Grapevine.

== Notable people ==
- Jaimie Alexander, actress, born in Greenville, South Carolina, lived in Grapevine from age 4 to age 18
- Zach Bolton, voice actor and ADR director affiliated with Funimation
- Joe Bob Briggs, film critic
- Reggie Cannon, professional soccer player with FC Dallas, Boavista
- Bryson Dechambeau, professional golfer, winner of two major championships
- Jenna Dewan, actress
- Wally Funk, aviator, space tourist, and Goodwill Ambassador
- Chip Gaines, TV personality
- Greg Garza, a professional soccer player with FC Cincinnati
- Mckenna Grace, actress
- Brad Gross, racing driver
- Annie Ilonzeh, actress
- Norah Jones, singer-songwriter and actress, born in Brooklyn, New York, lived in Grapevine
- Nick Leckey, NFL center for the New Orleans Saints, St. Louis Rams, and the Arizona Cardinals
- Demi Lovato, singer/songwriter
- Post Malone, rapper and singer-songwriter
- George McFarland, actor as Spanky of Our Gang/The Little Rascals
- Jaret Reddick, lead singer of Bowling for Soup
- Thomas Rousseau, founder and leader of Patriot Front
- Shea Salinas, professional soccer player with San Jose Earthquakes
- Guy Snodgrass, TOPGUN Instructor and author

== Places ==
- Dallas/Fort Worth International Airport
- Fellowship Church
- Gaylord Texan
- Grapevine Mills Mall
- Lake Grapevine
- Great Wolf Lodge Grapevine
- Historic Downtown
- 9/11 Flight Crew Memorial
- B & D Mills

== Gallery ==
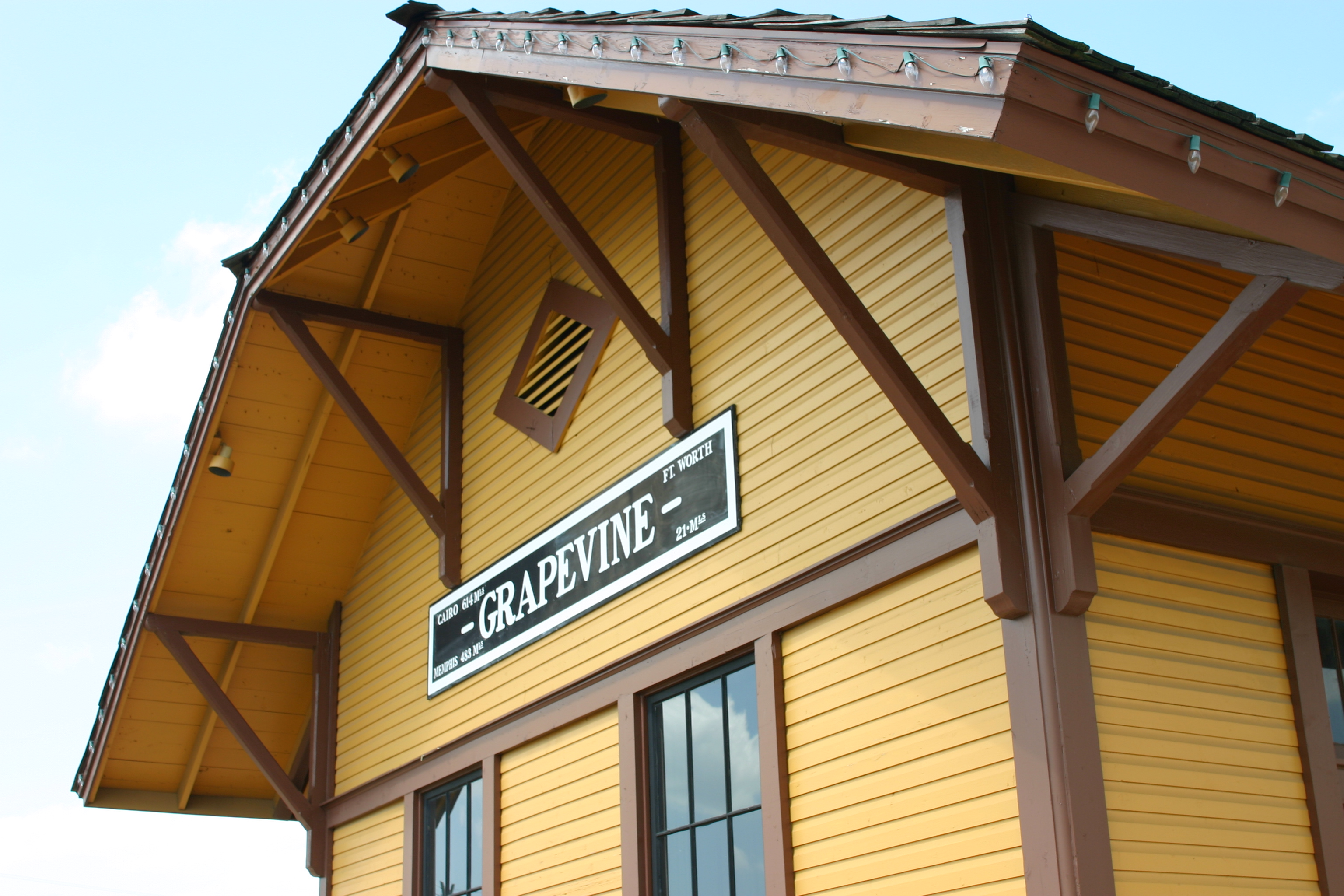
The Train Station on Main Street

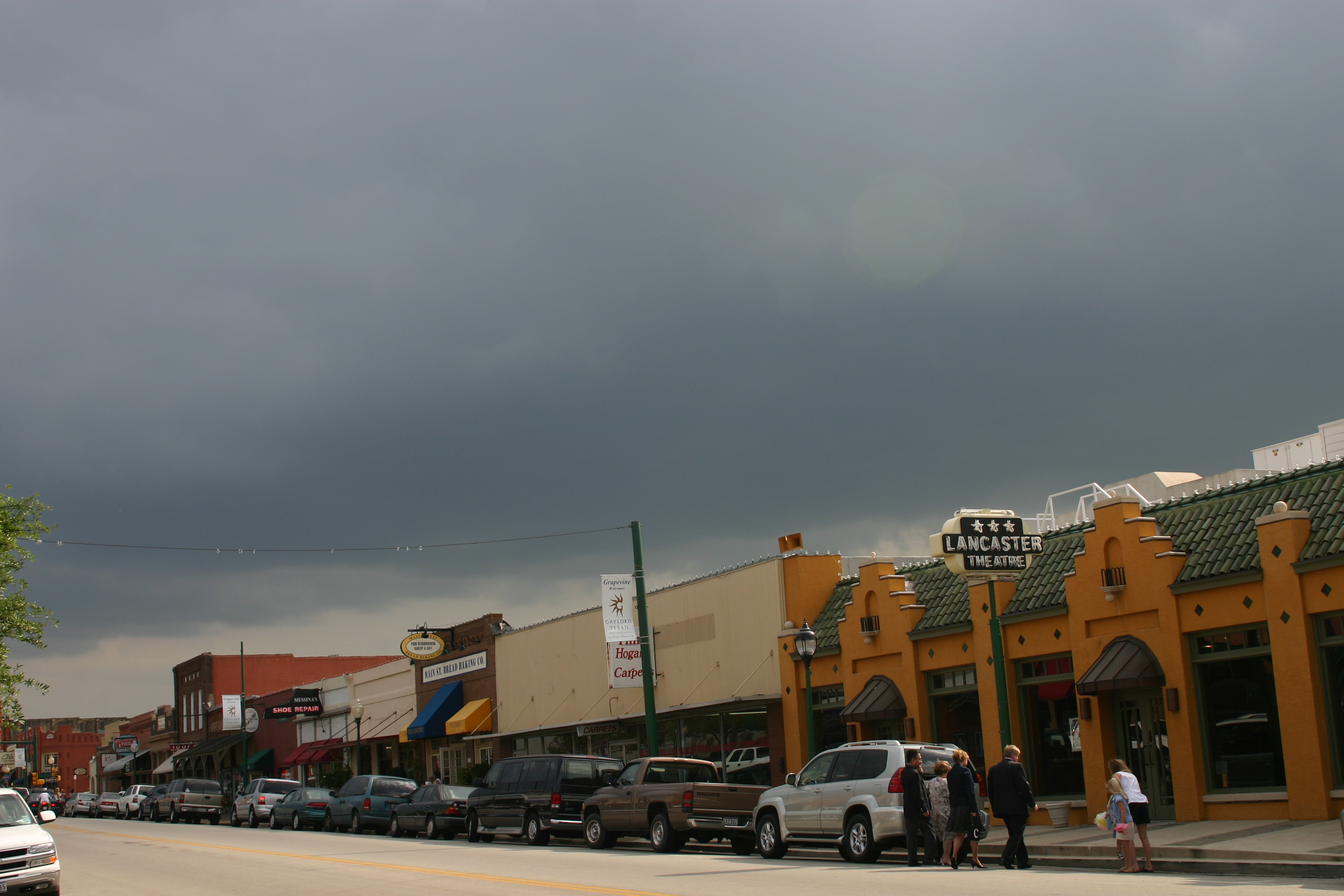
Main Street

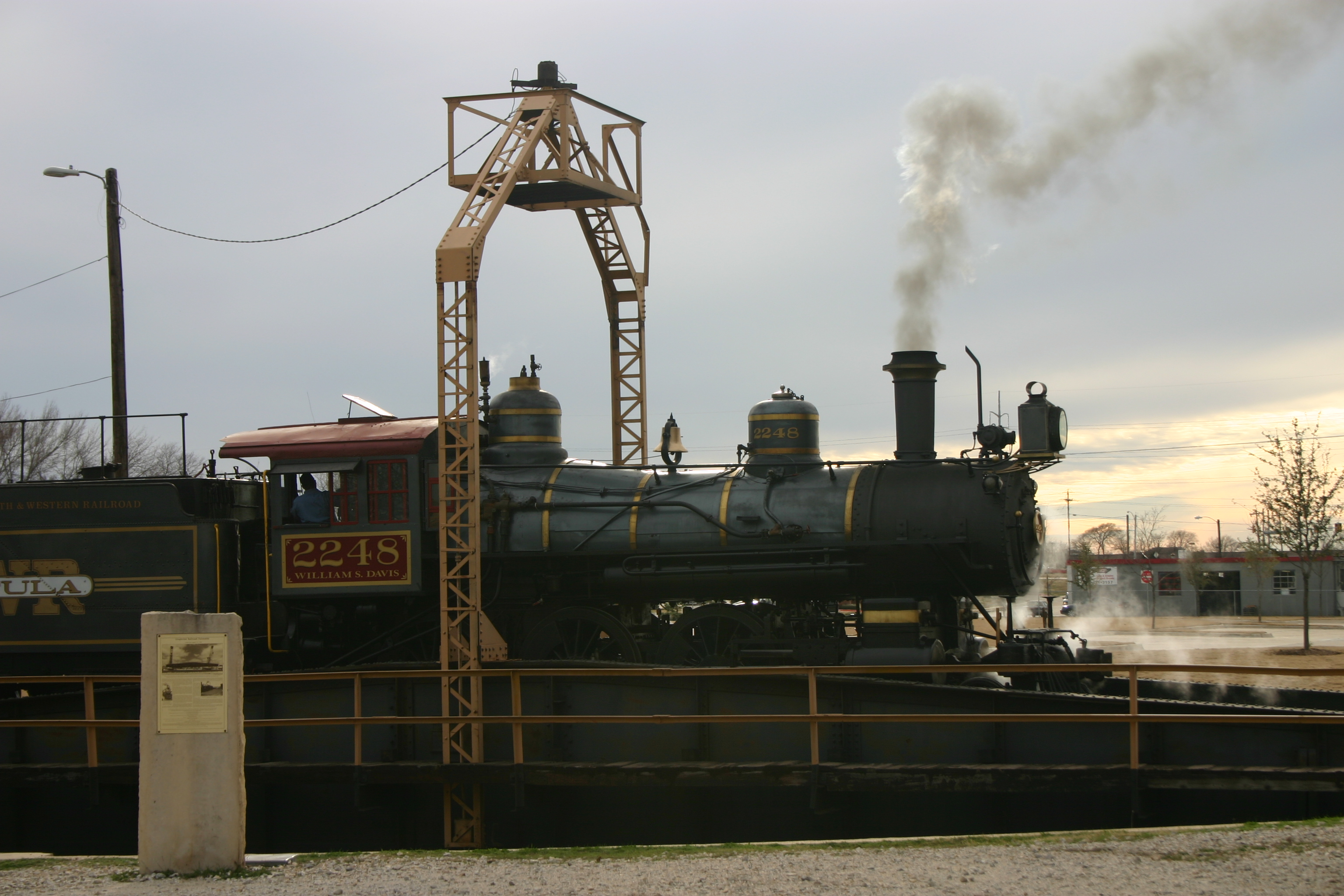
The Tarantula Train

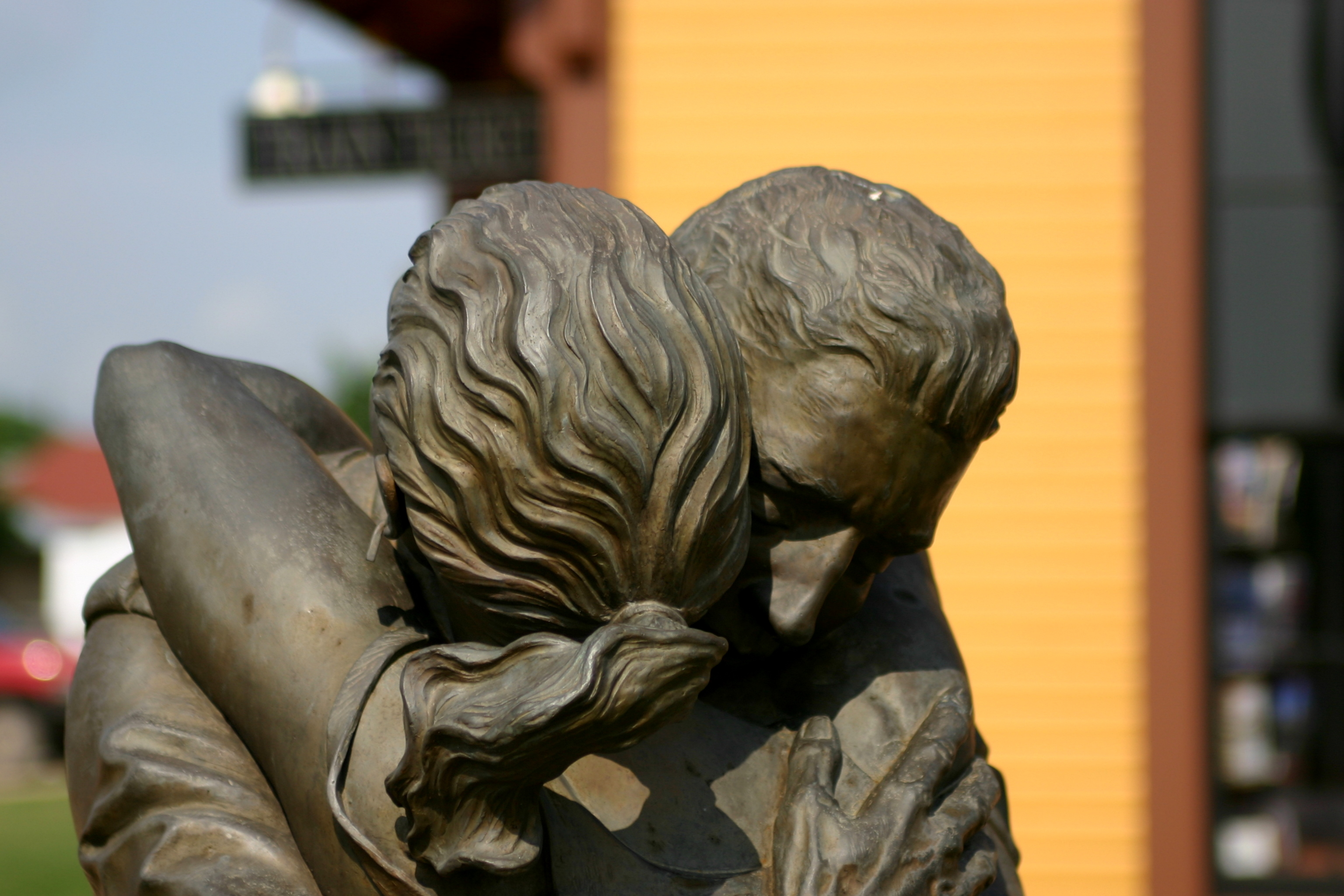
Statue in front of the train station

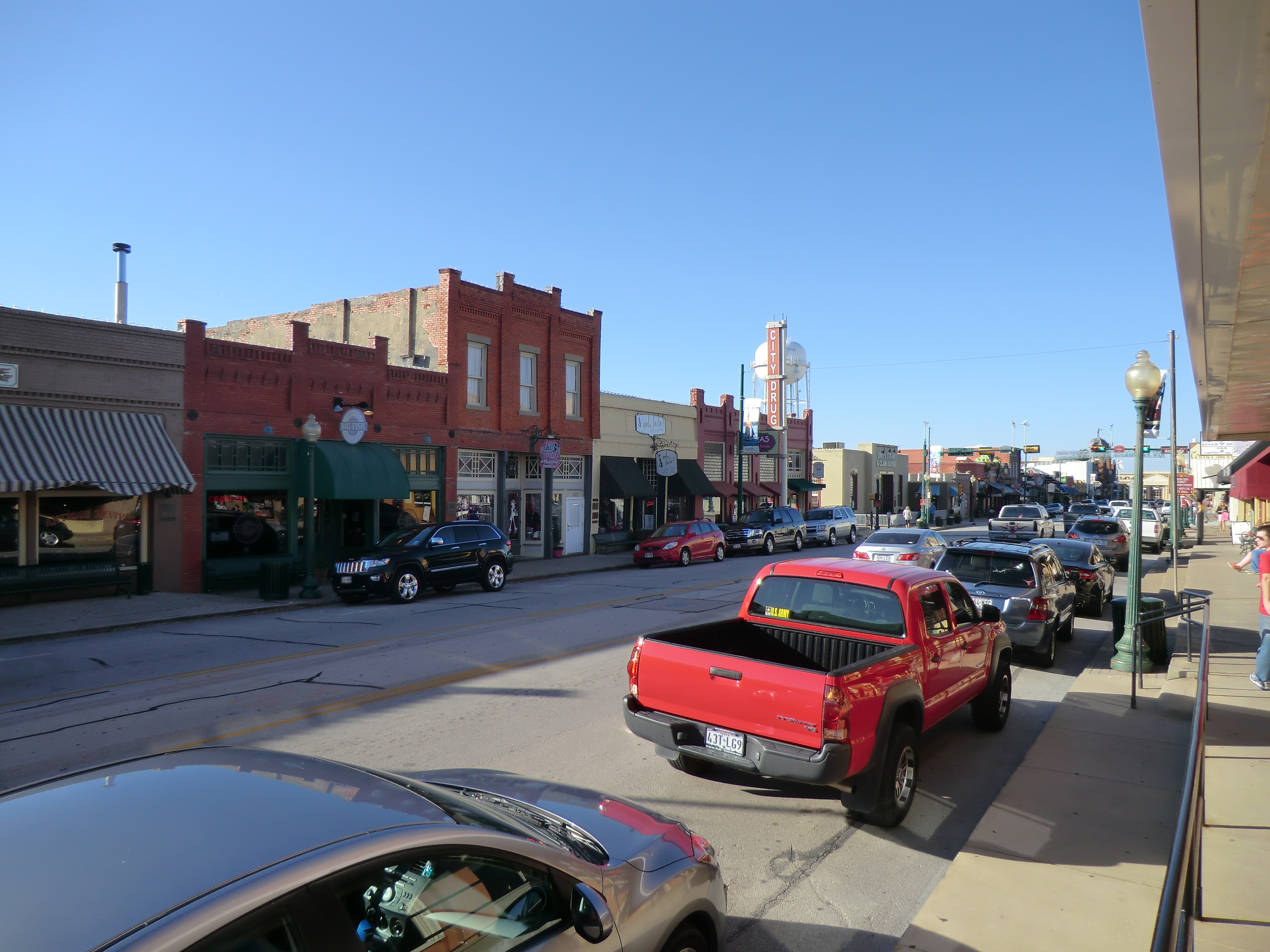
Looking north-west on Main Street

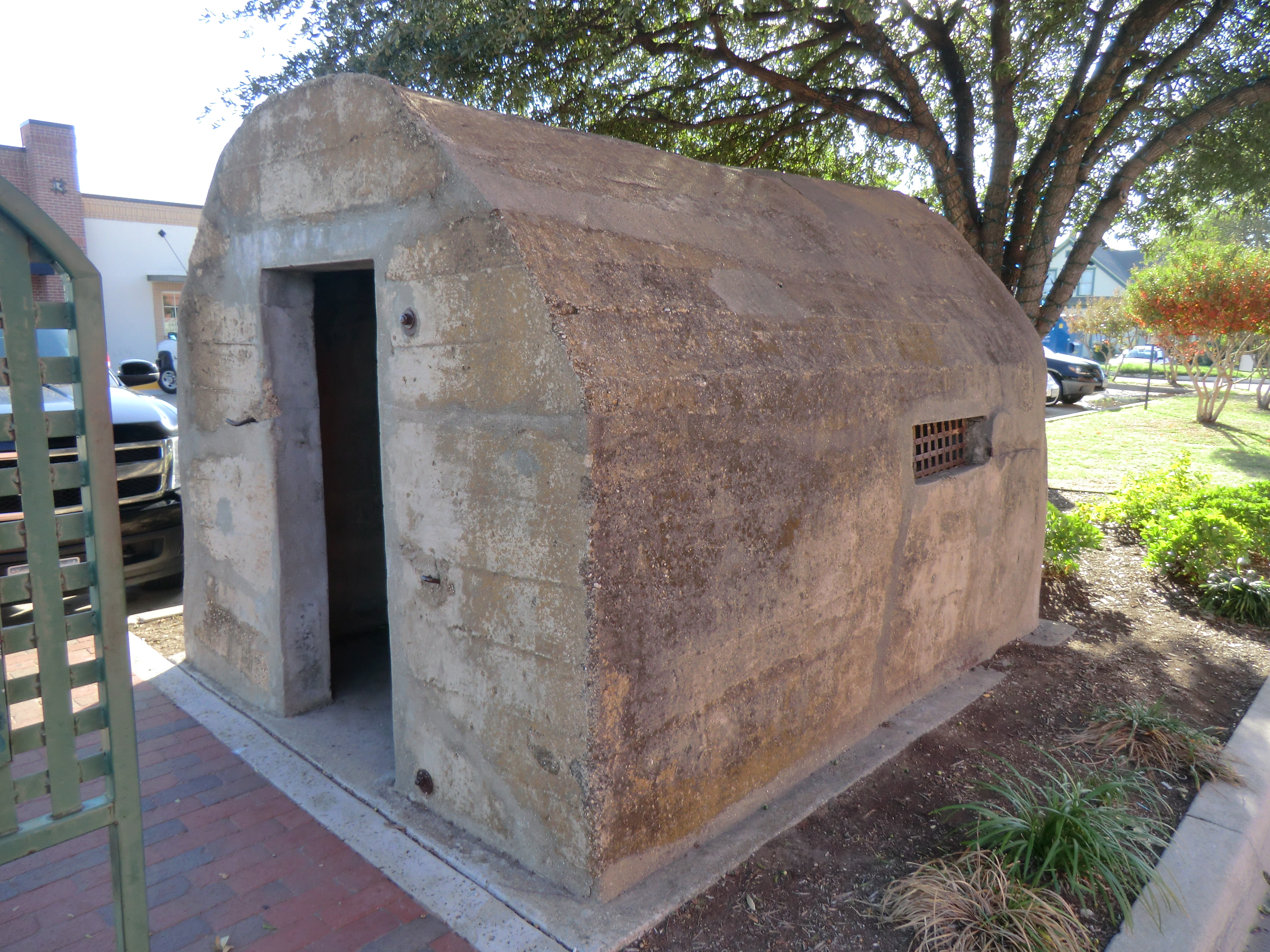
The old calaboose (jail) built in 1909

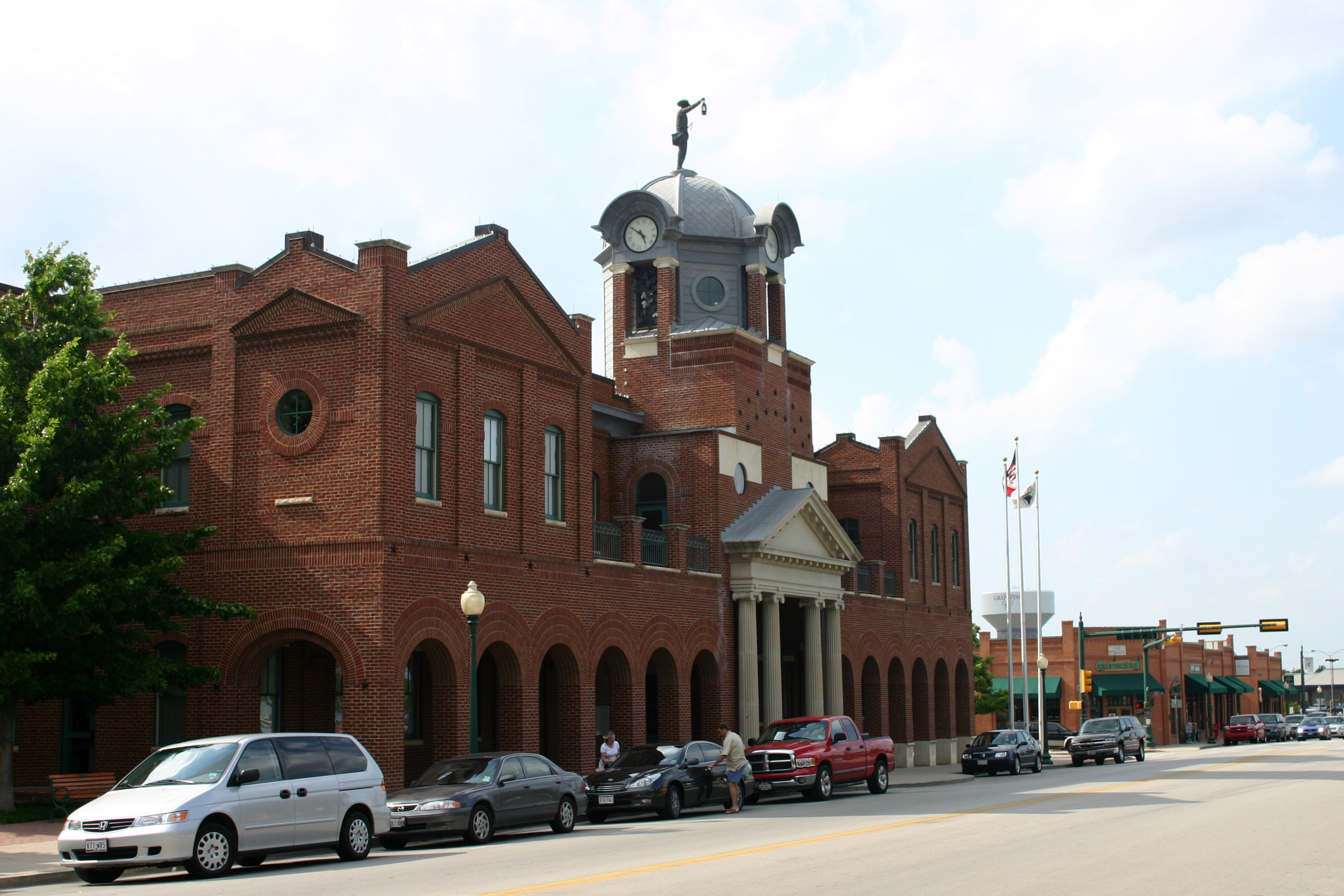
Grapevine City Hall on Main Street

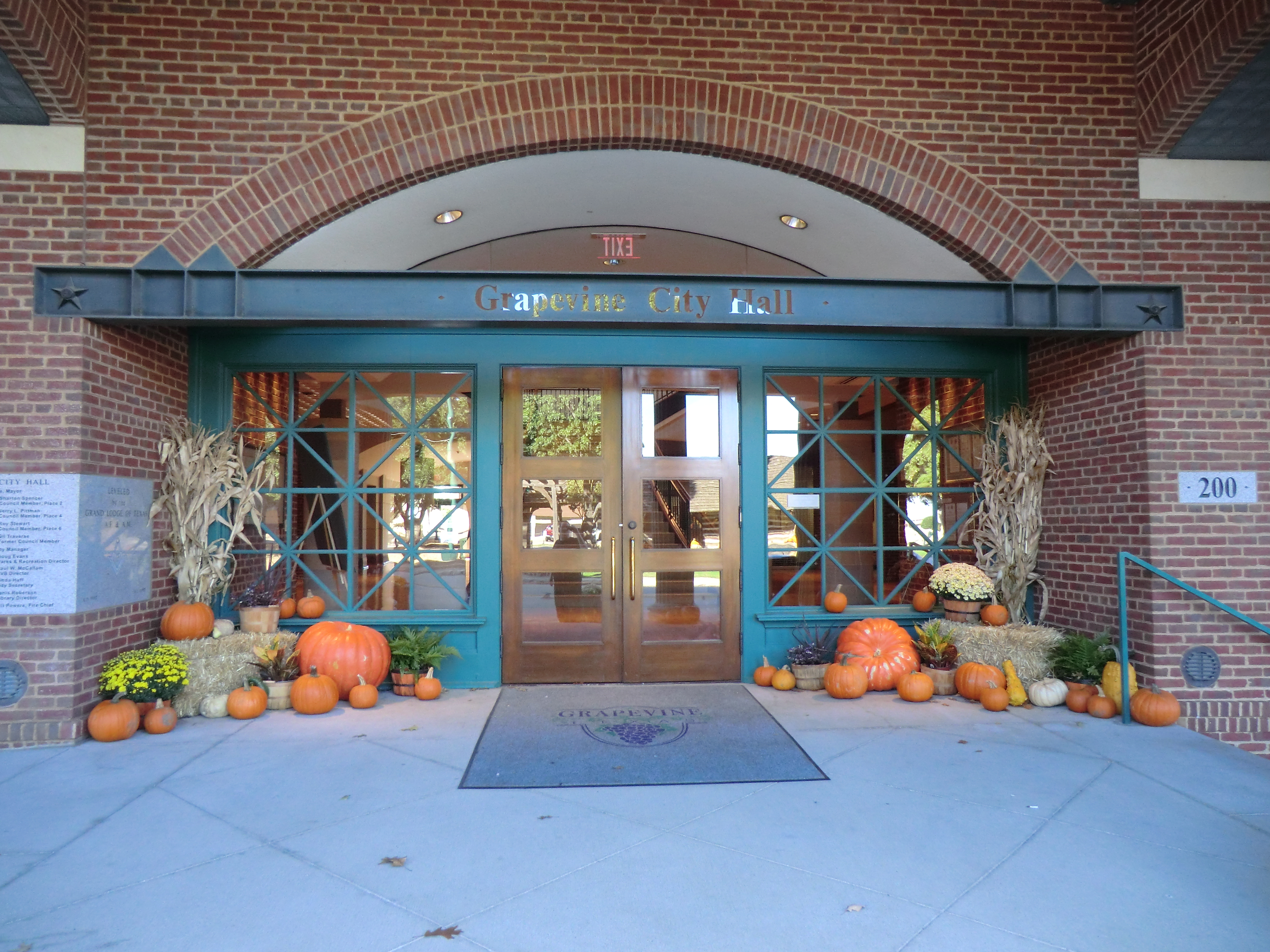
Front entrance to Grapevine City Hall

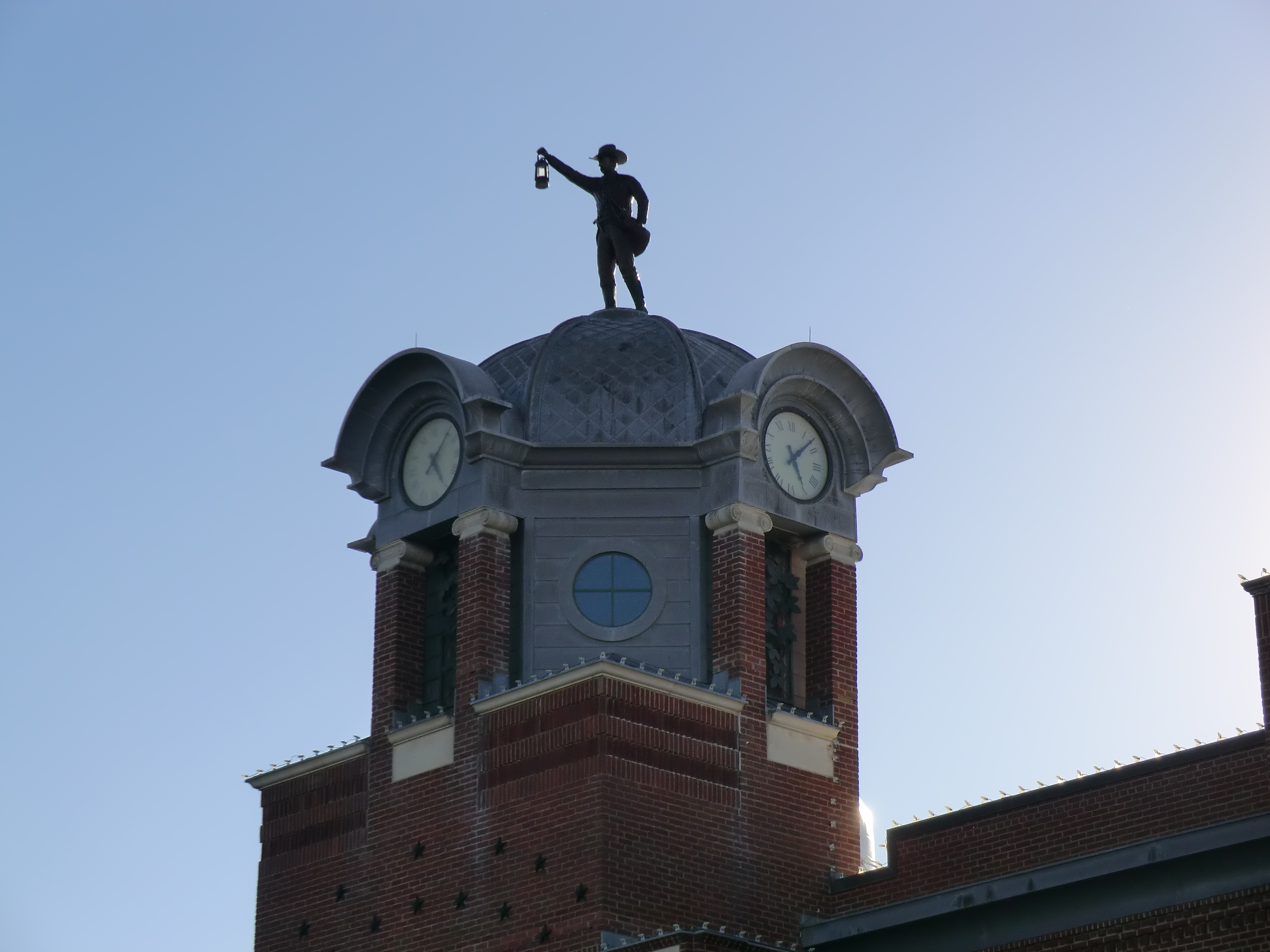
The Nightwatchman statue atop City Hall

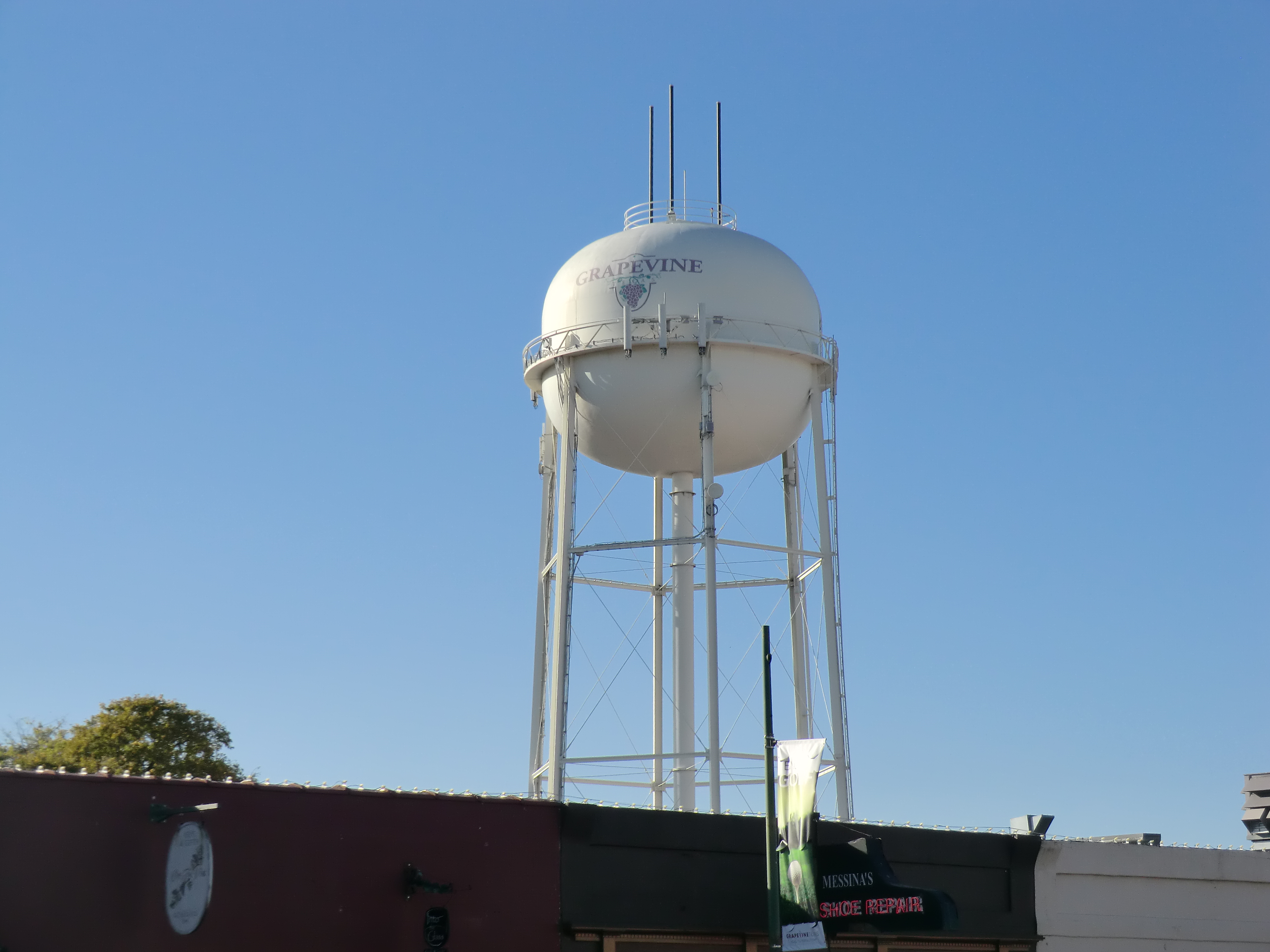
Grapevine Water Tower from Main Street

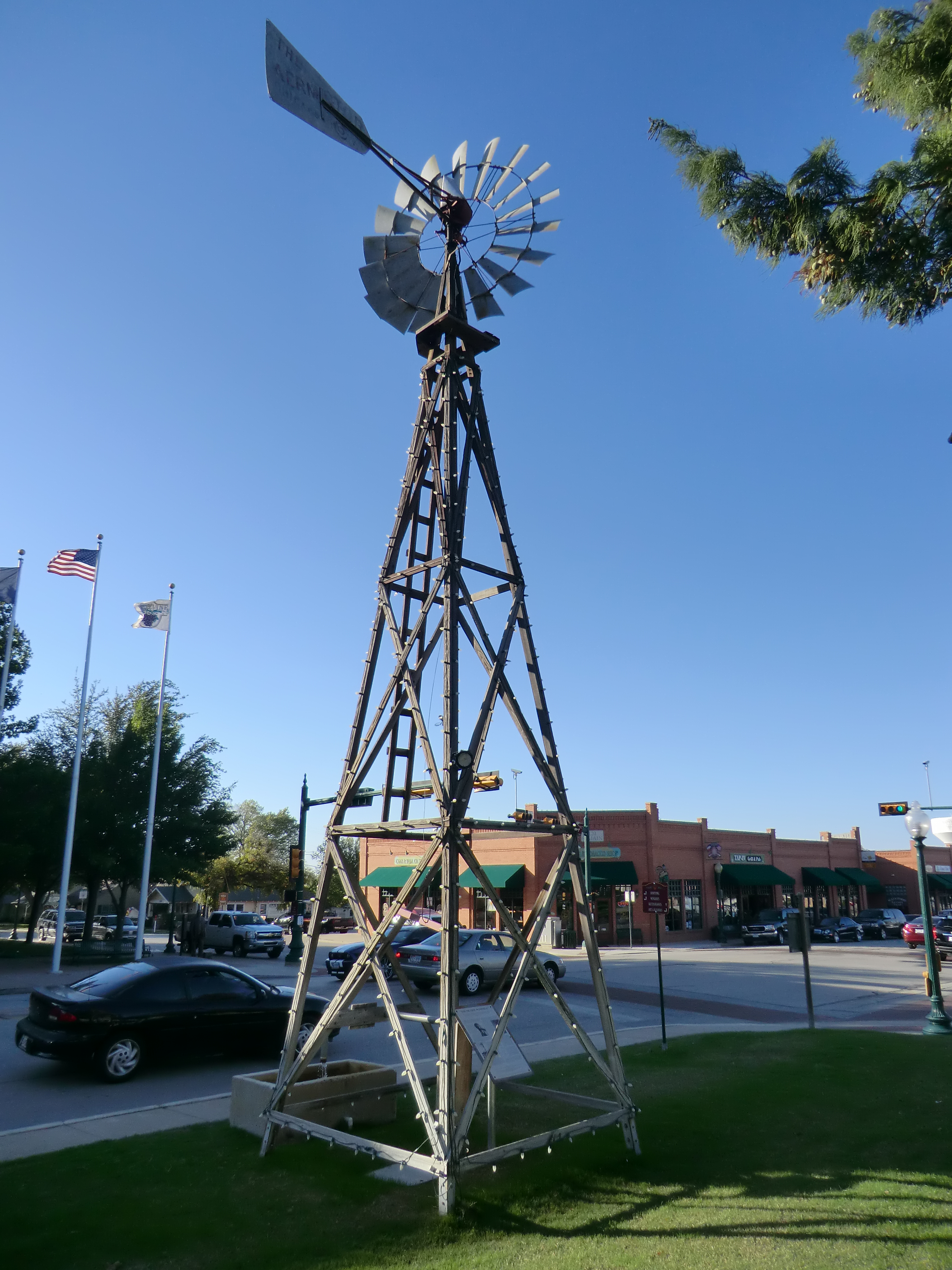
Water-pumping windmill on Main Street

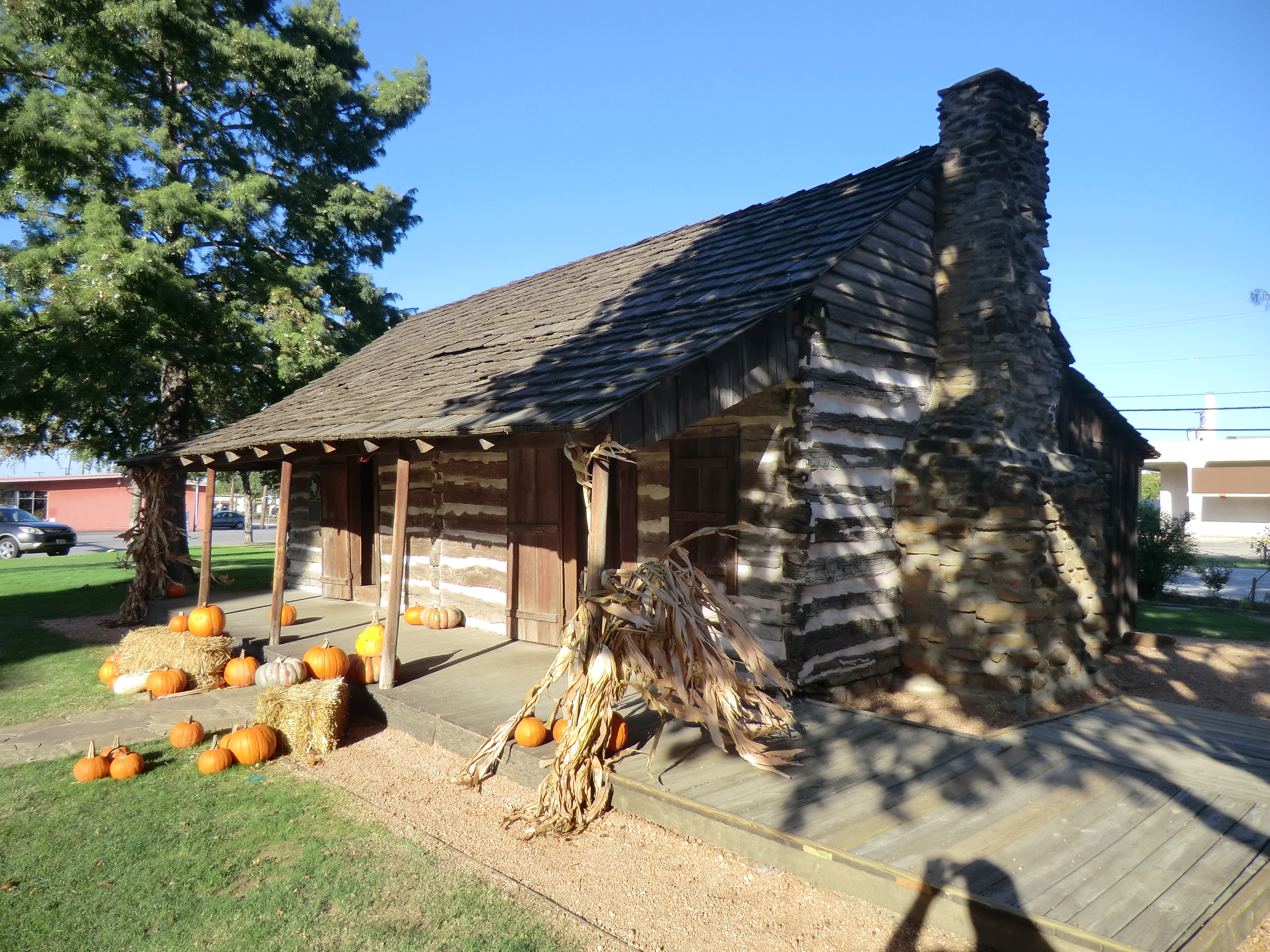
The "Torian Log Cabin" on Main Street

== Sister cities ==
- Krems an der Donau, Austria (since 1999)
- Parras de la Fuente, Mexico (since 1996)
- Livingston, West Lothian, Scotland (since 2008)
