= Grapevine-Colleyville Independent School District =

School district in Texas

Location
- 3051 Ira E. Woods Avenue, Grapevine, TX 76051 United States of America

District information
- Type: Public
- Motto: Redefining Education
- Grades: Pre-K through 12
- Established: 1869
- Superintendent: Rick Demasters
- Governing agency: Texas Education Agency
- Budget: $172 million
- NCES District ID: 4821660

Students and staff
- Students: 13,812
- Teachers: 944
- Staff: 911

Other information
- Website: www.gcisd.net

Grapevine-Colleyville Independent School District (GCISD) is a public school district based in Grapevine, Texas, USA. The district serves most of the cities of Grapevine and Colleyville and includes small portions of Euless, Hurst, and Southlake. In addition to being in Tarrant County, the district extends into Dallas County, where it includes parts of Irving and Coppell. The district operates eleven elementary schools, four middle schools, and two traditional high schools, in addition to an early college high school and a virtual school.

In 2009, the school district was rated "recognized" by the Texas Education Agency. In 2018, under the new Texas school rating system, the district received an overall rating of "A" and every campus was rated as "Met Standard".

As of 2018, the district enrolls 13,812 students and has a 97% graduation rate.

== Governance ==
Grapevine-Colleyville Independent School District, like almost every other school district in Texas, is independent of any city or county government with an elected school board consisting of seven at-large members who appoint a superintendent.

=== Superintendent ===
The current interim Superintendent is Rick Demasters, who joined the district in December of 2025.

=== School Board ===
Place	Name
Place 1	Shannon Braun
Place 2	Dalia Begin President
Place 3	Matt Foust Vice President
Place 4	Kathy Florence Spradley
Place 5	Matthew White
Place 6	Lindsey Sheguit
Place 7	Darrell Brown Secretary

== Schools and Facilities ==
High schools (grades 9-12)
Name	Established	Mascot	Colors	Location	Additional information
Grapevine High School	1952	Mustangs	Red, Royal Blue, & White	Grapevine	Current campus opened in 1969
Colleyville Heritage High School	1996	Panthers	Red & Black	Colleyville	
Collegiate Academy at Tarrant County College-Northeast Campus	2014	Phoenix	Red & Yellow	Hurst	Located at TCC-Northeast Campus

Middle schools (grades 6-8)
Name	Established	Mascot	Colors	Location	Additional information
Grapevine Middle School	1969	Ponies	Red & White	Grapevine	Current campus opened in 2001
Colleyville Middle School	1975	Colts	Royal Blye & White	Colleyville	
Cross Timbers Middle School	1990	Wolves	Black & Silver	Grapevine	
Heritage Middle School	1992	Broncos	Blue & Gold	Colleyville	

Elementary schools (grades PK-5)
Name	Established	Mascot	Colors	Location	Additional information
Bear Creek Elementary School	1988	Bears	Blue & Gold	Euless	
Cannon Elementary School	1959	Cubs	Dark Blue & Gray	Grapevine	Current campus opened in 2018; STEM school
Colleyville Elementary School	1963	Cowboys	Red, White, & Blue	Colleyville	Current campus opened in 2007
Glenhope Elementary School	1995	Gators	Green & Blue	Colleyville	
Grapevine Elementary School	1994	Stars	Maroon, Blue, & Gold	Grapevine	
Heritage Elementary School	1991	Eagles	Red, Royal Blue, & White	Colleyville	
O.C. Taylor Elementary School	1986	Tigers	Navy & Orange	Colleyville	
Silver Lake Elementary School	1995	Shooting Stars	Royal Blue & Green	Grapevine	
Timberline Elementary School	1979	Tigers	Crimson, Black, & White	Grapevine	Current campus opened in 1997

Former schools
Name	Established	Closed	Mascot	Colors	Location	Additional information
Dove Elementary School	1972	2026	Dolphins	Columbia & White	Grapevine	Closed as a PK-5 school
Bransford Elementary School	1993	2026	Texans	Red, White, & Blue	Colleyville	Closed as a PK-5 school

=== Athletic Facilities ===
Facility Name	Address	Opened
Mustang-Panther Stadium	3000 Ira E. Woods Avenue Grapevine, TX 76051	1969 (Remodeled in 2018)
GCISD Swim Center	2305 Pool Road Grapevine, TX 76051	1994
