= Cotton Belt Railroad Industrial Historic District =

Historic district in Texas, United States

- U.S. National Register of Historic Places
- U.S. Historic district
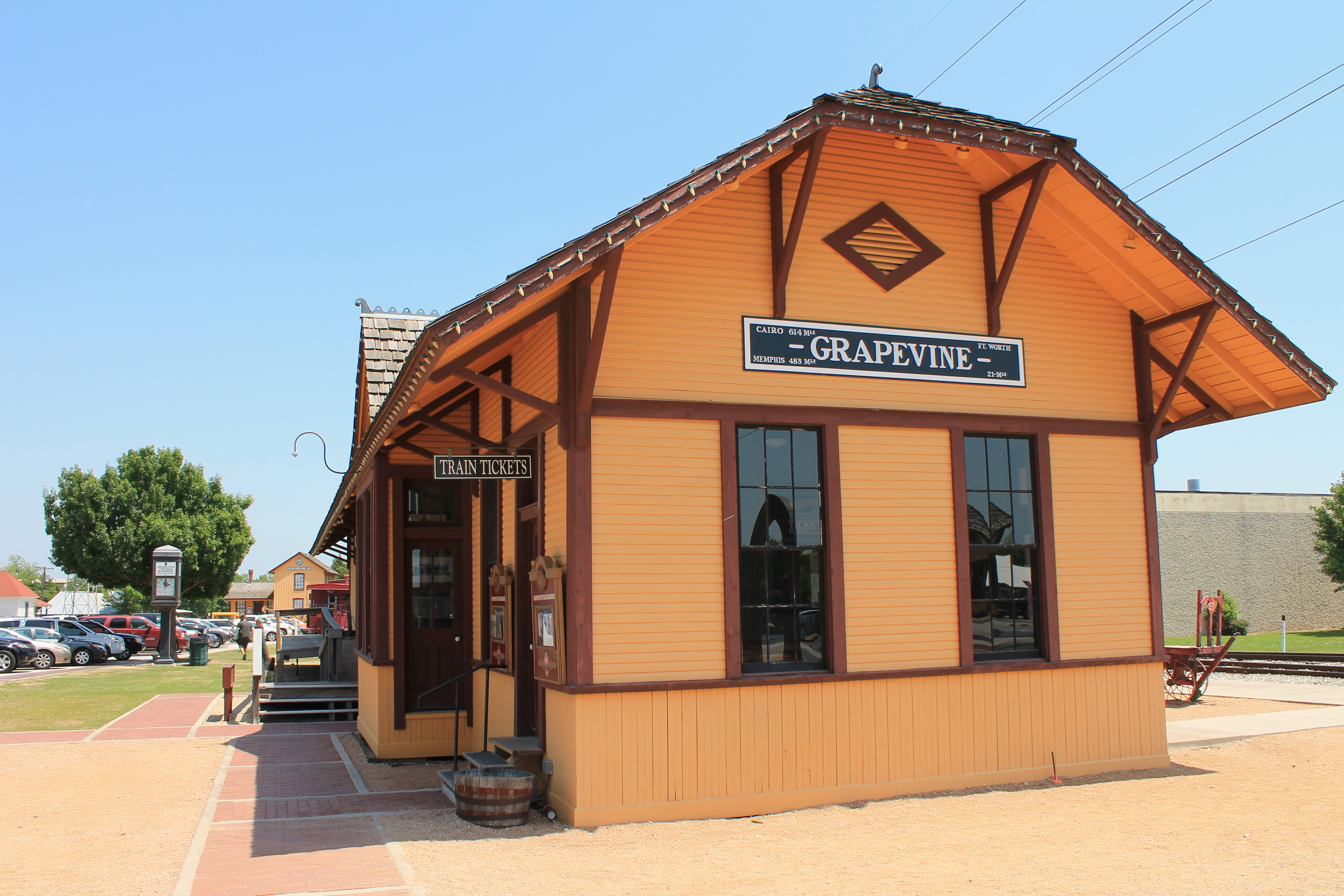
- Grapevine Station on the Cotton Belt line

- Location within Texas Location within the United States
- Location: Along RR tracks, roughly bounded by Hudgins, Dooley, and Dallas Sts., Grapevine, Texas
- Coordinates: 32°45′32″N 97°19′38″W
- Area: 13.7 acres (5.5 ha)
- Built: 1888
- MPS: Grapevine MPS
- NRHP reference No.: 97001109
- Added to NRHP: September 4, 1997

Cotton Belt Railroad Industrial Historic District is located in the eastern part of Grapevine, Texas.

It was added to the National Register on September 4, 1997.

== B & D Mills ==
The B & D Mills was a Mill constructed in 1902 Grapevine, Texas and is listed in the National Register of Historic Places under the Cotton Belt Rail Road Historic District. Kirby Buckner and W. D. Deacon bought the mill in 1933 and changed it into a feed manufacturing complex.

In 1939 an east warehouse was constructed and a concrete grain elevator was completed in 1950. The tower was completed in 1956 which made the facility the first electronic feed manufacturing plant in Texas and also the first business to deliver bulk feed. The mill closed down in 1979. In 1995 a fire damaged many parts of the building and also damaged parts of the tower's panels.

== Photo gallery ==
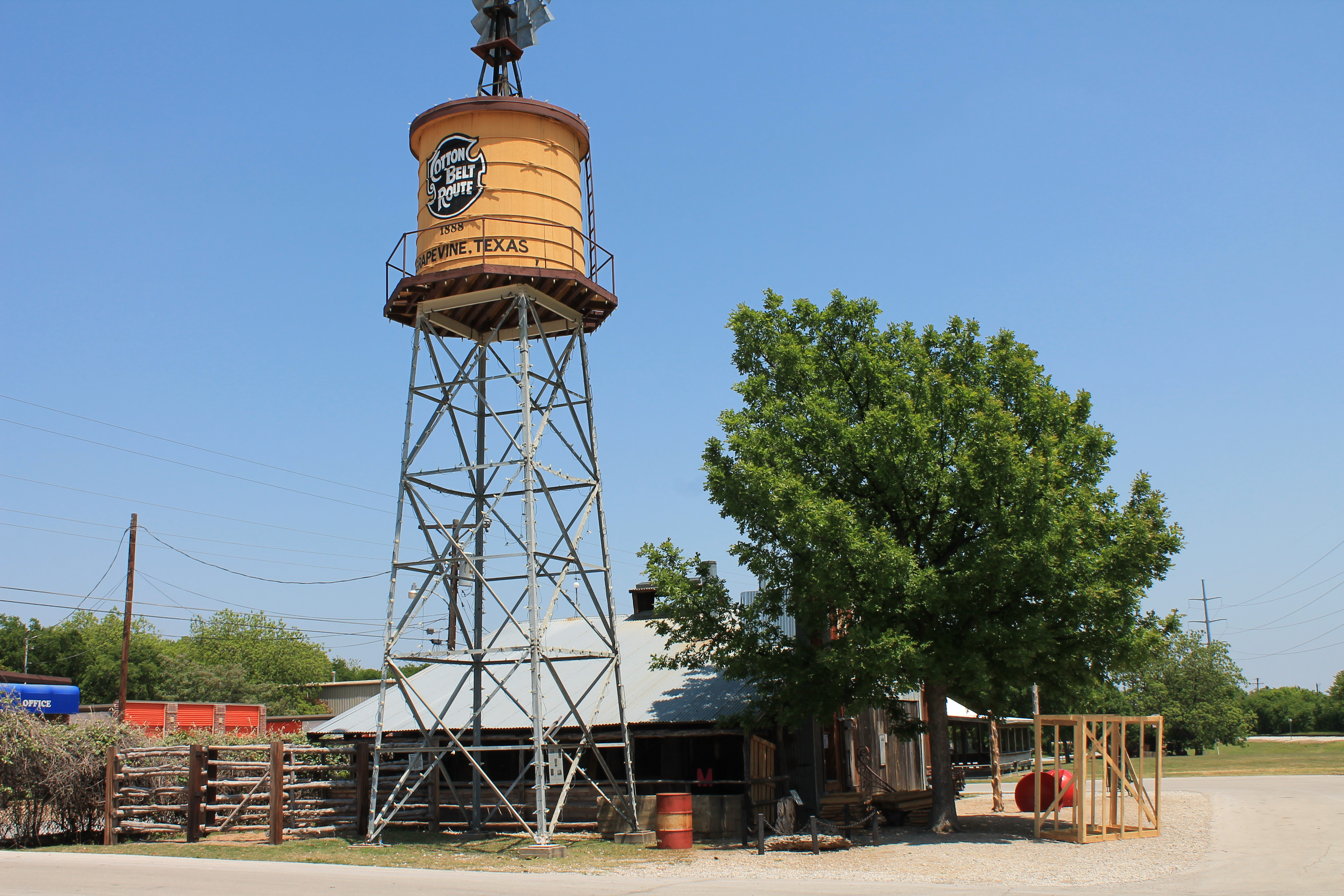

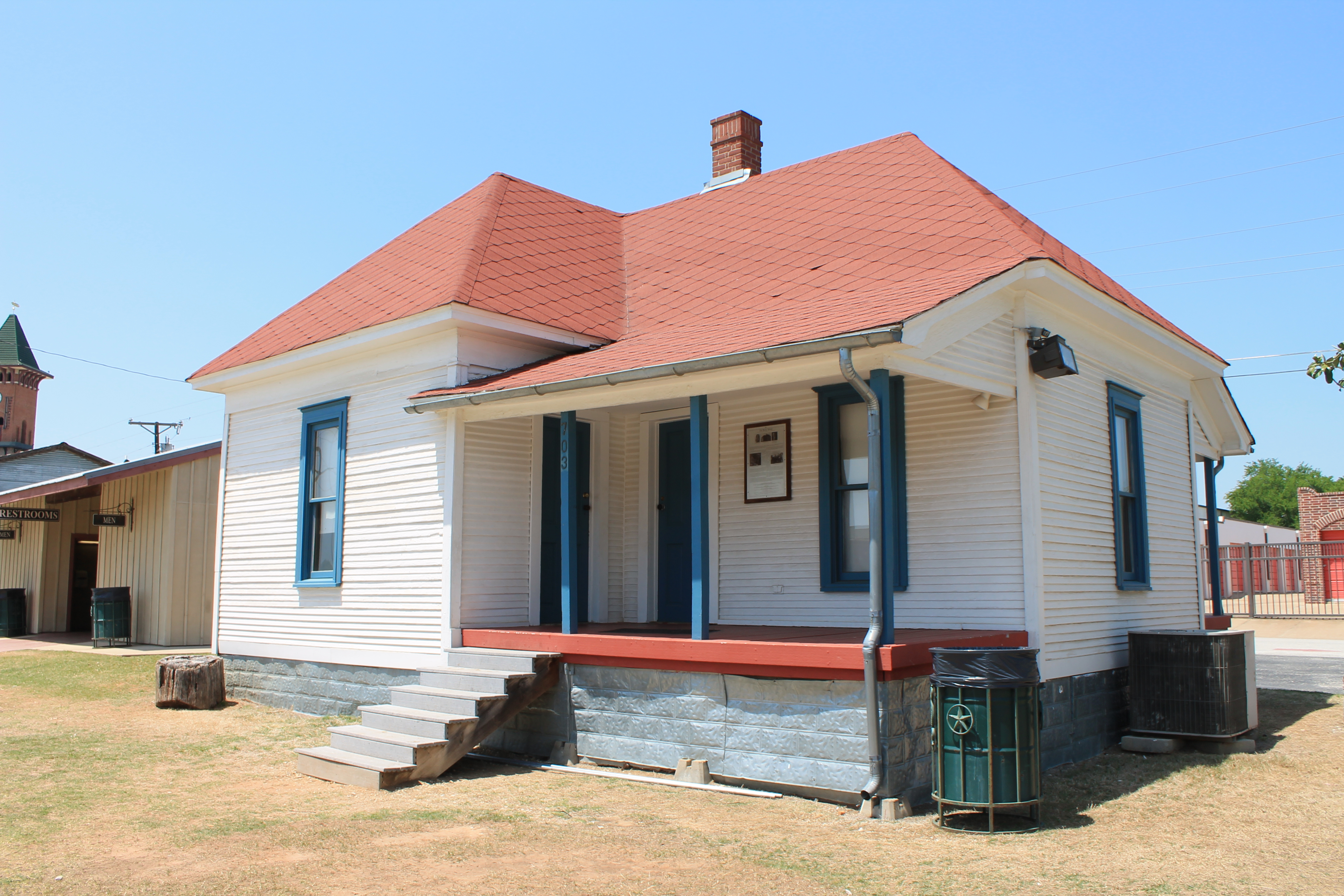

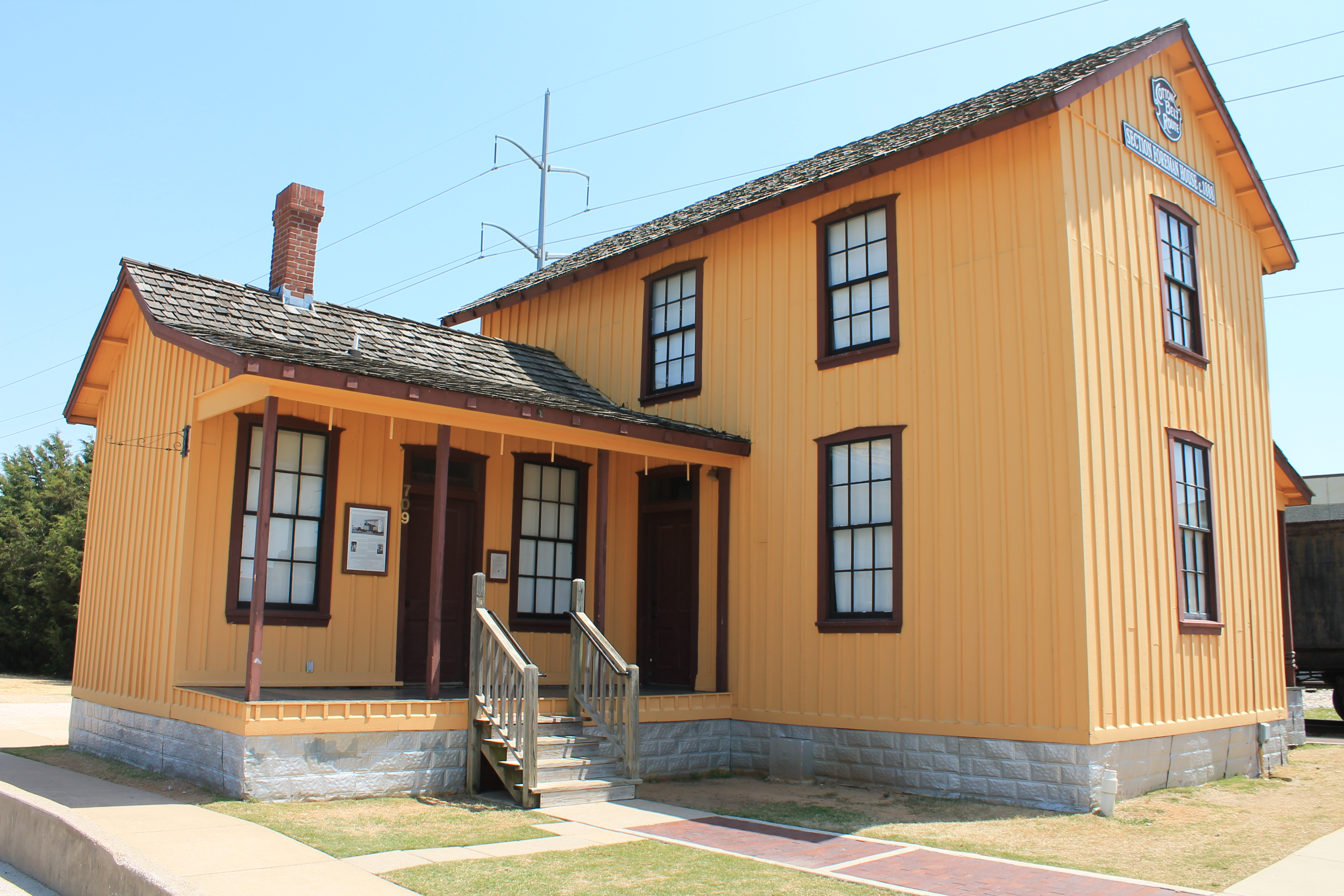

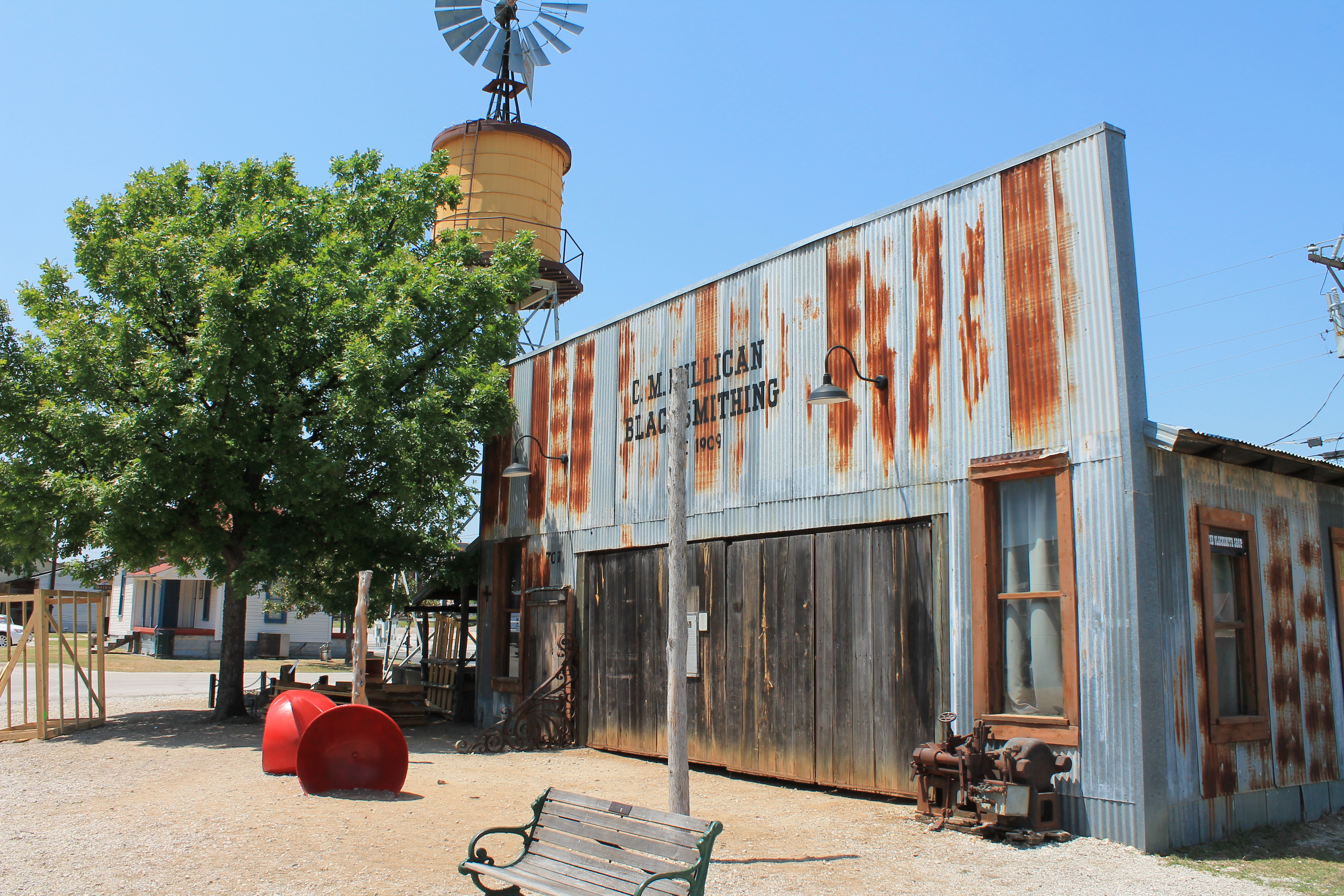

== See also ==
- National Register of Historic Places listings in Tarrant County, Texas
