= Nick Leckey =

American football player (born 1982)

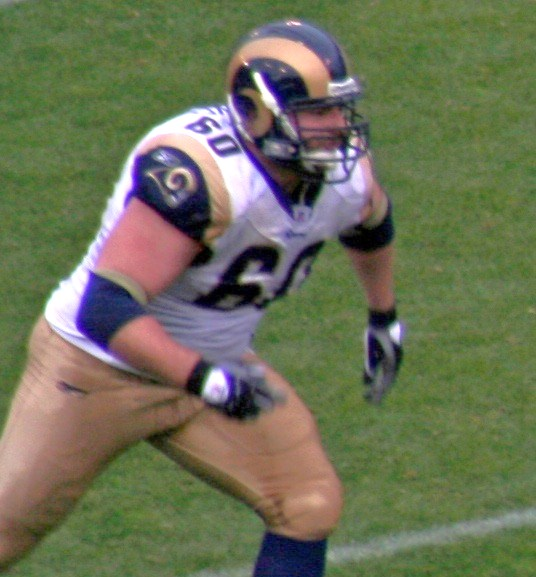

No. 60
- Position: Center

Personal information
- Born: March 12, 1982 (age 44); Dallas County, Texas, U.S.
- Listed height: 6 ft 3 in (1.91 m)
- Listed weight: 291 lb (132 kg)

Career information
- High school: Grapevine (Grapevine, Texas)
- College: Kansas State
- NFL draft: 2004: 6th round, 167th overall pick

Career history
- Arizona Cardinals (2004–2007); St. Louis Rams (2007–2008); New Orleans Saints (2009)

Awards and highlights
- Super Bowl champion (XLIV); First-team All-American (2003); 2× First-team All-Big 12 (2002, 2003); Third-team All-Big 12 (2001)

Career NFL statistics
- Games played: 65
- Games started: 32
- Fumble recoveries: 1
- Stats at Pro Football Reference

Nicholas Nathan Leckey (born March 12, 1982) is an American former professional football player who was a center in the National Football League (NFL). He played college football for the Kansas State Wildcats and was selected by the Arizona Cardinals in the sixth round of the 2004 NFL draft.

Leckey also played for the St. Louis Rams and New Orleans Saints.

== Early life ==
Leckey attended Grapevine High School in Grapevine, Texas and was a letterwinner in football and wrestling. In football, he was a three-year starter. In wrestling, he won the state championship as a senior. Leckey graduated from Grapevine High School in 2000.

== College career ==
Leckey played college football at Kansas State University where during his career, he did not allow a sack. He majored in hotel/restaurant management. He began his career at guard before switching to center. He started 41 consecutive games. He earned first-team All-American honors from ESPN and Sports Illustrated as a senior. Also earned consensus All-Big 12 first-team choice and named Kansas State's Offensive Lineman of the Year.

He was a finalist for the Rimington Trophy, which eventually went to Jake Grove of Virginia Tech.

== Professional career ==
=== Arizona Cardinals ===
Leckey was selected by the Arizona Cardinals in the sixth round (167th overall) in the 2004 NFL draft. He made his NFL debut at the St. Louis Rams on September 12. During his time at the Cardinals, he played in 44 games making 20 starts.

=== St. Louis Rams ===
Leckey was signed by the St. Louis Rams as a free agent on June 6, 2007. He played in three games for the team in 2007 and started all 10 games in which he appeared in 2008.

=== New Orleans Saints ===
Leckey signed a one-year contract with the New Orleans Saints as an unrestricted free agent on March 17, 2009. He was waived on September 26 to make room for Chase Daniel who was signed off the practice squad. He was re-signed by the Saints on September 29. Leckey played in eight regular season games and all three postseason games in 2009, mostly on special teams with some work at center.

Leckey was re-signed by the Saints on March 7, 2010. Leckey was released by New Orleans on September 4.

== Personal life ==
Leckey is married to Erin Kathleen Leckey. After retiring from football, he returned to Kansas State and received his degree in hotel and restaurant management in December 2012.
