= Grapevine High School =

Location
- 3223 Mustang Drive; Grapevine, Tarrant County, Texas 76051; United States
- 32°54′54″N 97°07′11″W

Information
- School type: Public, high school
- Motto: Where Tradition Begins
- Opened: April 8, 1952; 74 years ago
- School district: Grapevine-Colleyville I.S.D.
- Principal: Alex Fingers
- Teaching staff: 125.50 (FTE)
- Grades: 9–12
- Enrollment: 1,749 (2023–2024)
- Student to teacher ratio: 13.94
- Colors: Red; Royal blue White
- Mascot: Mustangs
- Website: ghs.gcisd.net

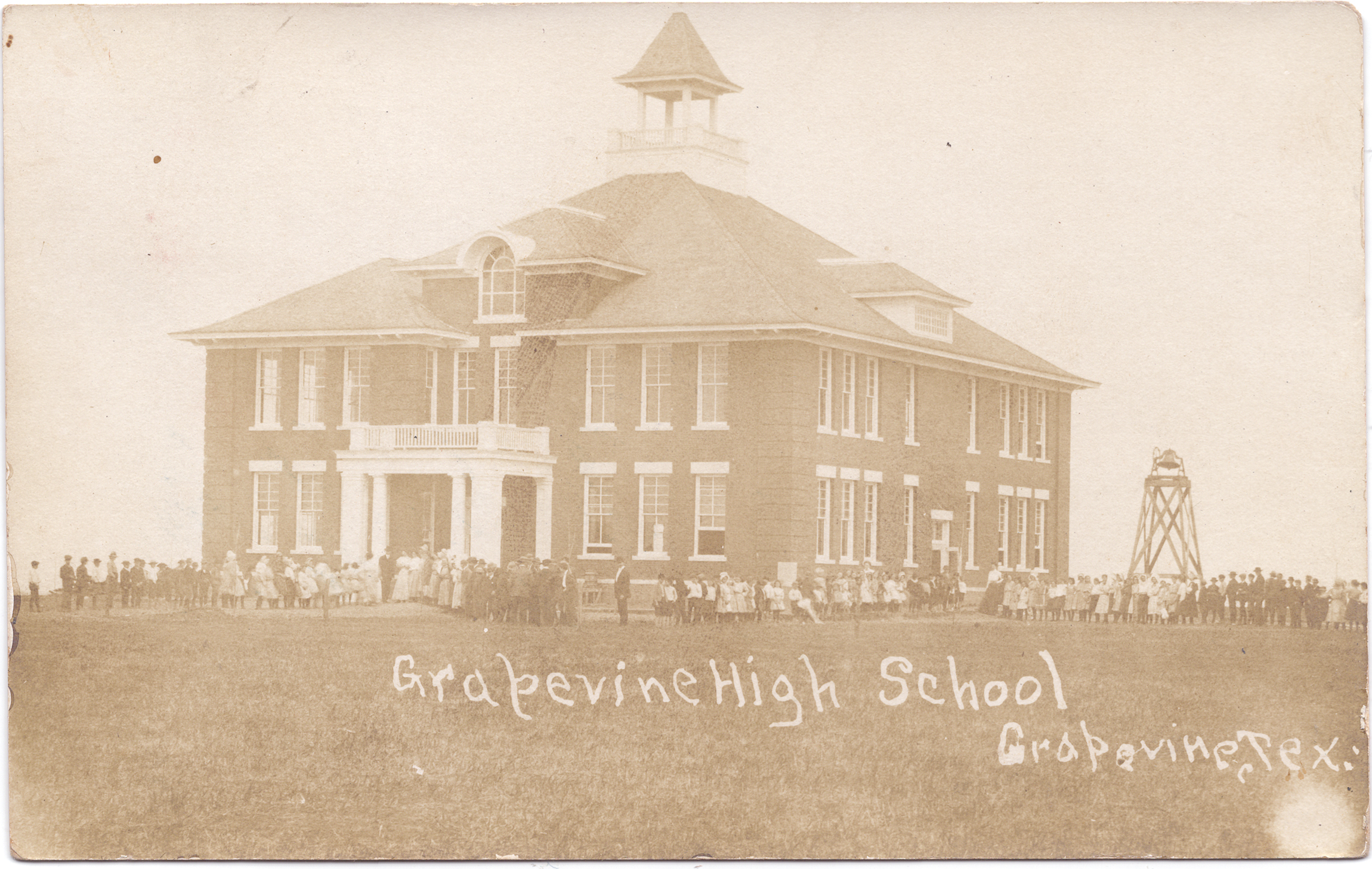
Postcard of Grapevine High School, 1909

Grapevine High School is a public high school located in the far northeast portion of Tarrant County in the city of Grapevine, Texas (USA). It is part of the Grapevine-Colleyville Independent School District.

Its attendance boundary includes sections of Grapevine, Colleyville, Hurst, and Southlake.

In 2005, Grapevine was ranked #100 of the top 100 high schools in the United States of America by Newsweek magazine, and was named a 1999–2000 National Blue Ribbon School.

Students come from Cross Timbers Middle School, other portions of Colleyville Middle School and portion of Grapevine Middle School. Although Grapevine High School is in Grapevine, only half of the student body lives in Grapevine. The other half lives in Colleyville.

== Notable alumni ==
- Bryce Avary, musician
- Richard Bartel, NFL player
- Alan Bowman, college football quarterback
- Jack Brewer, NFL player
- Colt David, CFL football player
- Jenna Dewan, actress
- David Fry, MLB player
- Chip Gaines, television personality
- Dasan Hill, MLB player
- Norah Jones, musician
- Nick Leckey, NFL player
- Demi Lovato, singer-songwriter and actress
- Post Malone, singer-songwriter
- Henry Melton, NFL player
- Ali Michael, model
- Shea Salinas, MLS player
- Guy Snodgrass, TOPGUN Instructor
- Cody Spencer, NFL player
- Josh Venable, radio DJ
