= Guy Snodgrass =

American government official (born 1976)

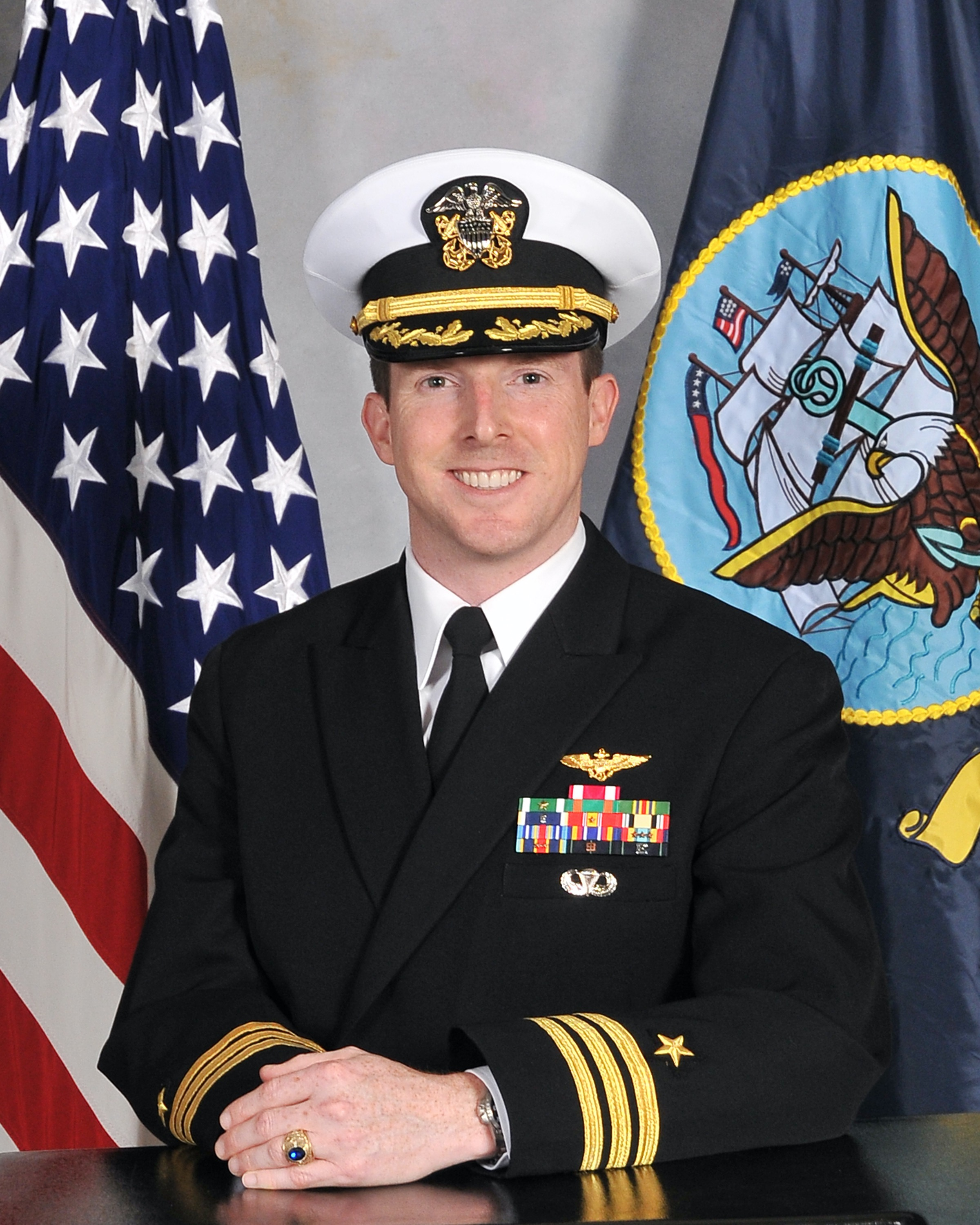

Chief Speechwriter, Communications Director United States Secretary of Defense
- In office April 2017 – August 2018
- President: Donald Trump
- Preceded by: Justin Mikolay

Executive Assistant to Commander Naval Air Force Atlantic
- In office January 2017 – April 2017
- President: Barack Obama; Donald Trump

Commanding Officer of VFA-195
- In office 2015 – December 2016
- President: Barack Obama

Personal details
- Born: Colleyville, Texas, U.S.
- Education: United States Naval Academy (BS); Massachusetts Institute of Technology (MS); United States Naval War College (MA)
- Nickname: "Bus" (callsign)

Military service
- Allegiance: United States
- Branch/service: United States Navy
- Years of service: 1998–2018
- Rank: Commander
- Commands: Strike Fighter Squadron 195 (VFA-195)
- Battles/wars: Operation Iraqi Freedom
- Awards: Defense Superior Service Medal; Meritorious Service Medal Air Medal Navy Commendation Medal (4) Navy and Marine Corps Achievement Medal

Guy Snodgrass is a retired American naval aviator, TOPGUN graduate and instructor, who served as Jim Mattis's speechwriter and chief of communications during his time as Secretary of Defense. His book Holding the Line: Inside Trump's Pentagon with Secretary Mattis was released in October 2019. The book details key decisions and moments during Mattis's time as Secretary of Defense and provides the author's first-hand look into the relationship between Mattis and Trump, the Pentagon, The White House, and American national security decision making.

== Early life ==
A native of Colleyville, Texas, Guy Snodgrass attended Grapevine High School. He graduated with honors from the U.S. Naval Academy in 1998 with a Bachelor of Science degree in Computer Science. Immediately following graduation, he attended the Massachusetts Institute of Technology, where he earned two master's degrees (master's thesis was "Benchmark Test Problem for Measuring Anomalous Dissipation in Shock Hydrodynamics Simulations," conducted with Los Alamos National Laboratory).

== Military career ==
A career F/A-18 Hornet pilot, Snodgrass flew combat sorties from an aircraft carrier in the Persian Gulf in direct support of Operation Iraqi Freedom during his first tour of duty with Strike Fighter Squadron 131. Following this tour, he was selected to serve as a TOPGUN instructor at the US Navy Strike Fighter Weapons School located in Fallon, Nevada. From 2008 to 2011, he served as a training officer and department head with Strike Fighter Squadron 102 based at Naval Air Facility Atsugi, located in Ayase, Japan. During this tour, Snodgrass was selected as the 2008 Strike Fighter Wing Pacific Pilot of the Year, the 2009 Strike Fighter Wing Pacific Tactical Aviator of the Year, and the 2010 Naval Air Forces Michael G. Hoff Attack Aviator of the Year. He also received the 2010 Naval Air Forces Pacific Navy and Marine Corps Leadership Award. He was also selected as a national finalist for the White House Fellows program.

In 2011, Snodgrass attended the United States Naval War College located in Newport, Rhode Island, earning a Master of Arts in national security and strategic studies.

Snodgrass was subsequently selected for the U.S. Navy's 2014 Quadrennial Defense Review team, where he assessed U.S. Navy force structure and made recommendations regarding future fleet design. During this tour, he was selected to serve as speechwriter to Chief of Naval Operations Admiral Jonathan Greenert in the Pentagon in 2012.

In the autumn 2014 edition of the Naval War College Review, Snodgrass published "Keep a Weather Eye on the Horizon: A Navy Officer Retention Study." The study and associated writings grabbed the attention of junior officers and senior leaders across the Navy. Snodgrass's findings and assertions changed the retention conversation and helped launch early talent management conversations in the Navy and across DoD.

Following his Pentagon tour, Snodgrass returned overseas to Naval Air Facility Atsugi, Japan, to assume command of Strike Fighter Squadron 195. During this time, he created the 2015 Far East Commanders Conference, later renamed to the Pacific Warfighter Symposium, when it became hosted by the United States Pacific Fleet in Pearl Harbor, Hawaii. He also created and hosted the Benkyoukai Initiative, a partnership between US Navy fighter squadrons based in Japan and the Japanese Air Self Defense Force to exchange knowledge and practice aerial war fighting. His command subsequently earned the US Navy's Battle Efficiency award, presented annually to the finest US Navy F/A-18 squadron in the Western Hemisphere.

Snodgrass served as Chief Speechwriter and Director of Communications to Secretary of Defense James Mattis from April 2017 to August 2018. He is the author of the Department of Defense's officially released Unclassified Summary of the 2018 National Defense Strategy. His promotion to captain was authorized in June 2018, but he chose to retire from the Navy rather than accept a new assignment.

=== Holding the Line ===
Released in October 2019, Holding the Line: Inside the Pentagon With General Mattis is a book written based on Snodgrass's time as Mattis's speechwriter and Chief of Communications. It was submitted to the Pentagon's censors in April 2019. Snodgrass's manuscript was initially stonewalled and delayed during the Pentagon review process, leading him to take legal action against his former employer. He won a complex First Amendment fight concerning the release of a book regarding his time at the Pentagon. While the book contains no classified information, it was being held up because of the military's discomfort with the description of non-classified discussions in Pentagon conference rooms. In August 2019, Snodgrass sued the Pentagon, alleging that they had baselessly stalled the release of his book, trying to delay it so that Mattis's own book would be released first. Released emails from the suit show that the Pentagon told Snodgrass, "Senior leaders have directed my office to hold our response pending the outcome of high level discussions," The Pentagon released the book for publication in September 2019, a week after Mattis's book release.

== Civilian career ==
Snodgrass is the chief executive officer of Defense Analytics, a strategic advisory firm in Washington, D.C., and is a regular contributor to the Washington Post, Politico, Fox Business, CNN, USA Today, and elsewhere. He is a member of numerous professional societies and organizations including the U.S. Naval Institute Board of Directors.

== Personal life ==
Snodgrass is the son of Marvin David Snodgrass and Sherrilee Walker Snodgrass. He lives in the Washington metropolitan area.

== Books ==
- Holding the Line: Inside Trump's Pentagon with Secretary Mattis. Sentinel, Oct. 2019.
- TOPGUN'S TOP 10: Leadership Lessons from the Cockpit. Center Street, Sept. 2020.

== See also ==
- Office of the Secretary of Defense
- Assistant to the Secretary of Defense for Public Affairs
- The Room Where It Happened
