= Colleyville, Texas =

- City
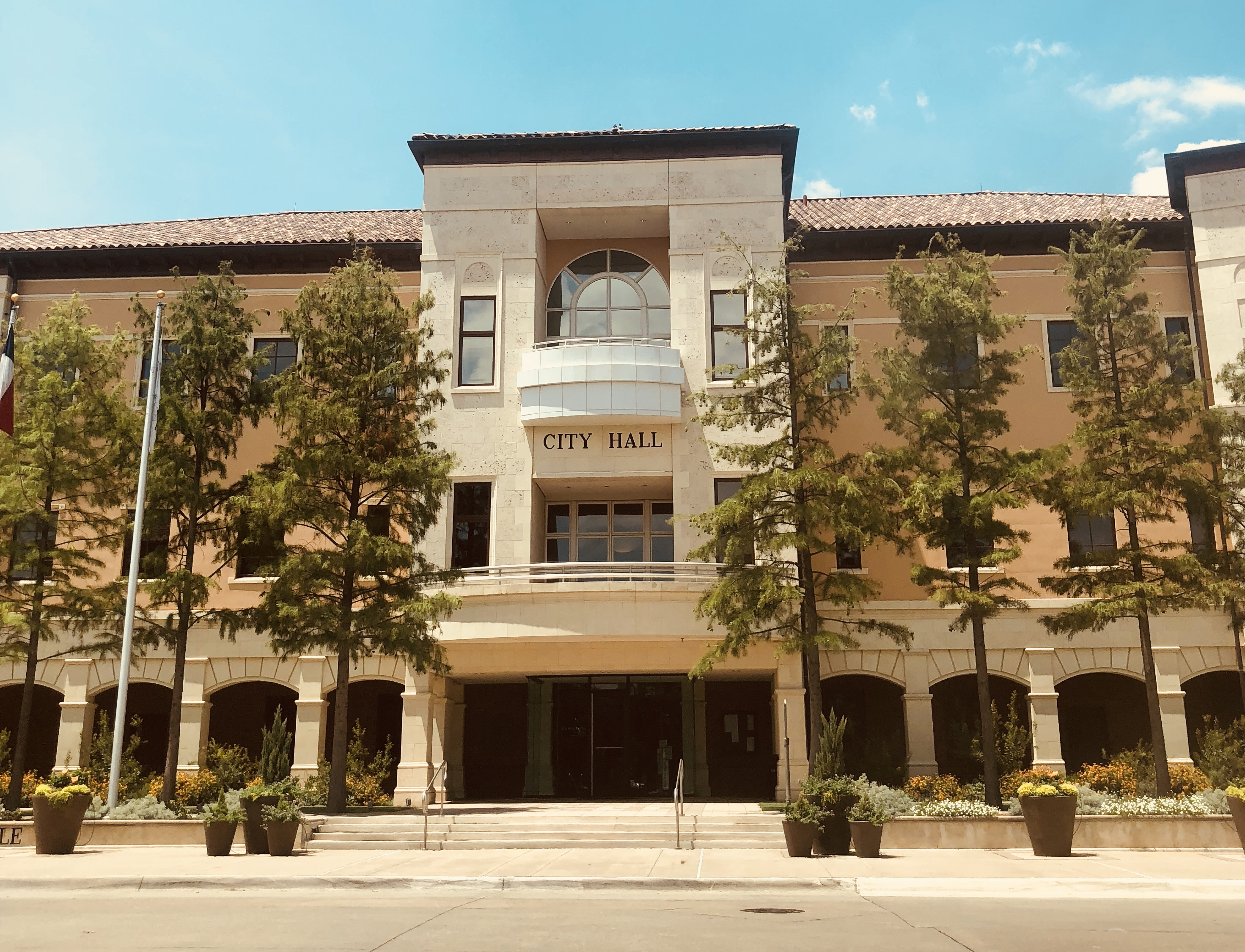
- Colleyville City Hall

- Location of Colleyville in Tarrant County, Texas
- Coordinates: 32°52′50″N 97°08′50″W
- Country: United States
- State: Texas
- County: Tarrant

Government
  - Type: Council-Manager

Area
  - Total: 13.22 sq mi (34.24 km^{2})
  - Land: 13.12 sq mi (33.98 km^{2})
  - Water: 0.10 sq mi (0.26 km^{2}) 0.08%
- Elevation: 614 ft (187 m)

Population (2020)
  - Total: 26,057
  - Density: 1,986/sq mi (766.8/km^{2})
- Time zone: UTC−6 (CST)
  - Summer (DST): UTC−5 (CDT)
- ZIP Code: 76034
- Area codes: 817, 682
- FIPS code: 48-15988
- GNIS feature ID: 2410194
- Website: colleyville.com

Colleyville is a city in northeastern Tarrant County, Texas, United States, centrally located in the Dallas–Fort Worth metroplex. A wealthy suburb of the Dallas/Fort Worth area, Colleyville was originally a small farm town in the 19th century. The population was 26,057 at the 2020 census.

== History ==
Emerging from a number of small, rural settlements along the Cotton Belt Route, Colleyville was originally known as Bransford when Dr. Lilburn Howard Colley settled there in 1880. He was a prominent area physician and a veteran of the Union Army. In 1914, when Walter G. Couch opened a grocery store near Dr. Colley's home, the community was renamed Colleyville in his honor.

On January 15, 2022, a hostage crisis occurred at Congregation Beth Israel, a synagogue in Colleyville. Four hostages were held for a number of hours before police shot and killed the perpetrator. The FBI said it was investigating the incident as a "federal hate crime" and an "act of terrorism". A movie about the event had been made and shown at the docaviv international film festival.

== Geography ==
According to the United States Census Bureau, the city has a total area of 13.1 square miles (34 km^{2}), with approximately 0.08% of its area as water.

== Demographics ==
Historical population
Census	Pop.	Note	%±
1960	1,491		—
1970	3,342		124.1%
1980	6,700		100.5%
1990	12,724		89.9%
2000	19,636		54.3%
2010	22,807		16.1%
2020	26,057		14.3%
2021 (est.)	25,986		−0.3%
U.S. Decennial Census

=== 2020 census ===
As of the 2020 census, Colleyville had a population of 26,057, 9,096 households, and 8,084 families residing in the city. The median age was 48.3 years, 22.4% of residents were under the age of 18, and 19.4% of residents were 65 years of age or older. For every 100 females there were 98.4 males, and for every 100 females age 18 and over there were 96.2 males age 18 and over.

There were 9,096 households in Colleyville, of which 34.8% had children under the age of 18 living in them. Of all households, 80.6% were married-couple households, 6.7% were households with a male householder and no spouse or partner present, and 10.9% were households with a female householder and no spouse or partner present. About 10.2% of all households were made up of individuals and 5.4% had someone living alone who was 65 years of age or older.

There were 9,395 housing units, of which 3.2% were vacant. Among occupied housing units, 95.8% were owner-occupied and 4.2% were renter-occupied. The homeowner vacancy rate was 1.3% and the rental vacancy rate was 6.6%.

100.0% of residents lived in urban areas, while 0% lived in rural areas.

Racial composition as of the 2020 census (NH = Non-Hispanic) (Note: Note: the US Census treats Hispanic/Latino as an ethnic category. This table excludes Latinos from the racial categories and assigns them to a separate category. Hispanics/Latinos can be of any race.)
Race	Number	Percent
White	20,095	77.1%
Black or African American	639	2.5%
American Indian and Alaska Native	103	0.4%
Asian	2,601	10.0%
Native Hawaiian and Other Pacific Islander	20	0.1%
Some other race	364	1.4%
Two or more races	2,235	8.6%
Hispanic or Latino (of any race)	1,857	7.1%

== Economy ==
=== Top employers ===
Ranking	Employer	Number of Employees
1	Grapevine Colleyville ISD	611
2	Market Street	345
3	Lifetime Fitness	250
4	City of Colleyville	206
5	Covenant Christian Academy	130
6	Whole Foods Market	125
7	Albertsons	118
8	La Hacienda Ranch	100
9	Walmart Neighborhood Market	72
10	US Memory Care	60

== Government ==
=== Municipal government ===
Colleyville uses a council–manager government, consisting of an elected city council composed of the mayor and six at-large councilmembers and a city manager appointed by the council. The current city manager is Jerry Ducay.

The city is a voluntary member of the North Central Texas Council of Governments.

==== Colleyville City Council ====
Office	Name	Term Expires
Mayor	Bobby Lindamood	May 2028
City Council, Place 1	Brandi Elder	May 2028
City Council, Place 2	Mark Alphonso	May 2028
City Council, Place 3	Scotty Richardson	May 2029
City Council, Place 4	Ben Graves	May 2029
City Council, Place 5	Kimberly Holt Gunderson	May 2027
City Council, Place 6	Tim Raine	May 2027

==== 2017 financial report ====
According to the city's 2017 Comprehensive Annual Financial Report, the city's various funds had $42.4 million in revenues, $35.1 million in expenditures, $221.5 million in total assets, $19.5 million in total liabilities, and $57.5 million in cash and investments.

=== Politics ===
Colleyville, located in the conservative stronghold of northeastern Tarrant County, votes overwhelmingly Republican in all elections, as do most suburban cities in the Dallas–Fort Worth metroplex.

==== Tarrant County officials ====
Office	Name	Party
County Commissioner, Precinct 3	Gary Fickes	Republican
Justice of the Peace, Precinct 3	Bill Brandt	Republican
Constable, Precinct 3	Darrell Huffman	Republican

==== Texas Legislature ====
Office	Name	Party
Texas State Representative, District 92	Jeff Cason	Republican
Texas State Representative, District 98	Giovanni Capriglione	Republican
Texas State Senator, District 9	Kelly Hancock	Republican
Texas State Senator, District 10	Beverly Powell	Democratic

The city almost entirely lies within the boundaries of Texas House District 98 and Texas Senate District 10, with a few houses lying within Texas House District 92 and Texas Senate District 9.

==== Texas State Board of Education ====
Office	Name	Party
State Board of Education Member, District 11	Patricia "Pat" Hardy	Republican

==== United States House of Representatives ====
Office	Name	Party
United States Representative, Texas's 24th congressional district	Beth Van Duyne	Republican

== Education ==
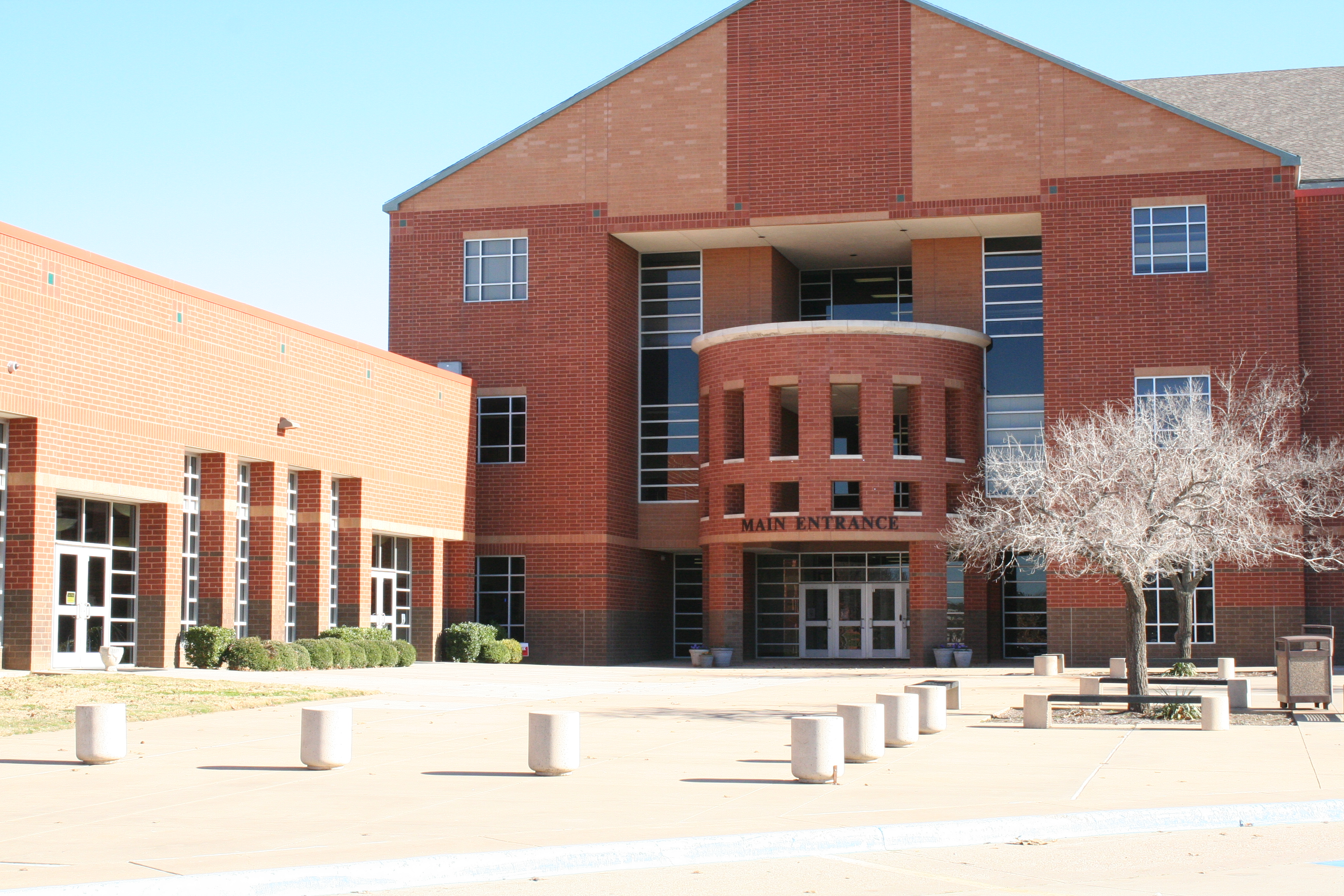
Colleyville Heritage High School

Grapevine-Colleyville Independent School District serves most of the city. The district operates eleven elementary schools (pre-kindergarten through 5th grade), four middle schools (6th–8th grades), and two high schools (9th–12th grades). Colleyville Heritage High School and Grapevine High School both draw students from different areas of Colleyville.

Northwestern Colleyville lies inside Keller Independent School District, which maintains one campus within the city. Birdville Independent School District, Carroll Independent School District, and Hurst-Euless-Bedford Independent School District also serve small portions of Colleyville.

Colleyville Covenant Christian Academy is a private religious school serving pre-kindergarten through 12th grade and is a fully accredited member of the Texas Association of Private and Parochial Schools.

== Transportation ==
=== Roads and highways ===
Two Texas state highways run through city limits. Texas State Highway 121 runs along a portion of the eastern edge of Colleyville, while Texas State Highway 26, also known as Colleyville Boulevard or Grapevine Highway, bisects the city, running southwest to northeast. The speed limit on every road in the city is 30 or 35 mph, excluding the 45 mph speed limit on Highway 26 set by TxDOT.

=== Rail ===
The Grapevine Vintage Railroad runs through the city along the former Cotton Belt Route right-of-way, offering rides on vintage locomotives from downtown Grapevine to downtown Fort Worth. Commuter rail service began on January 10, 2019, with the introduction of TEXRail, offering service from Fort Worth to DFW Airport through Northeast Tarrant County. Due to immense opposition from the Colleyville City Council and residents, the commuter train does not stop in Colleyville, so the closest stations are the North Richland Hills/Smithfield station to the west and the Grapevine station to the east.

=== Airports ===
Two major airports serve passengers in the Metroplex. Dallas/Fort Worth International Airport, one of the busiest airports in the world, provides airline services to over 200 destinations. American Airlines, headquartered nearby in Fort Worth, maintains its largest hub at DFW. Colleyville has experienced significant population growth because of its proximity to the airport. Dallas Love Field, in Northwest Dallas, is home to the headquarters of Southwest Airlines and serves as a focus city for the airline.

=== Trails ===
The Cotton Belt Trail is an eleven-mile bicyclist and pedestrian trail that lies parallel to the former Cotton Belt Route railroad through Grapevine, Colleyville, Hurst, and North Richland Hills, with 3.4 miles running through Colleyville. The Colleyville Nature Center also provides a 1.25 mile hiking trail.

== Notable people ==
- Bryce Avary, The Rocket Summer
- Konni Burton, former Texas State Senator and businesswoman
- Chad Campbell, PGA golfer
- Greg Chalmers, PGA golfer
- Maxx Crosby, NFL defensive end for Las Vegas Raiders
- Rusty Greer, former MLB left fielder for Texas Rangers
- Josh Hamilton, Texas Rangers outfielder
- Ryan Lawler, racing driver
- Demi Lovato, actress and singer
- Frank Lucchesi, Major League Baseball manager
- Hunter Mahan, PGA golfer
- Katie Meili, Olympic swimmer
- Rafael Palmeiro, former Texas Rangers and Baltimore Orioles first baseman
- Ryan Palmer, PGA Tour golfer
- Christian Ponder, Minnesota Vikings quarterback, alumnus of CHHS
- John Rollins, PGA golfer
- AJ Smith-Shawver MLB pitcher for the Atlanta Braves organization
- Bobby Witt Jr., MLB shortstop for Kansas City Royals
