= Mid-Cities =

Suburbs between Dallas and Fort Worth, Texas

The Mid-Cities is a suburban region filling the 30-mile (48 km) span between Dallas and Fort Worth. These communities include the cities of Arlington, Bedford, Colleyville, Coppell, Euless, Grand Prairie, Grapevine, Haltom City, Hurst, Irving, Keller, Mansfield, North Richland Hills, Richland Hills, Southlake, and Watauga.

== Cities ==
The list features cities that are considered part of the Mid-Cities. Most of these communities are predominantly in Tarrant County (county seat Fort Worth), with minor exceptions lying in Dallas County (county seat Dallas) and Denton County (county seat Denton). Some of these communities with a population over 100,000 are considered principal or major cities, despite being between Dallas and Fort Worth.

Tarrant County:

- Arlington
- Bedford
- Colleyville
- Dalworthington Gardens
- Euless
- Grapevine (minor portions in Dallas and Denton counties)
- Haltom City
- Hurst
- Mansfield
- North Richland Hills
- Pantego
- Richland Hills
- Southlake (minor portion in Denton County)
- Watauga

Dallas County:

- Coppell
- Grand Prairie (small portion in Tarrant County)
- Irving

Denton County:

- Flower Mound (minor portion in Tarrant County)
- Keller
- Lewisville

== Transportation ==
=== Airports ===
- DFW International Airport
- Grand Prairie Municipal Airport
- Arlington Municipal Airport

=== Highways ===
- I-20
- I-820
- Tom Landry Highway
- LBJ Freeway
- Pres. George Bush Turnpike
- John Carpenter Freeway
- SH 121
- SH 161
- SH 183 - Airport Freeway
- SH 360

=== Rail ===
- Trinity Railway Express
- TEXRail
- DART Orange Line

== Major shopping centers ==
- Grapevine Mills
- Irving Mall
- North East Mall
- The Parks Mall at Arlington
- Southlake Town Center

== Entertainment ==
=== Major sports ===
Arlington hosts two major teams. The Texas Rangers baseball team played at Arlington Stadium from 1972 to 1993, at Globe Life Park in Arlington from 1994 to 2019, and has competed at Globe Life Field since 2020. Meanwhile, the Dallas Cowboys football team played at the Texas Stadium in Irving from 1971 to 2008 and has been at the AT&T Stadium in Arlington since 2009.

The International Bowling Campus, which houses the United States Bowling Congress, International Bowling Museum and the International Bowling Hall of Fame, is also located in Arlington.

The Four Seasons Resort and Club Dallas at Las Colinas hosts the Byron Nelson Championship, an annual PGA Tour golf tournament. The Las Colinas Country Club hosts the LPGA Tour's Volunteers of America Texas Shootout each spring as well.

Other sports teams in the Mid-Cities are:

- Grand Prairie AirHogs
- Lone Star Brahmas
- Texas Jr. Brahmas
- Dallas Derby Devils
- Vitesse Dallas

=== Amusement parks ===
- Six Flags
- Hurricane Harbor
- NRH2O
- Great Wolf Lodge
- Epic Waters Indoor Water Park

=== Notable museums ===
- Ripley's Believe It or Not!
- National Medal of Honor Museum

=== Gambling ===
- Lone Star Park

=== Venues ===
- Texas Trust CU Theatre at Grand Prairie
- Irving Convention Center at Las Colinas
- Toyota Music Factory

== Education ==
=== Higher education ===
- Arlington Baptist College
- Dallas Christian College (Farmers Branch)
- Dallas College
  - Brookhaven Campus (Farmers Branch)
  - North Lake Campus (Irving)
- Tarrant County College
  - Northeast campus (Hurst)
  - Southeast campus (Arlington)
- Texas Tech University Health Sciences Center (Mansfield)
- University of Dallas (Irving)
- University of Texas at Arlington

=== High schools ===
This list features high schools that serve the Mid-Cities communities. Some of the campuses' city limits are within either Dallas or Fort Worth, examples such as Keller ISD have a significant amount of their high school campuses predominantly in Fort Worth city limits, despite being based in Keller.

- Arlington ISD
  - Arlington High School
  - Bowie High School (Arlington, TX)
  - Lamar High School (Arlington, Texas)
  - Martin High School (Arlington, TX)
  - Sam Houston High School (Arlington, Texas)
  - Seguin High School (Arlington, Texas)
- Birdville ISD
  - Birdville High School (North Richland Hills, TX)
  - Haltom High School
  - Richland High School
- Carroll ISD
  - Carroll High School (Southlake, TX)
- Carrollton-Farmers Branch ISD
  - Ranchview High School(Irving Texas)
- Coppell ISD
  - Coppell High School
- Grand Prairie ISD
  - Grand Prairie High School
  - South Grand Prairie High School
  - Dubiski Career High School
- Grapevine-Colleyville ISD
  - Colleyville Heritage High School
  - Grapevine High School
- Hurst-Euless-Bedford ISD
  - L. D. Bell High School (Hurst, TX)
  - Trinity High School
- Irving ISD
  - Irving High School
  - Jack E. Singley Academy (Irving, Texas)
  - MacArthur High School (Irving, Texas)
  - Nimitz High School (Irving, Texas)
- Keller ISD
  - Central High School (Fort Worth, TX)
  - Fossil Ridge High School (Fort Worth, TX)
  - Keller High School (Keller, Texas)
  - Timber Creek High School (Fort Worth, TX)
- Mansfield ISD
  - Mansfield High School (Mansfield, Texas)
  - Mansfield Summit High School (Arlington, Texas)
  - Mansfield Timberview High School (Arlington, Texas)
  - Mansfield Legacy High School (Mansfield, Texas)
  - Mansfield Lake Ridge High School (Mansfield, Texas)
- Northwest ISD
  - Byron Nelson High School (Trophy Club, TX)
