= Birdville Center of Technology and Advanced Learning =

Coordinates: 32.85834°N 97.232625°W

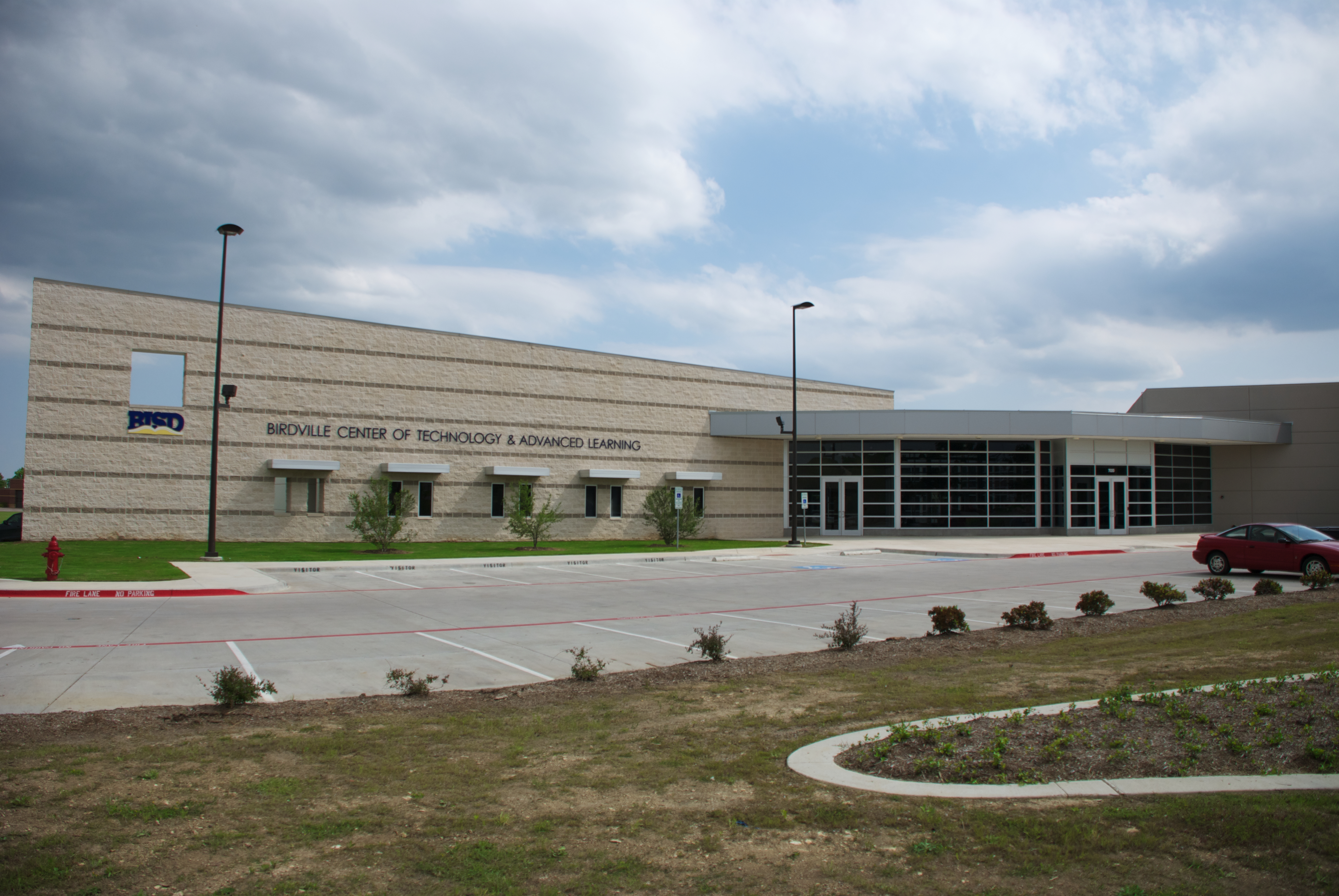

Location
- 7020 Mid Cities Blvd; North Texas; North Richland Hills, Tarrant County, Texas 76180; United States

Information
- Motto: "All students succeed in a future they create"
- Opened: 2009
- School district: Birdville Independent School District
- Superintendent: Stephen Waddell
  - Grade 9: last
  - Grade 10: 3rd
  - Grade 11: 2nd
  - Grade 12: priority
- Classes offered: Career & Technology
- Campus type: Magnet school
- Colours: Maroon, Blue & Yellow
- Slogan: N/A
- Athletics: N/A
- Nickname: BCTAL, The Tech Center
- Feeder schools: Haltom High School, Richland High School, Birdville High School
- Website: Birdville Center of Technology and Advanced Learning website

The Birdville Center of Technology and Advanced Learning (BCTAL) is a magnet school in the Birdville Independent School District, located in North Richland Hills, Texas. BCTAL offers students of Haltom High School, Richland High School, and Birdville High School courses in career and technology.

== Campus ==
The Birdville Center of Technology and Advanced Learning is located in a central location relative to its three feeder schools. It was built in 2008-2009 and officially opened to students in 2009. It was designed to provide more space for the career and technology programs to centralize most of the district's programs in one location.

== Programs ==
Programs at the campus include Media Technology, Agricultural, Pre Medical, Animal Science, Cosmetology, Automotive Technology, Construction Technology, Culinary Arts, Criminal Justice, Travel/Tourism and many others.
