= Fossil Ridge High School (Fort Worth, Texas) =

American public high school

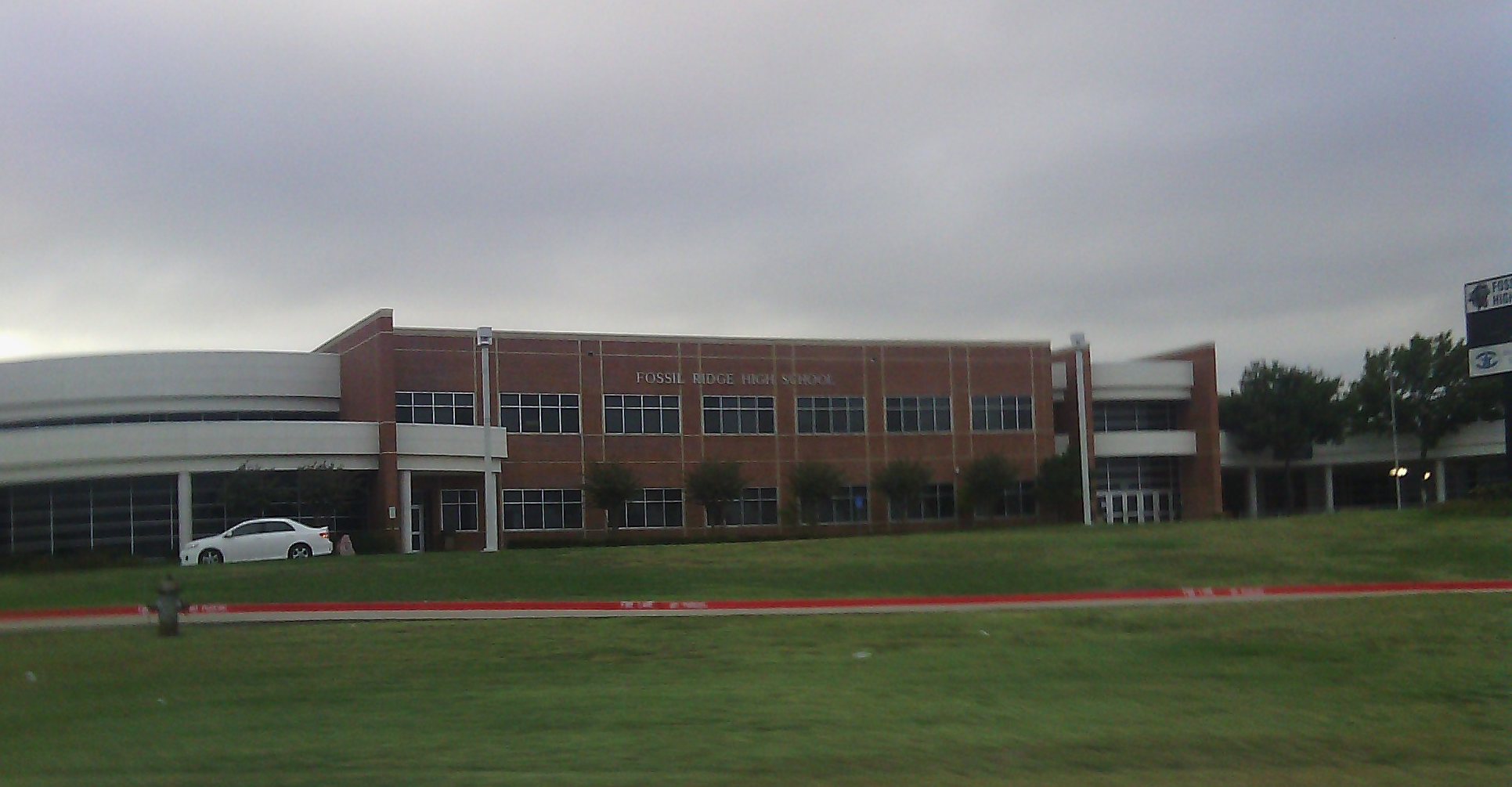

Location
- 4101 Thompson Rd; Fort Worth, TX; Tarrant County, Texas 76244; United States; 32°53′35″N 97°17′43″W

Information
- Type: Co-Educational, Public, Secondary
- Motto: It's better at the Ridge
- Established: 1995
- Sister school: Keller High School; Timber Creek High School; Central High School; Keller Learning Center
- School district: Keller Independent School District
- Superintendent: Dr. Cory Wilson
- Principal: Amanda Burruel
- Faculty: 158.13 (FTE)
- Grades: 9–12
- Enrollment: 2,140 (2024-25)
- Student to teacher ratio: 14.63
- Language: English; Spanish
- Campus type: Urban
- Colors: Black and gold
- Mascot: Panther
- Communities served: Fort Worth; Keller; Watauga; Haltom City; North Richland Hills
- Feeder schools: Fossil Hill Middle School Vista Ridge Middle School
- Renovated: 1997–2001
- Website: frhs.kellerisd.net

Fossil Ridge High School (FRHS) is an American public high school located in far north Fort Worth, Texas. It is the second high school inside the Keller Independent School District. It has two feeder middle schools: Fossil Hill Middle School and Vista Ridge Middle School graduates feed into Fossil Ridge.

According to U.S. News & World Report, Fossil Ridge High School is ranked at #5,025. In Texas, it is ranked at #496.

== Athletics ==
Sports offered at Fossil Ridge include baseball, boys and girls basketball, cheer, cross country, a drill team (Sun Dancers), football, golf, powerlifting, boys and girls soccer, softball, swimming/diving, tennis, boys and girls track, volleyball, and wrestling.

=== Football ===
Fossil Ridge currently has two freshman teams, one junior varsity team, and a varsity team. The varsity team plays at the Keller Sports Complex and sub-varsity teams play at the small stadium located at Fossil Ridge.

In 2005, Fossil Ridge went back to the playoffs for the first time since the 2002 season. Fossil Ridge went to the playoffs 6 consecutive years, 2013-2018 under Head Coach Tony Baccarini. The 2017 Season marking the first time in school history having a perfect 10-0 regular season and a district championship. Beginning with the 2014–2015 school year, Fossil Ridge has been reclassified to 6A. Following the 2023-24 School Year, Fossil Ridge was moved back down to division 5A, and remains at 5A until 2028.

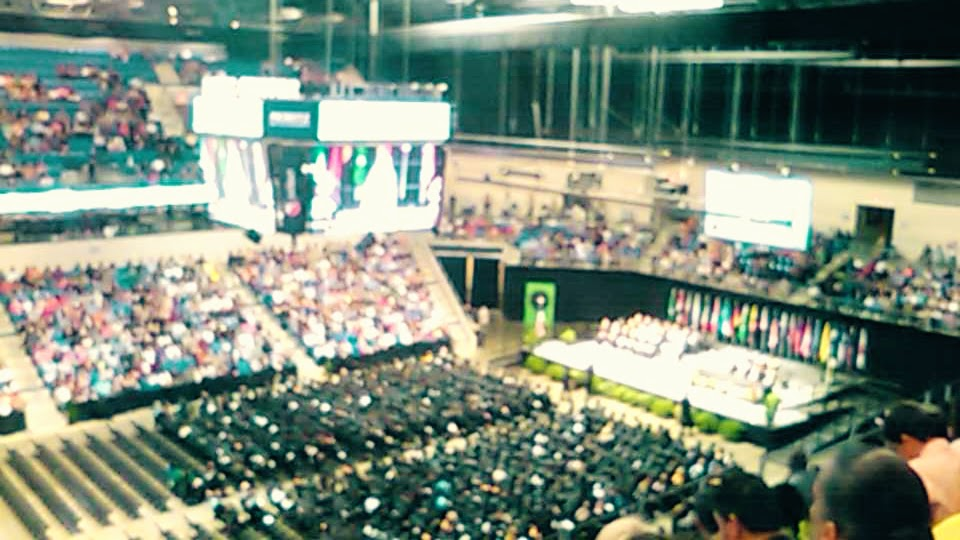
Fossil Ridge Class of 2015 Graduation ceremony at College Park Center in Arlington, Texas. (May 2015)

== Extracurricular activities ==
The school's extracurricular choices include Art Club, Asian Alliance, AVID Leadership, Black Student Alliance, Circle of Friends, Community Improvement Club, Create for Kids, ESL (English as a Second Language), FCA (Fellowship of Christian Athletes), Food For Thought, HOSA (Health Occupation Students of America), Multi Culture Association, Red Cross Club, Ridge Connected, Spanish Club, and Thespian Troupe 5584.

=== Theatre ===
- 2006 - UIL One Act Play 'The Angelina Project' is awarded Second Runner Up at the State Meet.
- 2007 - UIL One Act Play 'Gint' advances to the Regional Meet and is awarded Alternate.
- 2008 - UIL One Act Play 'Eurydice' is awarded Best Actress and First Runner Up at the State Meet.
- 2010 - UIL One Act Play 'The Shadow Box' participated in the state meet. Received multiple acting awards.
- 2025 - UIL One Act Play 'Antigone' participated in the state meet. Received multiple acting awards.

=== JROTC ===
Fossil Ridge currently has an AFJROTC program. However, the program takes place at Central High School, a neighboring school in the KISD. The program consists of participants from all 4 KISD high schools.

=== Marching Band & Color Guard ===
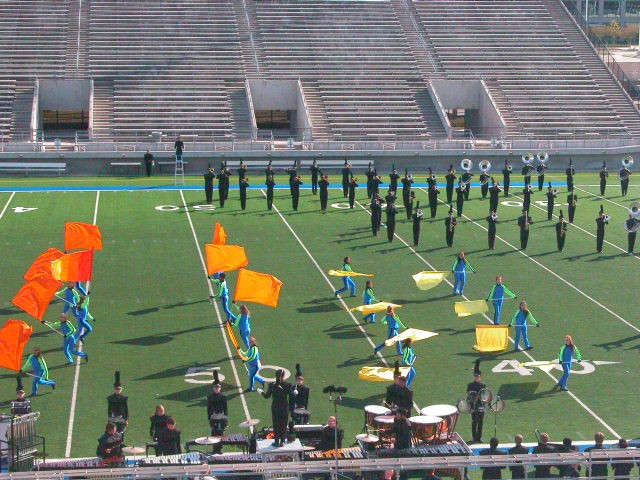
The Fossil Ridge Panther Regiment, 2005

The Fossil Ridge Panther Regiment is a marching band and color guard, currently being directed by Daniel Malacon.

The Panther Regiment has advanced to the UIL State Marching band contest five times.

- 1999 - UIL marching show 'Glorioso' advanced to state finals under director Randy Tierce, earning fourth place overall in the 4A division.
- 2002 - UIL marching show advanced to state in the 4A division under director Brian Pollard.
- 2007 - UIL marching show 'The Raven' advanced to state in the 4A division under director Mike Sisco.
- 2008 - UIL marching show 'The Queen of Sheba, Dance of the Seven Veils' advanced to state in the 4A division under director Mike Sisco.
- 2012 - UIL marching show 'Wake' advanced to state in the 5A division under director Brad Allen.

== Notable alumni ==
- Ali Alexander
- Chris Boswell
- Sheldon Neuse
- Debby Ryan
