= Bill Line =

American gridiron football player (born 1948)

No. 67
- Position: Defensive tackle

Personal information
- Born: August 11, 1948 (age 78); San Angelo, Texas, U.S.
- Listed height: 6 ft 7 in (2.01 m)
- Listed weight: 260 lb (118 kg)

Career information
- High school: L. D. Bell (Hurst, Texas)
- College: SMU
- NFL draft: 1971: undrafted

Career history
- New Orleans Saints (1971)*; Roanoke Buckskins (1971); Dallas Cowboys (1972)*; Chicago Bears (1972); The Hawaiians (1974); Southern California Sun (1974); BC Lions (1975)*; Chicago Winds (1975); Southern California Sun (1975); Los Angeles Rams (1976)*
- * Offseason or practice squad member only

Career NFL statistics
- Games played: 13
- Stats at Pro Football Reference

Bill Line (born August 11, 1948) is an American former professional football player who was a defensive tackle in the National Football League (NFL) for the Chicago Bears. He also was a member of The Hawaiians, Southern California Sun and Chicago Winds in the World Football League (WFL). He played college football for the SMU Mustangs.

== Early life ==
Line attended L.D. Bell High School. He accepted a football scholarship from the United States Air Force Academy. He transferred to Southern Methodist University after his freshman season. As a sophomore, he suffered a knee injury and was lost for most of the season.

== Professional career ==
Line was signed as an undrafted free agent by the New Orleans Saints after the 1971 NFL draft. He was tried at defensive tackle and defensive end during training camp. He was released on September 14.

After his release, he signed with the Roanoke Buckskins of the Atlantic Coast Football League, where he played at defensive tackle in 13 games.

In 1972, he signed as a free agent with the Dallas Cowboys. On August 17, he was traded to the Chicago Bears along with offensive tackle Bob Asher and a 1973 second round draft choice (#48-Gary Hrivnak) in exchange for quarterback Jack Concannon.

In 1972, he appeared in 13 games with 8 starts at right defensive tackle. On August 22, 1973, he was released.

In September 1974, he signed with The Hawaiians of the World Football League. He was released on September 23. In 1974, he signed with the Southern California Sun of the World Football League.

In 1975, he signed with the BC Lions of the Canadian Football League, where he was tried at offensive tackle. He was cut on July 20.

In 1975, he signed with the Chicago Winds of the World Football League. In 1975, he was acquired by the Southern California Sun after the Winds team folded.

On July 14, 1976, he was signed as a free agent by the Los Angeles Rams. He was released on August 3.
