= Marshall Henderson =

American basketball player and coach (born 1990)

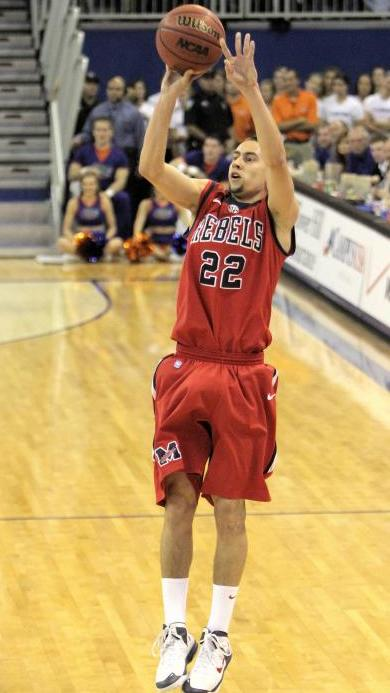

Independence Community College
- Title: Assistant Coach
- League: Kansas Jayhawk Community College Conference

Personal information
- Born: September 19, 1990 (age 36) Fort Worth, Texas
- Listed height: 6 ft 2 in (1.88 m)
- Listed weight: 175 lb (79 kg)

Career information
- High school: Bell (Hurst, Texas)
- College: Utah (2009–2010); South Plains (2011–2012); Ole Miss (2012–2014)
- NBA draft: 2014: undrafted
- Playing career: 2014–2017
- Position: Shooting guard
- Coaching career: 2018–present

Career history

Playing
- 2014–2015: Al Rayyan
- 2015: Naft Al-Janoob
- 2015: Reno Bighorns
- 2016–2017: Pavia Basket

Coaching
- 2018–2019: Birdville HS (assistant)
- 2019–2020: Thomas (assistant)
- 2020–present: Ole Miss (graduate manager)

Career highlights
- 2× Second-team All-SEC (2013, 2014); SEC Rookie of the Year – AP (2013); SEC tournament MVP (2013)
- Stats at Basketball Reference

Marshall James Henderson (born September 19, 1990) is a former professional American basketball player. He last played for Pavia Basket in the Italian Serie C-Gold league. He played college basketball for the Ole Miss Rebels. Henderson is now an assistant coach at Independence Community College in Independence, Kansas.

== High school career ==
Henderson was a standout basketball player for L. D. Bell High School in Hurst, Texas. He played for his father, Willie Henderson, and scored 2,289 points in his career. As a senior, Henderson was All-County and District MVP as he averaged 25.8 points, 5.1 assists, 5.0 rebounds, and 3.8 steals.

Henderson was rated as the number 57 shooting guard and given a scout grade of 87 in the class of 2009 by espn.com. He committed to play college basketball for Utah, turning down scholarship offers from Bradley, Gonzaga, Notre Dame, and Stanford.

== College career ==
=== Freshman year ===
In Henderson's first and only season at Utah, he started 30 of 31 games, and averaged 27.4 minutes per contest. He was second on the team with 11.8 points per game, and also had 2.5 rebounds and 0.9 assists per game. He scored a season high 24 against TCU in an MWC game. At the end of the season, Henderson earned honorable mention All-Mountain West honors, and Utah finished 14–17 (7–9 in the MWC).

=== Sophomore year ===
Henderson transferred to Texas Tech after his freshman season, and had to sit out the 2010–2011 season. At the end of the 2010–2011 season, Texas Tech fired coach Pat Knight, so Henderson transferred again, this time to South Plains Junior College. He never played a game at Texas Tech.

His sophomore season finally started during the 2011–2012 season at South Plains. Henderson led South Plains to a 36–0 record, a #1 NJCAA ranking, and a NJCAA national championship. Along with having great team success, Henderson was the Western Junior College Athletic Conference MVP, a NJCAA first-team All-American, and the NJCAA Player of the Year.

=== Junior year ===
For his junior season, Henderson transferred to the University of Mississippi. Henderson started 33 of the Rebels' 36 games, averaging an SEC-high 20.1 points per game in 31.5 minutes per game. Henderson also averaged 3.1 rebounds and 1.8 assists per game. Henderson led Ole Miss to a 27–9 record (12–6 in the SEC), including an SEC conference tournament crown and an automatic bid in the 2013 NCAA Men's Division I Basketball Tournament. He also was the SEC Newcomer of the Year, second-team All-SEC, and SEC Tournament MVP. Ole Miss received a 12 seed in the West Region and upset 5-seed Wisconsin in the first round, behind Henderson's 19 points. In the second round, Ole Miss was defeated by 13-seed La Salle 76–74; Henderson turned in a 21-point performance on 8–21 shooting.

=== Senior year ===
Henderson missed the first regular-season game against Troy, making his return versus the Coastal Carolina Chanticleers and scored 19 points in a 72–70 win. He had a controversial altercation while playing against Penn State, with two fans heckling him. He scored 19 points on the way to a 79–76 victory. He had one of his worst games against Kansas State, in which he went four for eighteen for 13 points. However, he immediately followed up with one of his best games, against Oregon, scoring 39 points against the 13th-ranked Ducks. Henderson also missed the first two regular-season SEC games versus in-state rival Mississippi State and Auburn. He returned for conference play against LSU and scored 25 points and went 7–16 in shooting, including 6–12 from beyond the arc, as well as a four-point play. He also tallied a career-high seven assists versus the Tigers. Against Mizzou, Marshall Henderson scored 29 points and added five assists. Against then-second-ranked Florida Gators, Henderson scored 22 points in the first half, but Florida shut Henderson down in the second half, winning 75–71. Against Alabama, Marshall Henderson broke Pat Bradley's record for consecutive games with a three-point shot with 61. Henderson's record currently stands at 66 games. Against in-state rival Mississippi State, Henderson and Jarvis Summers led the Rebels to a comeback win. Down 13 points in the second half, Henderson willed the team to a victory, scoring 21 points. In the SEC Tournament quarterfinals versus Georgia, Henderson had one of the worst games of his career, scoring 19 points and shooting 5–21 and 2–16 from beyond the arc.

== Professional career ==
After going undrafted in the 2014 NBA draft, Henderson landed a tryout in Italy that led to short contracts with Orsi Derthona Basket Tortona and OpenjobMetis Varese. After the Italian jobs dried up, Henderson's next stop was Qatar. On November 1, 2014, he signed with Al Rayyan Doha of the Qatari Basketball League. A week later, he was a member of the 2014 Arab Club Championship team, where he earned MVP honors. His stint with Al Rayyan lasted until January 2015, with his last game for the club coming on December 31. In nine league games for Al Rayyan, he averaged 17.1 points and 5.6 rebounds per game.

In mid-February 2015, Henderson signed a $10,000 per month contract with Naft Al-Janoob of the Iraqi Basketball Premier League.

On September 18, 2015, Henderson signed with the Sacramento Kings. However, he was later waived by the Kings on October 15 after appearing in one preseason game. On November 2, he was acquired by the Reno Bighorns of the NBA Development League as an affiliate player of the Kings. On November 27, he was waived by Reno after averaging 6.8 points and 1.2 rebounds in four games.

On October 25, 2016, Henderson signed with Pavia Basket in the Italian Serie C-Gold.

Since April 2017 following his season in Italy, Henderson has not had a professional basketball contract and plays recreationally in Dallas, Texas.

=== Basketball Tournaments ===
In 2017, Henderson played for Ole Hotty Toddy of The Basketball Tournament. Henderson's team was eliminated in the first round by Team NC Prodigal Sons. The Basketball Tournament is an annual $2 million winner-take-all tournament broadcast on ESPN.

== Coaching career ==
In 2018, Henderson began his coaching career as an assistant at Birdville High School in Texas. Henderson spent the 2019–20 season as an assistant coach at Thomas University. In August 2020, he returned to Ole Miss as a graduate manager. Henderson is now an Assistant Coach at Independence Community College in Independence, Kansas.

== Off-court issues ==
In the spring of 2012, Henderson spent time in jail stemming from a 2010 forgery charge. Henderson used $800 of counterfeit money to buy marijuana in 2009 and was caught. He spent 25 days in jail as a result. However, the reason he wasn't jailed until mid-2012 for a charge stemming from 2010 is that he violated his probation in January 2012, having tested positive for cocaine, marijuana and alcohol in Tarrant County, Texas.

On May 12, 2014, Henderson came under fire on Twitter when he posted a pair of homophobic tweets, targeting openly-gay NFL player Michael Sam. He later claimed that his tweets were part of a social media psychology experiment for a gay friend and Psychology student.
