= Anthony Bardon =

Central midfielder for the Gibraltar national football team

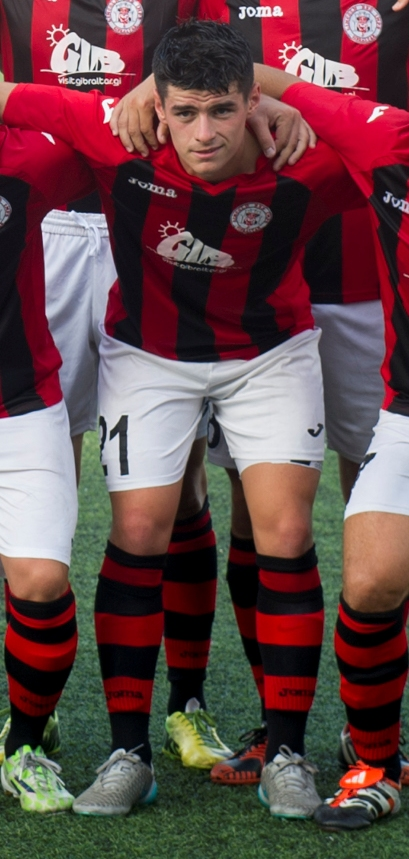

Personal information
- Full name: Anthony Michael Bardon
- Date of birth: 19 January 1993 (age 33)
- Place of birth: London, England
- Position: Central midfielder

Team information
- Current team: Lincoln FC DFW (director-manager)

Youth career
- 2007–2011: Birdville Hawks
- 2012–2013: Tooting & Mitcham United

College career
Years	Team	Apps	(Gls)
2011	Eastern New Mexico Greyhounds	17	(3)

Senior career*
Years	Team	Apps	(Gls)
2013	Tooting & Mitcham United		
2013	Bromley	3	(0)
2013–2014	Cray Wanderers	8	(0)
2014	Manchester 62	7	(1)
2014–2016	Lincoln Red Imps	34	(4)
2016	Sheffield	3	(0)
2016–2018	Lincoln Red Imps	50	(9)
2021	Lincoln FC DFW		

International career^{‡}
2014–2019	Gibraltar	29	(0)

Managerial career
- 2022–: Gibraltar (assistant coach)
- * Club domestic league appearances and goals as of 21:48, 2 November 2018 (UTC+2) ‡ National team caps and goals as of 23:18, 10 June 2019 (UTC+1)

Anthony Michael Bardon (born 19 January 1993) is a football coach and former player. A central midfielder, he played for the Gibraltar national football team and at club level for Lincoln Red Imps.

After retiring from senior football in 2019, he relocated to the United States. He is the owner, director and head coach for Lincoln FC Dallas Fort Worth in the Metroplex Premier League.

== Early career ==
Born in London before moving to America, Bardon attended high school at Birdville High School in North Richland Hills, Texas, USA. He played for the school's soccer team before graduating in 2011. After high school, Bardon played one year of college soccer for the Greyhounds of Eastern New Mexico University. In his only season with the team, he tallied three goals and four assists in seventeen matches.

== Club career ==
After returning to the UK, Bardon spent his youth career at Tooting & Mitcham United before moving to Bromley in 2013. Despite this, he failed to start and moved with reserve team manager Keith Bird to Cray Wanderers early in the season. In winter he moved to Gibraltar to play for Manchester 62 and put in a number of impressive performances, becoming a fixture in the starting XI. On 24 July 2014 he moved to league champions Lincoln Red Imps. With Lincoln, Bardon appeared in four matches in the club's 2015–16 UEFA Champions League qualifying campaign and scored a goal in the first round against FC Santa Coloma of Andorra.

In January 2016, it was announced that Bardon was released from his contract with Lincoln early after he received an offer from a club in the USA. That club was later revealed to be Saint Louis FC of the United Soccer League. It was reported that Bardon was set to join up with Sheffield F.C. of the English Northern Premier League on a short-term basis to gain match fitness before the start of the 2016 USL season. Bardon made a total of 34 appearances, tallying 4 goals, in the Gibraltar Premier Division between his time with Manchester 62 and Lincoln Red Imps. Bardon made his Northern Premier League debut for Sheffield as a start in a 0–2 defeat to Leek Town F.C. on 26 January 2016. He was named Man of the Match for his performance.

After unsuccessfully seeking a professional contract, Bardon returned to the Red Imps in July. He played in the club's shock 1-0 first leg victory over Celtic in the 2016–17 UEFA Champions League qualifiers. He would go on to star in midfield for Lincoln over the next two seasons, scoring 9 goals in 46 games. After completing a transfer degree at Ozarks Technical Community College while playing, he moved to the US in 2018 to study at Missouri Baptist University. However, he remained under contract at Lincoln and returned to action on 1 October against St Joseph's.

On 4 February 2019, it was revealed that Bardon was on the pre-season roster of North Texas SC of USL League One, the new reserve side of Major League Soccer side FC Dallas. He joined the club as a trialist after impressing in an open try-out, having previously considered retiring from football after becoming disillusioned with the sport while at Lincoln Red Imps. However, he was not offered a contract, and he retired from football. He become a skills coach for North Texas Celtic FC, an amateur youth soccer club. He also served on the coaching staff of North Texas SC until March 2020.

Anthony Bardon is now the owner and academy director of Lincoln Football Club (Dallas Fort Worth). Since 2021 he has managed a senior team in the Metroplex Premier League. In September 2022, he joined the technical team of the Gibraltar national football team, assisting Julio César Ribas.

== International career ==
In summer 2013 along with Danny Higginbotham, Bardon declared his eligibility to play for the Gibraltar national football team after the territory's acceptance into UEFA, however he was not included in the squad to face Slovakia in November, and was only a stand-by for the games against Estonia and the Faroe Islands in March 2014. He made his debut in the May 2014 friendly against Estonia, providing the assist for Jake Gosling to score the equaliser in a 1–1 draw - the first away draw by the national side. He also played in the side's 1–0 victory against Malta. He announced his retirement from playing in order to focus on coaching on 9 June 2019, with his final game coming the next day against Ireland.

=== International career statistics ===
As of match played 10 June 2019.

Gibraltar national team
Year	Apps	Goals
2014	2	0
2015	6	0
2016	5	0
2017	5	0
2018	7	0
2019	4	0
Total	29	0
