= Haltom City, Texas =

- City
- City of Haltom City
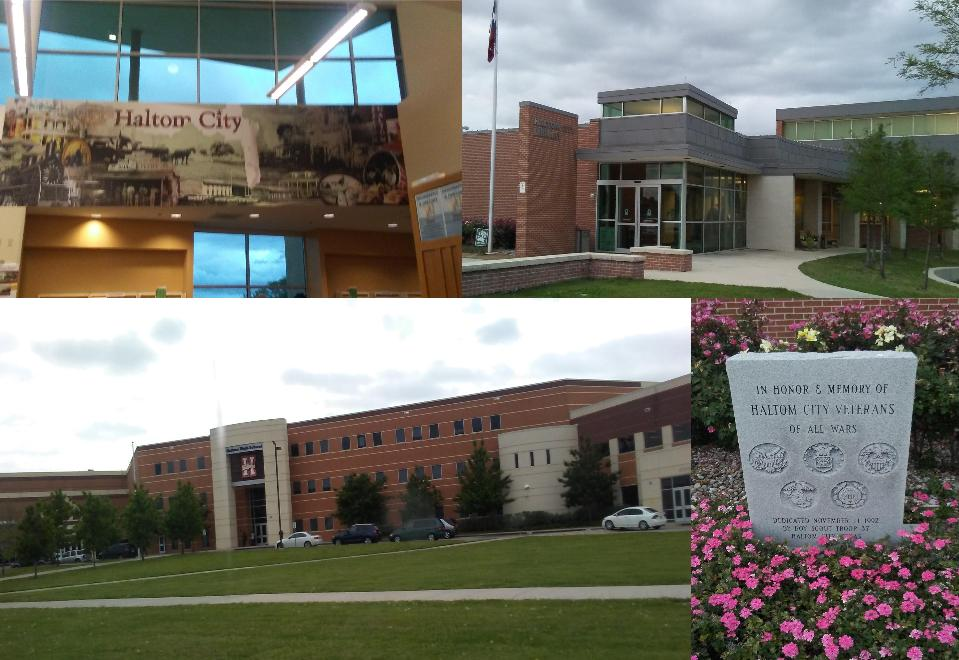
- Clockwise from top left: a mural inside the HCPL dedicated to Haltom City, the state-of-the-art City Library exterior, the Haltom High School

- Flag
- Motto: "a place to call home"
- Location of Haltom City in Tarrant County, Texas
- Coordinates: 32°48′58″N 97°15′18″W
- Country: United States of America
- State: Texas
- County: Tarrant
- Founded: 1932
- Incorporated: July 5, 1949
- Home Rule Charter: October 10, 1955

Government
  - Type: Council-Manager

Area
  - Total: 12.38 sq mi (32.06 km^{2})
  - Land: 12.35 sq mi (31.98 km^{2})
  - Water: 0.031 sq mi (0.08 km^{2}) 0.16%
- Elevation: 594 ft (181 m)

Population (2020)
  - Total: 46,073
  - Density: 3,731/sq mi (1,441/km^{2})
- Demonym: Haltomite
- Time zone: UTC-6 (CST)
  - Summer (DST): UTC-5 (CDT)
- ZIP codes: 76117
- Area code: 817
- FIPS code: 48-31928
- GNIS feature ID: 2410691
- Website: www.haltomcitytx.com

Haltom City is a city in the U.S. state of Texas, located in Tarrant County. It is part of the Mid-Cities region of the Dallas–Fort Worth Metroplex. Its population was 46,073 at the 2020 census. Haltom City is an inner suburb of Fort Worth, a principal city of the DFW Metroplex. The city is six miles from downtown Fort Worth, 30 miles from the American Airlines Center in Dallas, and 20 miles from the Dallas/Fort Worth International Airport. Haltom City is surrounded almost entirely by Fort Worth, North Richland Hills, Watauga, and Richland Hills.

The education system for Haltom City is served by the Birdville Independent School District, which also serves neighboring cities including Fort Worth, North Richland Hills, Watauga, and as far as Hurst. It is also served in the north by Keller ISD, with high-school students exclusively feeding into Fossil Ridge High School in Fort Worth. The city is home to 10 parks, a public library, and a recreation center. Haltom City is surrounded by major highways including, Highway 26, Highway 377, SH 121, (NE 28th St) SH 183, and Interstate 820.

== Geography ==
According to the United States Census Bureau, the city has a total area of 12.4 square miles (32.1 km^{2}), of which 12.4 square miles (32.1 km^{2}) are land and 0.04 square mile (0.1 km^{2}) (0.16%) is covered by water.

== Demographics ==
Historical population
Census	Pop.	Note	%±
1950	5,760		—
1960	23,133		301.6%
1970	28,127		21.6%
1980	29,014		3.2%
1990	32,856		13.2%
2000	39,018		18.8%
2010	42,409		8.7%
2020	46,073		8.6%
U.S. Decennial Census 2010 2020

=== 2020 census ===
As of the 2020 census, Haltom City had a population of 46,073 people, 16,589 households, and 10,520 families residing in the city.

The median age was 33.2 years, and 25.8% of residents were under the age of 18 while 11.3% were 65 years of age or older. For every 100 females there were 102.4 males, and for every 100 females age 18 and over there were 100.6 males age 18 and over.

100.0% of residents lived in urban areas, while 0.0% lived in rural areas.

There were 16,589 households in Haltom City, of which 36.5% had children under the age of 18 living in them. Of all households, 41.5% were married-couple households, 24.1% were households with a male householder and no spouse or partner present, and 26.9% were households with a female householder and no spouse or partner present. About 26.6% of all households were made up of individuals and 7.7% had someone living alone who was 65 years of age or older.

There were 17,582 housing units, of which 5.6% were vacant. The homeowner vacancy rate was 1.0% and the rental vacancy rate was 6.5%.

Haltom City racial composition as of 2020 (NH = Non-Hispanic) (Note: Note: the US Census treats Hispanic/Latino as an ethnic category. This table excludes Latinos from the racial categories and assigns them to a separate category. Hispanics/Latinos can be of any race.)
Race	Number	Percentage
White (NH)	16,088	34.92%
Black or African American (NH)	3,349	7.27%
Native American or Alaska Native (NH)	158	0.34%
Asian (NH)	3,611	7.84%
Pacific Islander (NH)	84	0.18%
Some other race (NH)	121	0.26%
Multiracial (NH)	1,321	2.87%
Hispanic or Latino	21,341	46.32%
Total	46,073	

== Government and infrastructure ==
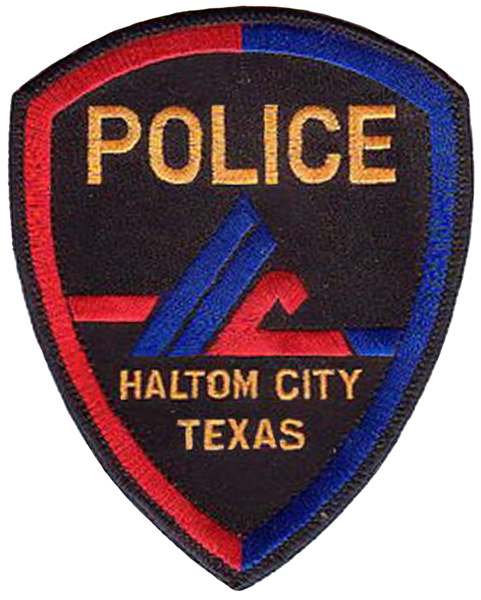
Alternative badge of the HCPD

The City of Haltom City Home Rule Charter was adopted October 10, 1955. The city operates under a council-manager form of government and provides a full range of services that include public safety (police and fire), municipal court, sanitation, parks, library, public works, and general administrative services. The city also owns and operates a water distribution system, a wastewater collection system, and a drainage utility system.

== Economy ==
=== Top employers ===
According to Haltom City's 2024 Annual Comprehensive Financial Report, the top employers in the city are:

#	Employer	# of Employees
1	Birdville ISD	3,103
2	Tyson Foods	800
3	Medtronic Midas Rex	350
4	City of Haltom City	289
5	GST Manufacturing	220
6	MICA Corporation	200
7	Liberty Carton Company	154
8	Unifirst	137
9	Falcon Steel Company	125
10	Blackmon Mooring	120

== Education ==
Most of Haltom City is served by the Birdville Independent School District, with portions served by the Fort Worth Independent School District and Keller Independent School District.

Haltom City Public Library is the regional library of the city and is a well-known partner of the Fort Worth Public Library.

In 2011, an extension of Tarrant County College (TCC) Northeast Campus, the Northeast Training/Learning Center, opened in the 17,000-square-foot (1,600 m^{2}) former civic center of Haltom City. The extension, less than 8 miles (13 km) from the main TCC Northeast Campus, includes classroom and training areas. Haltom City had approached TCC, inquiring on how to add community college services for working-class families with limited transportation options.

== Media ==
WBAP-FM serves the Dallas Fort Worth Metroplex as a news/talk radio station that is currently owned by Cumulus Media.
