= Fossil Ridge High School =

Fossil Ridge High School may refer to

- Fossil Ridge High School (Fort Collins, Colorado)
- Fossil Ridge High School (Fort Worth, Texas)
