= Timber Creek High School =

Timber Creek High School may refer to:

- Timber Creek High School (Florida)
- Timber Creek High School (Texas)
- Timber Creek Regional High School (New Jersey)
