= Keller High School =

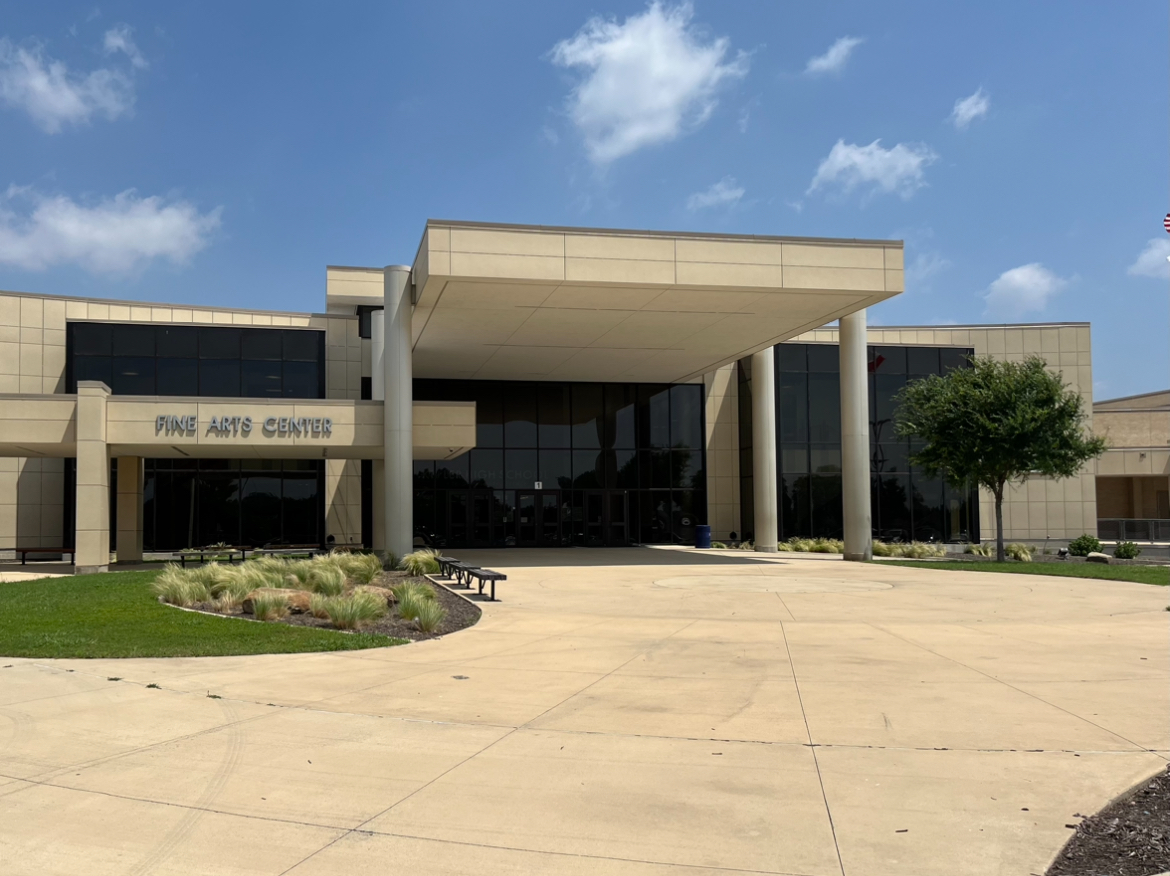

Location
- 601 N. Pate-Orr; Keller, Texas 76248; United States; 32.940429°N 97.233022°W

Information
- School type: Public, high school
- School district: Keller ISD
- Superintendent: Dr. Cory Wilson
- Principal: Lisa Simmons
- Teaching staff: 180.28 (FTE)
- Grades: 9-12
- Enrollment: 3,023 (2023-2024)
- Student to teacher ratio: 16.77
- Colors: Navy, gold, and white
- Nickname: Indians
- Website: www.kellerisd.net/KHS

Keller High School is a public high school located in the city of Keller, Texas and is served by the Keller Independent School District. The school educates students in the majority of the city of Keller, western Southlake, northwestern Colleyville, northern North Richland Hills, and most of Westlake, including the Vaquero development. It has been recognized as a National Blue Ribbon School for the 1999-2000 school year. As of 2011, Keller High School is rated "recognized" by the Texas Education Agency and is part of one of the largest districts in Texas to have an overall recognized rating. according to a US News page the school currently has 3,089 students enrolled.

== History ==
The current Keller High located on 601 Pate Orr Road N was constructed in 1984 and was opened in 1985. Prior to this the current Keller Middle School located on 300 College Avenue was the Keller High School. Built in 1934, the Keller ISD Education Center was the original location of the Keller Elementary, Middle and High School and is first high school to be built in KISD, followed by Fossil Ridge High School, Central High School and finally Timber Creek High School as of 2009. The school's mascot is the 'Keller Indians' & motto is the 'Home of the Indians'. The phrase, 'Tradition of Excellence' can also be seen frequently in this context. The school colors are navy and Vegas gold. Keller, Central, Fossil Ridge, and Timber Creek all share the same stadium and natatorium.

== JROTC ==
Keller High School currently has a JROTC program. The Junior Reserve Officer Training Corps (JROTC) is a federal program sponsored by the United States Armed Forces in high schools and also in some middle schools across the United States and United States military bases across the world. However, the program takes place at Central High School, a neighboring school in the KISD. The program, which consists of participants from all 4 KISD high schools, has won numerous awards and recognition.

== Athletics ==
Keller High School has won numerous University Interscholastic League (UIL) State Championships in the following sports:

=== Baseball ===
In 2021 Keller Varsity Baseball made the state championship for the first time in school history losing to Rockwall Heath High School, then in 2026 they won their first state championship against Lake Travis High School with star 2 way player Cole Koeninger leading them to the state championship.

=== Basketball ===
In 2017, Keller Boys' Varsity Basketball Team went to the state championship in San Antonio, Texas but lost to Karen Wagner High School in the semifinals at the Alamodome with a crowd of more than 12,000 spectators at the game. TCU-bound R.J. Nembhard led the team that year. He was a 4-star recruit and was 11th ranked in the state of Texas basketball recruiting. He averaged 28 points per game in his senior year and led the team in assists as well.

=== Softball ===
Keller High Softball has won 4 state championships in the 5A & 6A classes of Texas UIL. Their championships occurred in 2003, 2005, 2016, and 2017. The 2003 & 2005 State Champion teams were coached by Moe Fritz. The 2016 & 2017 State Champion teams were coached by Bryan Poehler. As of 2017, Keller High school has graduated 63 players who have gone on to play softball in college. The softball team is annually one of the most dominant softball teams in Texas.

=== Swimming & Diving ===
Keller High Boys Swimming & Diving has won 3 State Championships in the 6A Class of Texas UIL. With their first state championship coming in 2023, a second in 2024, ans a third in 2025 where they topped nearby Houston Klein. The Boys Swimming & Diving additionally broke 4 National Records in the 2024 state championship. As of 2024, Keller High School boys swimming & diving is also home to U.S. Men’s National Teamer, World Junior Champion, and National Age Group Record Holder, Maximus Williamson (Class of ‘25) & U.S. Men’s Junior National Teamer Cooper Lucas (Class of ‘24). The Boys Swimming & Diving has also produced 10 NCAA Division I recruits since 2014 with 6 coming from the last 2 years, 2 of which (Maximus Williamson & Cooper Lucas) finished at 1st in there class worldwide with a perfect 1.00 power index. In early 2024/25 School year the 2024 Keller High School Boys were declared national champions by SwimmingWorldMagazine.

Keller High Girls Swimming & Diving won their first state championship in 2025. On the 2025 team was Avery Collins, a member of the US Women’s Junior National Team and current swimmer for the University of Texas.

== Arts ==
=== Keller High School Band ===
The Keller High School Band has received numerous awards over the years. The band placed 2nd at the 1999 Texas 4A State Marching Band Contest, and was the 1999 TMEA 4A Honor Band. They have been honored five times by the Foundation for Music Education as a National Winner in the National Wind Band Honors Project.

The marching band was awarded the 2015 Sudler Shield of Honor by the John Philip Sousa Foundation, making them one of only 76 band programs worldwide to hold this honor.

In 2018, the Keller High School Marching Band represented the entire state of Texas at the annual Macy's Thanksgiving Day Parade in New York City.

The band is a 2-time participant and finalist at the Bands of America Grand National Championships, placing 11th in 2015 and 10th in 2023.

=== Keller High School Theatre ===
The Keller High School Theatre Department is the theatre program.

Keller High School Theatre has a record in the University Interscholastic League (UIL) One-Act Play competition, having advanced to the State Meet five times. The program's state appearances include:

- 1986 - I Never Sang For My Father
- 1999 – The Thwarting of Baron Bolligrew
- 2004 – The Shoemaker's Prodigious Wife
- 2010 – Richard III – Winner, 5A State Championship
- 2014 – All the King’s Men
- 2025 – Silent Sky – Winner, 6A State Championship

The 2010 victory with Richard III was under the direction of Helen Lewis, P. Shawn McCrea, and Sara Zinck.

The 2025 state title for Silent Sky was led by Mandi Tapia, Brian Ketcham, Chantz Cochran, and Shelby Pool.

=== Theatrical Design ===
Keller High School Theatre has been a competitor in the UIL Theatrical Design Contest, sending 43 students to the state level over the past decade. Students have competed in categories including set design, costume design, hair and makeup, and marketing.

=== Betty Lynn Buckley Awards ===
Keller High School Theatre has been recognized extensively at the Betty Lynn Buckley Awards, an annual celebration of excellence in high school theatre across North Texas. The program has earned 14 Buckley Awards, including the prestigious Best Musical award in 2025 for their production of Little Shop of Horrors.

=== Keller High School Choir ===
The Keller High School Choir consists of five concert ensembles and two show choirs.

== Mascot ==
The school's mascot, the Keller Indians, has been criticized as demeaning to indigenous people of the Americas by students of the school. An online petition by students to lobby change of the mascot reached 35,000 signatures, following an earlier petition by the Texan non-profit Society of Native Nations. An opposition position garnered 3000 signatures, with a trustee comparing the students' aims to Nazi actions in the Holocaust.

== Notable alumni ==
Alumni

- Bryce Boneau, soccer player
- Giovanni Capriglione, politician
- Hugh Charles, professional Canadian football player
- Brittany Broski, American media personality and YouTuber
- Shea Langeliers, professional baseball player
- Jon Edwards, professional baseball player
- Nolan Frese, professional football player
- Jim Landtroop, politician and businessman
- McKinley Moore, professional baseball player
- Max Muncy, professional baseball player
- Bubba Thornton, college track and field coach
- Davis Webb, NFL quarterback
- RJ Nembhard, professional basketball player
- Cole Male, Musician
- Kyle Morris, Musician
- Sione Teuhema, football player

Faculty

- Christopher M. Anderson, former band director
