= Artisan Center Theater =

Coordinates: 32.8236°N 97.1633°W

- ACT
- Interactive map of Artisan Center Theater
- Address: 444 E. Pipeline Road; Hurst, Texas; USA
- Capacity: 195
- Type: Center Theater/Theater in the round

Construction
- Opened: 2003
- Closed: 2024

Artisan Center Theater was a community theater based in the DFW area. Artisan produced over 15 shows per year, from Broadway classics to straight plays, with over 100,000 patrons annually

Artisan closed in July 2024 after rent disputes between the owner, Richard Blair and the landlord of the building.

== History ==
Artisan Center Theater opened its doors March 2003 with the southern comedy Steel Magnolias. Its first home was located in the North Hills Mall, North Richland Hills, TX. When the North Hills Mall closed in January 2005, Artisan relocated next to the former Belaire Theater in the Belaire Shopping Plaza.

In February 2019, Artisan's Hurst offices were subject to a break-in, with an estimated loss of $10,000.

The COVID-19 lockdowns in 2020 lead to prolonged financial difficulties for the owners, who fell behind on rent. Artisan closed in July 2024 after over 21 years of operation, with its last performance being of the musical Anastasia, performed at the local Birdville High School.

== Programs ==
=== Artisan Children's Theater ===
Shortly after opening its doors, Artisan started Artie's Playhouse, an interactive theater for children. Each play, using song, dance and dialogue, emphasizes different character values and features performances by children. Artie's Playhouse was later called Artisan Children's Theater with multiple performances per week.

=== The Artisan Academy ===
The Artisan Academy was a series of classes designed to expose youth, ages 3 and up, to performance in a live theater setting. Classes followed the local school district calendar, with additional workshops offered in summer months. Classes in creative dramatics, acting, musical theater, dance, improvisation and technical skills were in session year round.
