= Rey Fuentes =

Puerto Rican baseball player (born 1991)

Reymond Fuentes
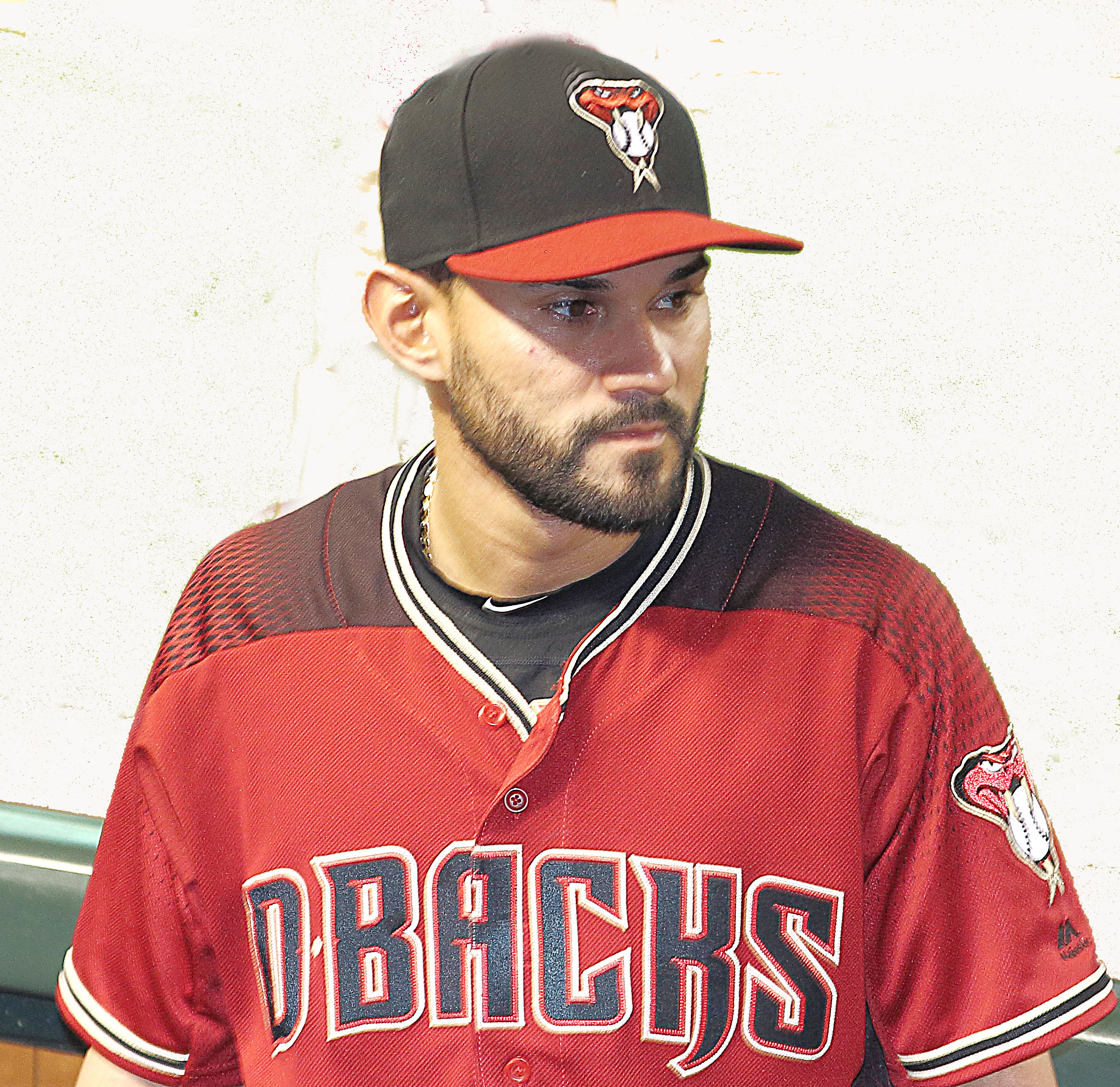
- Fuentes with the Diamondbacks in 2017
- Outfielder
- Born: February 12, 1991 (age 35); Orlando, Florida, U.S.
- Batted: Left Threw: Left

MLB debut
- August 26, 2013, for the San Diego Padres

Last MLB appearance
- September 30, 2017, for the Arizona Diamondbacks

MLB statistics
- Batting average: .238
- Home runs: 3
- Runs batted in: 15
- Stats at Baseball Reference

Teams
- San Diego Padres (2013); Kansas City Royals (2016); Arizona Diamondbacks (2017)
Medals
Men's baseball
Representing Puerto Rico
World Baseball Classic
Silver medal – second place	2017 Los Angeles	Team

Reymond Louis Fuentes (born February 12, 1991) is a Puerto Rican professional baseball outfielder who is a free agent. He has played in Major League Baseball (MLB) for the San Diego Padres, Kansas City Royals, and Arizona Diamondbacks.

== Early life ==
Fuentes attended Fernando Callejo High School in Manatí, Puerto Rico where he was a sprint champion.

== Professional career ==
=== Boston Red Sox ===
Fuentes was drafted by the Boston Red Sox in the first round of the 2009 MLB draft. He was the 28th overall pick of the draft, and was given a $1,134,000 signing bonus.

=== San Diego Padres ===
On December 6, 2010, he was traded to the San Diego Padres along with Anthony Rizzo, Casey Kelly, and Eric Patterson for first baseman Adrián González. Fuentes was ranked between the sixth and tenth best prospect in the Red Sox organization.

Fuentes spent 2011 with the High-A Lake Elsinore Storm where he hit .275 in 510 at-bats and stole 41 bases. In 2012, he played 134 games in center field with the Double-A San Antonio Missions where his average dropped to .218 in 473 at-bats. Fuentes again opened 2013 with the Missions and raised his average to .316 with 6 home runs and 29 stolen bases in 93 games, spending time at all 3 outfield positions. He was promoted to the Triple-A Tucson Padres on August 10 where he collected 23 hits in 14 games before his Major League call-up.

Fuentes played for the World Team in the 2013 All-Star Futures Game.

Fuentes was called up to the Major Leagues from Triple-A on August 26, 2013, and started in center field that night. He remained with the team for the remainder of the year, making six more starts in center and appearing in a total of 23 games. He collected 5 hits in 33 at-bats and also had 3 stolen bases.

=== Kansas City Royals ===
On November 20, 2014, Fuentes was traded to the Kansas City Royals for Kyle Bartsch. After a Spring Training in which he hit .386, Fuentes was selected to be the Royals' Opening Day right fielder to start off the 2016 season, winning the spot over Jarrod Dyson and Paulo Orlando. Despite hitting .317 in 44 plate appearances as a Royal, he was sent down to Triple-A Omaha and released after clearing waivers on September 14.

=== Arizona Diamondbacks ===
On December 24, 2016, Fuentes signed a minor league contract with the Arizona Diamondbacks. He was called up to the Diamondbacks on May 16, 2017, and was inserted into the starting lineup the same day. He hit his first MLB home run on June 18, in the 10th inning of a tie game with the Philadelphia Phillies against Jeanmar Gómez. The Diamondbacks won 5–4.

Fuentes was designated for assignment on January 31, 2018, and cleared waivers on February 5. Fuentes spent the season with the Triple-A Reno Aces, playing in 85 games and hitting .265/.345/.394 with six home runs, 39 RBI, and 10 stolen bases. He elected free agency following the season on November 2.

=== Long Island Ducks ===
On April 4, 2019, Fuentes signed with the Long Island Ducks of the Atlantic League of Professional Baseball. In 100 games, Fuentes slashed .258/.340/.429 with 14 home runs and 47 RBI. He became a free agent following the season. Fuentes did not play in a game in 2020.

After the 2020 season, he played for Criollos de Caguas of the Liga de Béisbol Profesional Roberto Clemente (LBPRC). He has also played for Puerto Rico in the 2021 Caribbean Series.

On May 26, 2021, Fuentes re-signed with the Ducks for the upcoming season. In 22 games, he slashed .222/.355/.349 with two home runs and 11 RBI. Fuentes elected free agency following the season.

== International career ==
Fuentes played for the Puerto Rico national baseball team at the 2011 Baseball World Cup, 2011 Pan American Games, and 2017 World Baseball Classic (WBC). In 2017 WBC, he played center field defensively and batted ninth. In six games, he batted 2-for-16.

== Personal life ==
Fuentes is the cousin of former MLB All-Star Carlos Beltrán. They played together in the 2017 World Baseball Classic.
