= 600 Hours of Edward =

Novel by Craig Lancaster, 2009

- Author: Craig Lancaster
- Language: English

600 Hours of Edward is a 2009 novel by Craig Lancaster, about Edward Stanton, a 39-year-old man with Asperger syndrome. As the title implies, the novel is about six hundred separate hours in Edward's life, as recorded in his journal.

== Story ==
Edward Stanton is a man diagnosed with Asperger syndrome. He lives a rigidly ordered life in Billings, Montana, which usually culminates in watching an episode of the police procedural drama Dragnet on old VHS tapes every night. Any deviation from this routine upsets him. Edward has no employment, and all of his expenses are paid for by his father, Ted Stanton.

Soon, events occur that cause deviation from Edward's typical solitary life. He begins to interact with his new neighbors, Donna Middleton, and her 9-year-old son, Kyle. Edward slowly forms a connection with his neighbors. While this occurs, Edward deals with various events, including a date with a woman named Joy whom he met online, which goes poorly due to Edward abruptly asking her if she would like to have sex after their date, and the death of his father, whom he had a superficial and poor relationship with.

Occasionally he meets with a counselor; he is unemployed.

The sequel Edward Adrift follows on where the story leaves off.

== Awards ==
- 2009 Montana Honor Book
- 2010 High Plains Book Award recipient, “Best First Book”
