= The Summer Son =

2011 novel by Craig Lancaster

First edition (publ. AmazonEncore)

The Summer Son is a 2011 novel by Craig Lancaster, and the second novel by the author. In 2010, it was a Utah Book Award Finalist.

== Story ==
The novel is set partly in 1979, in the west of the USA, and partly in 2007.

Mitch Quillen and his wife Cindy are undergoing a rocky patch. When Mitch's estranged father appears to be making telephone calls to the couple, only Cindy can see the potential in them. Mitch goes to visit the father he barely knows, with surprising consequences.

== Reception ==
Critical reception has been positive. The Lively Times gave a positive review for The Summer Son, stating "The writing is clear and straightforward, with depth and sincerity, giving broken hearts and damaged souls hope for healing." New West also gave a favorable opinion, writing "In The Summer Son, Lancaster has sliced open another vein of domestic pain for a more ambitious book. If he’s not quite as successful here as he was with 600 Hours of Edward—a tightly-wound novel with an unforgettable narrator (the titular Edward who has Asperger’s)—then it’s not for lack of trying."
