= Ron Faurot =

American football player (born 1962)

No. 74
- Position: Defensive end

Personal information
- Born: January 27, 1962 (age 64); Wichita, Kansas, U.S.
- Listed height: 6 ft 7 in (2.01 m)
- Listed weight: 262 lb (119 kg)

Career information
- High school: L. D. Bell (Hurst, Texas)
- College: Arkansas
- NFL draft: 1984: 1st round, 15th overall pick

Career history
- New York Jets (1984–1985); San Diego Chargers (1985)

Awards and highlights
- First-team All-American (1983); First-team All-SWC (1983)

Career NFL statistics
- Sacks: 2
- Fumble recoveries: 1
- Stats at Pro Football Reference

Ronald Edward Faurot (born January 27, 1962) is an American former professional football player who was a defensive end for two seasons with the New York Jets in the National Football League (NFL).

Faurot was born in Wichita, Kansas and graduated from L.D. Bell High School in Hurst, Texas. He then played college football for the Arkansas Razorbacks, where, as a senior, he was honored by United Press International as a first-team All-American.

Faurot was selected by the Jets in the first round of the 1984 NFL draft with the 15th overall pick. He appeared in 20 games for the Jets, over two seasons, recording two sacks.

Faurot currently owns and manages Broncos Sports Bar and Grill in Hurst, Texas.
