= Kyle Bartsch =

American baseball player (born 1991)

- Pitcher
- Born: March 10, 1991 (age 35); Hurst, Texas, U.S.
- Bats: Left Throws: Left
- Stats at Baseball Reference

Kyle Michael Bartsch (born March 10, 1991) is an American former professional baseball pitcher.

== Amateur career ==
Bartsch attended L. D. Bell High School in Hurst, Texas, and played for the school's baseball team. He began his college career at West Texas A&M University, where he played college baseball for the West Texas A&M Buffaloes. He transferred to Howard College, and played for the Howard Hawks, and then to University of South Alabama to play for the South Alabama Jaguars. In 2012, Bartsch had a 1–4 win–loss record with a 4.26 earned run average (ERA) and 10 saves with 39 strikeouts in 38 innings pitched for the Jaguars. In 2013, he had a 3–0 record with a 3.12 ERA and 12 saves, tying Michael Nakamura for the most in a single season and setting the new school record with 22. He was named second-team All-Sun Belt Conference. The American Baseball Coaches Association named Bartsch to their second-team South Central All-Region squad.

== Professional career ==
=== Kansas City Royals ===
The Kansas City Royals drafted Bartsch in the seventh round, with the 204th overall selection, of the 2013 Major League Baseball draft. He made his professional debut for the rookie-level Idaho Falls Chukars, where he had a 2–1 record and 2.45 ERA with 37 strikeouts in 21 appearances. Bartsch pitched for the High-A Wilmington Blue Rocks in 2014, where he had a 5–5 record and 2.29 ERA with 52 strikeouts over 41 appearances.

=== San Diego Padres ===
On November 20, 2014, the Royals traded Bartsch to the San Diego Padres in exchange for Reymond Fuentes.

Bartsch spent 2015 with the High-A Lake Elsinore Storm, where he was 1-3 with a 4.60 ERA and 69 strikeouts in 52 appearances. He began the 2016 campaign with the Double-A San Antonio Missions, where he struggled to an 8.31 ERA in 10 games. Bartsch was released by the Padres organization on May 18, 2016.

=== Kansas City Royals (second stint) ===
On May 20, 2016, Bartsch signed a minor league contract to return to the Kansas City Royals organization, and was assigned to the Doyble-A Northwest Arkansas Naturals. In 15 appearances for Northwest Arkansas, he compiled a 2-1 record and 0.94 ERA with 23 strikeouts and one save across 28 2/3 innings pitched.
