= Central High School (Fort Worth, Texas) =

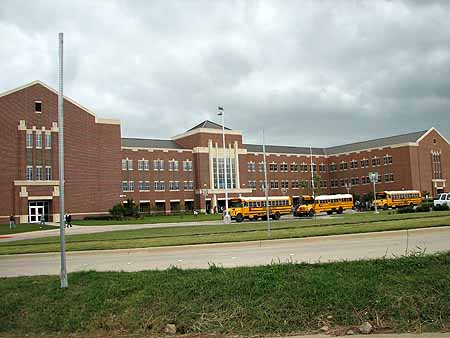

Location
- 9450 Ray White Road; Fort Worth, Texas 76244; United States; 32.910062°N 97.270389°W

Information
- Type: Public high school
- Motto: Character – Honor – Service
- Established: 2003
- School district: Keller ISD
- Superintendent: Dr. Cory Wilson
- Principal: Kathleen Eckert
- Teaching staff: 168.57 (FTE)
- Grades: 9-12
- Enrollment: 2,542 (2023-2024)
- Student to teacher ratio: 15.08
- Colors: Crimson & Gold
- Athletics conference: UIL
- Team name: Chargers
- Newspaper: The Zone
- Yearbook: The Bolt
- Website: Official Website

Central High School is a public high school in north Fort Worth, Texas, United States. The school is located entirely within the Keller Independent School District, and primarily serves neighborhoods adjacent to Highway 377 to the east and North Beach Street to the west. As of the 2021–2022 school year, the campus housed 2,598 students in grades 9-12. As of 2015, the school was rated "Met Standard" by the Texas Education Agency.

== History ==
The area of what eventually became known as Central High School was bought out by Keller ISD following the approval of a $89,700,000 bond on December 6, 1997. The school's proposal fell under proposition three, which was regarded as land for potential future school sites. Anticipating further growth, Keller ISD approved a $179.7 million bond in the fall of 2000. The new bond, which included the district's third high school alongside five additional elementary schools, ascribed the development to their situation between DFW Airport and Alliance Airport.

As construction of the new school went underway, the district's Board of Trustees named Keller High School Principal Randy Baker as the new principal of the high school. Following Keller ISD heritage of upcoming students naming schools, the school's name, mascot and colors were voted on by students, and the new school earned the name Central High School, due to its central location between the two other KISD high schools. The mascot is presently the Chargers and is represented by a lightning bolt.

The school hosted its inaugural body of about 800 freshmen and sophomores the following year, in August 2003. The school presently has 2,541 students as of the 2018–2019 school year.

The school was in Keller originally, but that area was annexed into Fort Worth.

=== Documentary ===
On February 9, 2024, a seven-person film crew from the Dutch evangelical television network Evangelische Omroep entered Central High School in Fort Worth, Texas to film a documentary series titled God, Jesus, Trump! a journalistic program examining Christian culture in the United States without authorization from the school district. The film crew was directed onto the campus by at least two members of the KISD Board of Trustees. One of the Board of Trustees members has since resigned in the aftermath of the incident. The school principal was absent on the day of the unauthorized filming. The network had been granted permission to film on the school grounds, provided that students and teachers were not included in the footage. The film crew went through all standard registration and administration procedures upon entering the building and the crew was warmly welcomed by the staff that day. The film crew was observed roaming the school premises, engaging with students, and recording them during lunch hours. Concerns were raised by parents about the exploitation of students for personal political agendas. Shortly after filming concluded, parents received a statement from the school district, stating that they were unaware of the film crew's visit. They also say an investigation is ongoing and they're working to make sure no students appear in any future documentaries. This led to outrage from students and parents, who felt their privacy rights were violated as a result. Parents demanded the removal of any board member involved.

== Central High School Theatre ==
The Central High School Theatre program, based in Texas, led by Kayla Gaar, Joseph Cabral, and Brittany Mejia.

=== UIL One-Act Play Competition ===
Central High School Theatre has a history in the UIL One-Act Play competition. Notable appearances include:

- 2009 – Rivers and Ravines – First Runner-Up
- 2010 – Glory Days
- 2017 – The Awakening of Spring – 6A State Alternate
- 2018 – Golden Boy – 6A State Alternate
- 2019 – Euripides' Medea – Winner, 6A State Championship
- 2024 – The Corn is Green – First Runner-Up
- 2025 – Summer and Smoke – 6A State Alternate

The 2019 State Championship production of Euripides' Medea was led by Joshua Harriman, Abbie Harriman, Sarah DeVito, and Tre John.

== Central Singers ==
Founded in 2004, the Central High School Choral Program is led by Aubrey Kistler & Leanna Noblett. With 7 choral classes and two Show Choirs; VOC and Voltage. Each April, every choral class competes in Choir UIL.

=== Voices of Central show choir ===
Founded in 2005, VOC was the first modern day show choir within the state of Texas. VOC has garnered 23 1st place placements within the state of Texas show choir competitions. Each February, VOC hosts the largest show choir comp in Texas; Lone Star Invitational. On the national scene, VOC has placed Texas on the show choir map garnering many high rankings. Recently, VOC placed 2nd in Biloxi, Mississippi. In 2022, a feature-length documentary, Voices of Central, directed by Israel King was released on YouTube. VOC is currently directed by Aubrey Kistler.

=== Chamber Choir/Choral Choir ===
In 2023, the Chamber Women's Choir directed by Leigh Ann McClure were invited to perform at TMEA.

== Athletics ==
Central is classified as a 6A school by the Texas UIL, facing, among others, their fellow district opponents, Keller High School and Timber Creek High School. The districts offers almost all major sports to students on campus, with exceptions to sports such as swimming, which is taught and played at the Keller Natatorium, golfing, and others.

== JROTC ==
Central High School is the home of the first JROTC unit for the Keller ISD school district, AFJROTC TX-20055 Thunderbolts, in honor of the A-10 Thunderbolt II, and in keeping with the lightning bolt theme of the school. The program, sponsored by the United States Armed Forces, has participants across the four Keller high schools.

== Publications ==
Newspaper: The Illuminator is a free monthly collaboration.

Yearbook: The Bolt is annually distributed at a cost.

Media: The Circuit is a weekly TV newscast.

== Band ==
Formed in August 2003, the Central High School Charger Band began with 73 members. The following year the band moved to 4A Varsity competition. Central was reclassified from 4A to 5A (now 6A) in 2006 and has complete in the state's largest classification ever since.
