= Gary Hrivnak =

American football player (born 1951)

No. 72
- Position: Defensive end

Personal information
- Born: March 3, 1951 (age 75); Johnstown, Pennsylvania, U.S.
- Listed height: 6 ft 5 in (1.96 m)
- Listed weight: 252 lb (114 kg)

Career information
- High school: Johnstown
- College: Purdue
- NFL draft: 1973: 2nd round, 48th overall pick

Career history
- Chicago Bears (1973–1975)

Awards and highlights
- First-team All-Big Ten (1971)
- Stats at Pro Football Reference

Gary Hrivnak (born March 3, 1951) is an American former professional football player who was a defensive end for the Chicago Bears of the National Football League (NFL) from 1973 to 1975. He played college football for the Purdue Boilermakers.
