= Birdville Independent School District =

School district in Texas

Location
- Haltom City, Texas ESC Region 11 USA
- Coordinates: 32°48′24.31404″N 97°15′16.65396″W

District information
- Type: Independent school district
- Grades: Pre-K through 12
- Established: 1926
- Superintendent: Gayle Stinson Ed.D.
- Schools: 34 (2016–17)
- NCES District ID: 4810230

Students and staff
- Students: 23,857 (2017–18)
- Teachers: 1,565.71 (2016–17) (on full-time equivalent (FTE) basis)
- Student–teacher ratio: 15.24 (2016–17)

Other information
- TEA District Accountability Rating for 2018: Overall B, with a Distinction Earned for Postsecondary Readiness
- Website: Birdville ISD

The Birdville Independent School District is a K-12 public school district based in Haltom City, Texas (USA). The name derives from a former community in the area, which later became part of Haltom City.

== Finances ==
As of the 2017–2018 school year, the appraised valuation of property in the district was $8,233,801,000. The maintenance tax rate was $0.104 and the bond tax rate was $0.041 per $100 of appraised valuation.

== Academic achievements ==
Historical district TEA accountability ratings

- Met Standard: 2013–2017
- Recognized: 1999–2002
- Academically Acceptable: 2004–2011, 1996–1998
- Accredited: 1995

Note: Texas state accountability ratings were not assigned in 2003 or 2012

== Demographics ==
The district covers 40 square miles (100 km^{2}) in northeast Tarrant County, including most of Haltom City, North Richland Hills, Richland Hills, and Watauga. It also serves small parts of Colleyville, Fort Worth, and Hurst. About 120,000 people live in the district.

== History ==
Over time, Birdville ISD has grown and expanded. As new students have been added, the district has built new schools, renovated and rebuilt old schools, and combined multiple schools into unified campuses as "partner schools". Below is a list of significant changes.

- Starting at the beginning of the 2023–2024 school year, W.T. Francisco Elementary and David E. Smith Elementary were combined to become a new David E. Smith Elementary with the mascot and cafeteria name being carried over from W.T. Francisco. A new campus is expected to be built in 2025.
- Beginning at the 2021–2022 school year, Richland Elementary and Major Cheney at South Birdville Elementary (formerly South Birdville Elementary) were combined to form a new school on a newly built campus, Cheney Hills Elementary.
- Glenview Elementary was rebuilt on the same site and renamed Jack C. Binion Elementary to honor a former principal.

== Schools ==
In the 2017–2018 school year, the district had 23,691 students in 33 schools; 21 Elementary Schools, 7 Middle Schools, and 5 High Schools

High Schools (Grades 9-12)
School Name	Mascot	Colors	Founded	Location	Additional Information
Birdville High School	Hawks	Green & Gold	1999	North Richland Hills	
Haltom High School	Buffalos	Orange & Black		Haltom City	
Richland High School	Royals	Red & Navy	1961	North Richland Hills	Previous mascot was the Rebels

Middle Schools (Grades 6-8)
School Name	Mascot	Colors	Founded	Location	Additional Information
Haltom Middle School	Tigers	Orange & White	1956	Haltom City	Current campus opened in 2021
North Oaks Middle School	Mustangs	Black & Yellow	1966	Haltom City	
North Richland Middle School	Falcons	Red & White	1963	North Richland Hills	
North Ridge Middle School	Wildcats	Maroon & White	1989	North Richland Hills	
Richland Middle School	Rams	Purple & Black	1956	Richland Hills	
Smithfield Middle School	Raiders	Blue & White	1975	North Richland Hills	
Watauga Middle School	Warriors	Green & White	1969	Watauga	

Elementary Schools (Grades PK-5)
School Name	Mascot	Colors	Founded	Location	Additional Information
Jack C. Binion Elementary	Bobcats	Maroon & White	1953	Richland Hills	Previously Glenview Elementary (1953-2003); Current campus opened in 2008
Birdville Elementary	Little Buffs	Blue & Red	1955	Haltom City	School of Fine Arts; Current campus opened in 2017; 2000-2001 National Blue Ribbon School
Cheney Hills Elementary	Cardinals	Red & Navy	2021	Richland Hills	Consolidation of Richland ES and Major Cheney ES
Foster Village Elementary	Foxes	Blue & White	1980	North Richland Hills	Renovated/Expanded in 2019
Green Valley Elementary	Gators	Green & Blue	1992	North Richland Hills	2005 National Blue Ribbon School
Grace E. Hardeman Elementary	Roadrunners	Blue & Gold	1971	Watauga	
Holiday Heights Elementary	Huskies	Red, White, & Blue	1966	North Richland Hills	
Alliene Mullendore Elementary	Panthers	Green & White	1955	North Richland Hills	
North Ridge Elementary	Longhorns	Red, White, & Blue	1988	North Richland Hills	1998–99 National Blue Ribbon School
W.A. Porter Elementary	Panthers	Red, White, & Blue	1976	Hurst	
David E. Smith Elementary	Lions	Blue & Red	1954	Haltom City	Consolidation of Smith ES and Francisco ES; New campus opened in 2025 at former Smith ES site
Smithfield Elementary	Wildcats	Red & White	1957	North Richland Hills	2017 National Blue Ribbon School
Snow Heights Elementary	Polar Bears	Navy & White	1959	North Richland Hills	
John D. Spicer Elementary	Colts	Red & Blue	1991	Haltom City	
O.H. Stowe Elementary	Beavers	Navy & Gold	1959	Haltom City	
Academy at C.F. Thomas Elementary	Tigers	Red & Navy	1978	North Richland Hills	
Walker Creek Elementary	Coyotes	Silver & Blue	2005	North Richland Hills	
Watauga Elementary	Wildcats	Green & Gold	1966	Watauga	
West Birdville Elementary	Mustangs	Red, White, & Blue	1951	Haltom City	Current campus opened in 2016

Specialized Schools
School Name	Mascot	Colors	Location	Additional Information
Birdville Center of Technology and Advanced Learning	None	Blue, Red, & Yellow	North Richland Hills	
Collegiate Academy of Birdville	Bears	Blue & Gold	Hurst	
Griggs High School	Shamrocks	Green & White	Haltom City	
Linda Kunkel Specialized Learning Center	None	None	Haltom City	

Former Schools
School Name	Founded	Closed	Location	Additional Information
Major Cheney Elementary at South Birdville	1953	2021	Haltom City	Formerly South Birdville ES; Merged with Richland ES to form Cheney Hills ES; Mascot was the Bulldogs; Colors were Blue & Yellow
W.T. Francisco Elementary	1959	2023	Haltom City	Merged with David E. Smith ES
Richland Elementary		2021	Richland Hills	Merged with Major Cheney ES to form Cheney Hills ES

== See also ==
- List of school districts in Texas
- Diane Patrick, member of the Texas House of Representatives from Arlington and a former teacher in the Birdville district
