= Keller Independent School District =

School district in Texas

Location
- 350 Keller Parkway, Keller, Texas North Texas 76248; United States
- Coordinates: 32.933810°N 97.24772°W

District information
- Type: Public
- Motto: Intentionally Exceptional
- Grades: Pre-K–12
- Established: 1911
- Superintendent: Cory Wilson (interim)
- School board: 7 members
- Chair of the board: John Birt
- Schools: 42
- NCES District ID: 4825260

Students and staff
- Students: 33,250 (2023–24)
- Teachers: 2,379.88 (FTE) (2023–24)
- Staff: 4,263.31 (2023–24)
- Student–teacher ratio: 13.97
- Colors: Green, white

Other information
- ESC: 11
- Website: www.kellerisd.net

Keller Independent School District is a school district based in Keller, Texas, United States. Keller ISD covers 51 square miles (130 km^{2}) in northeast Tarrant County in cities such as Keller, Fort Worth, Haltom City, Watauga, North Richland Hills, Hurst, Colleyville, Southlake, and Westlake, serving more than 33,000 students across 42 campuses. In 2022, the school district was given an overall grade of "B" by the Texas Education Agency.

== History ==
During the 1999-2000 school year, Keller ISD had 2 high schools serving grades 9-12 (Keller and Fossil Ridge), 2 middle schools with grades 7-8 (Keller and Fossil Hill), 2 intermediate schools with grades 5-6 (Bear Creek and Chisholm Trail), and 9 elementary schools. Of the 9 elementaries, 4 served grades K-4 (Keller-Harvel, North Riverside, Park Glen, and Willis Lane), Parkview served grades PK-4, and the remaining 4 served Head Start-4 (Florence, Heritage, Shady Grove, and Whitley Road).

In 2000, Hillwood Middle and Parkwood Hill Intermediate opened across the street from one another on Parkwood Hill Boulevard. Hidden Lakes and Lone Star Elementaries both opened with grades K-4.

In 2001, Indian Springs Middle and South Keller Intermediate opened as neighboring schools on Bursey Road.

In 2002, Bluebonnet and Freedom Elementaries opened with grades K-4.

In 2003, Central High opened with grades 9-10, scheduled to add one grade per year over the next 2 years. Head Start and Pre-K are added to most of the remaining elementaries.

In 2004, Bette Perot and Woodland Springs Elementaries opened.

In 2005, Liberty Elementary opened.

In 2006, Trinity Springs Middle and Trinity Meadows Intermediate opened as neighboring schools on Keller Hicks Road. Independence and Friendship Elementaries opened.

In 2007, Eagle Ridge Elementary opened.

In 2008, Basswood and Caprock Elementaries opened.

In 2009, Timber Creek High opened with grades 9-10, scheduled to add one grade per year over the next 2 years.

In 2010, Timberview Middle opened with grades 5-8, a new concept for the district. Keller Early Learning Center opened, housing all Keller ISD Head Start and Pre-K students. All elementary schools now housed grades K-4.

In 2011, Ridgeview Elementary opened.

From 2012-2016, no new schools are opened as the district's enrollment begins to level out.

In 2016, Sunset Valley Elementary opened. Keller Early Learning Center - South is opened and Keller Early Learning Center is renamed Keller Early Learning Center - North. South Keller Intermediate becomes Keller Center for Advanced Learning (KCAL), housing select CTE programs for all district high schools. Indian Springs Middle School became a 5-8 campus.

In 2017, Vista Ridge Middle opened with grades 5-6, scheduled to add a new grade per year over the next 2 years to become a 5-8 campus.

In 2020, Vista Ridge housed grades 6-8 and Chisholm Trail Intermediate becomes a 6th-only campus. Grade 5 for is relocated to their feeder elementary campuses (Basswood, Bluebonnet, Heritage, North Riverside, Parkview, and Sunset Valley).

In 2021, Chisholm Trail Intermediate becomes Keller Collegiate Academy (KCA) with grades 9-12. Unlike KCAL, students apply to attend KCA and enter the early college high school program. Fossil Hill Middle becomes a 6-8 campus. Florence and Heritage Elementaries open their newly rebuilt campuses.

In 2023, Parkview and Whitley Road Elementaries open their newly rebuilt campuses.

In 2025, both Early Learning Centers are closed due to the districts financial constraints. Head Start and Pre-K programs are returned to zoned elementaries.

In 2026, the district's Long Range Planning Committee and Citizens Bond Advisory Committee met 5 times to discus campus consolidation. The school board voted to close the remaining intermediate campuses, but spared Shady Grove Elementary. By closing Shady Grove Elementary, Ridgeview Elementary would be strictly zoned to Keller High rather than split with Timber Creek High.

In 2027, Bear Creek, Parkwood Hill, and Trinity Meadows Intermediates will be retired due to the ongoing district financial constraints. All middle schools will house grades 6-8 and elementaries grades PK-5.

== Schools ==
Schools are listed with the cities they are located in; predominantly, most schools are located in northeast Fort Worth, Texas, while some are within Keller, Texas city limits.

High schools (grades 9-12)
Name	Established	Mascot	Colors	Location	Additional information
Central High School	2003	Chargers	Maroon & Gold	Fort Worth	
Fossil Ridge High School	1995	Panthers	Black & Gold	Fort Worth	
Keller High School	1934	Indians	Navy & Gold	Keller	New campuses constructed in 1962 & 1984
Timber Creek High School	2009	Falcons	Purple & Gold	Fort Worth	

Middle schools
Name	Grades	Established	Mascot	Colors	Location	Additional information
Bear Creek Intermediate School	5-6	1973	Braves	Blue & Yellow	Keller	Will close after 2026-2027 school year
Fossil Hill Middle School	6-8	1987	Panthers	Black & Gold	Fort Worth	
Hillwood Middle School	7-8	2000	Chargers	Crimson & Gold	Fort Worth	Will reconfigure to house grades 6-8 after 2026-2027 school year
Indian Springs Middle School	5-8	2000	Indians	Navy & Gold	Keller	Will reconfigure to house grades 6-8 after 2026-2027 school year
Keller Middle School	7-8	1962	Comanches	Royal Blue, Black, & White	Keller	Will reconfigure to house grades 6-8 after 2026-2027 school year
Parkwood Hill Intermediate School	5-6	1999	Chargers	Crimson & Gold	Fort Worth	Will close after 2026-2027 school year
Timberview Middle School	5-8	2010	Falcons	Purple & Gold	Fort Worth	Will reconfigure to house grades 6-8 after 2026-2027 school year
Trinity Meadows Intermediate School	5-6	2005	Mustangs	Red & Black	Fort Worth	Will close after 2026-2027 school year
Trinity Springs Middle School	7-8	2005	Titans	Green, Black, & Gold	Fort Worth	Will reconfigure to house grades 6-8 after 2026-2027 school year
Vista Ridge Middle School	6-8	2017	Panthers	Black & Gold	Fort Worth	

Elementary schools
Name	Grades	Established	Mascot	Colors	Location	Additional information
Basswood Elementary School	PK-5	2008	Panthers	Black & Gold	Fort Worth	
Bette Perot Elementary School	PK-4	2004	Patriots	Red, White, & Blue	Fort Worth	Will reconfigure to house grades PK-5 after 2026-2027 school year
Bluebonnet Elementary School	PK-5	2002	Panthers	Black & Gold	Fort Worth	
Caprock Elementary School	PK-4	2008	Gators	Green & Blue	Fort Worth	Will reconfigure to house grades PK-5 after 2026-2027 school year
Eagle Ridge Elementary School	PK-4	2007	Eagles	Red, White, & Blue	Fort Worth	Will reconfigure to house grades PK-5 after 2026-2027 school year
Florence Elementary School	PK-4	1975	Indians	Navy & Gold	Southlake	Current campus opened in 2021; Will reconfigure to house grades PK-5 after 2026-2027 school year
Freedom Elementary School	PK-4	2002	Eagles	Red, White, & Blue	Fort Worth	Will reconfigure to house grades PK-5 after 2026-2027 school year
Friendship Elementary School	PK-4	2006	Chargers	Crimson & Gold	Fort Worth	Will reconfigure to house grades PK-5 after 2026-2027 school year
Heritage Elementary School	PK-5	1987	Panthers	Black & Gold	Fort Worth	Current campus opened in 2021
Hidden Lakes Elementary School	PK-4	2000	Indians	Navy & Gold	Keller	Will reconfigure to house grades PK-5 after 2026-2027 school year
Independence Elementary School	PK-4	2006	Mavericks	Red, White, & Blue	Fort Worth	Will reconfigure to house grades PK-5 after 2026-2027 school year
Keller-Harvel Elementary School	PK-4	1993	Cowboys	Navy & Gold	Keller	Will reconfigure to house grades PK-5 after 2026-2027 school year
Liberty Elementary School	PK-4	2005	Eagles	Red, White, & Navy	Colleyville	Will reconfigure to house grades PK-5 after 2026-2027 school year
Lone Star Elementary School	PK-4	2000	Chargers	Crimson & Gold	Fort Worth	Will reconfigure to house grades PK-5 after 2026-2027 school year
North Riverside Elementary School	PK-5	1998	Panthers	Black & Gold	Fort Worth	
Park Glen Elementary School	PK-4	1990	Cheetahs	Crimson & Gold	Fort Worth	Will reconfigure to house grades PK-5 after 2026-2027 school year
Parkview Elementary School	PK-5	1980	Panthers	Black & Gold	Fort Worth	Current campus opened in 2023
Ridgeview Elementary School	PK-4	2011	Rattlers	Red & Black	Keller	Will reconfigure to house grades PK-5 after 2026-2027 school year
Shady Grove Elementary School	PK-4	1991	Stars	Navy & Gold	Keller	Will reconfigure to house grades PK-5 after 2026-2027 school year
Sunset Valley Elementary School	PK-5	2016	Panthers	Black & Gold	Fort Worth	
Whitley Road Elementary School	PK-4	1985	Chargers	Crimson & Gold	Watauga	Current campus opened in 2023; Will reconfigure to house grades PK-5 after 2026-2027 school year
Willis Lane Elementary School	PK-4	1998	Wranglers	Navy & Gold	Keller	Will reconfigure to house grades PK-5 after 2026-2027 school year
Woodland Springs Elementary School	PK-4	2004	Wildcats	Green, White, & Purple	Fort Worth	Will reconfigure to house grades PK-5 after 2026-2027 school year

Specialty Campuses
Name	Established	Location	Additional information
Keller Center for Advanced Learning	2016	Keller	Houses the district's Career and Technical Education programs, high school students from Keller ISD take buses to and from there from their high school campuses.
Keller Compass Center	1995	Keller	Houses New Direction High School and DAEP

Former Schools
Name	Established	Closed	Location	Additional information
Chisholm Trail Intermediate School	1990	2021	Fort Worth	
Early Learning Center North	2009	2025	Fort Worth	
Early Learning Center South	2016	2025	Keller	
Keller Elementary School	1951	Circa 1993	Keller	
South Keller Intermediate School	2001	2016	Keller	
Keller Collegiate Academy	2021	2024	Keller	KISD's early college high school, no longer a physical campus. Now housed within the Keller Center for Advanced Learning building

== Controversies ==
=== Book challenges ===
The school district has received national attention for examining over forty books from library media centers and classrooms, including The Diary of Anne Frank, The Bluest Eye, and several versions of the Bible.

=== Film crew incident ===
On February 9, 2024, a seven-person film crew from Dutch evangelical television network Evangelische Omroep entered Central High School to film an episode of God, Jesus, Trump!, a documentary series examining Christian culture in the United States, without authorization from the school district. The film crew was invited and accompanied by two school board members, one of whom resigned in the aftermath of the incident, and was observed touring the school premises interviewing and filming students and employees. Concerns were raised by parents and students about the violation of privacy rights and the exploitation of students to promote a political agenda. >

=== The Laramie Project ===
In 2024, the school district canceled a planned performance by Timber Creek High School of The Laramie Project, a play about the 1998 hate crime murder of gay college student Matthew Shepard, citing a desire to host a more community-friendly performance. This decision was seen by many students and parents, as well as The Laramie Project playwright Moisés Kaufman, as homophobic. The district reversed the decision after community outcry.

== District Split possibility ==
During early 2025, the district Board of Trustees considered the possibility of splitting the district into two due to budgetary issues. The proposed plan to split the district involved the existing district being renamed to “Alliance ISD,” encompassing the entire current district and retaining all existing assets and liabilities, including approximately $700 million in bond debt. Following this rebranding, the portion of the district located east of U.S. Highway 377 would have formally detached and established itself as a separate entity under the original name of Keller ISD. This would have allowed the new district to qualify for benefits available to newly created school districts, while leaving the rebranded Alliance ISD with the majority of lower-income students and the majority of the district’s existing debts. The proposal faced significant opposition due to a perceived lack of transparency and questions over how certain facilities like the Keller Center for Advanced Learning (KCAL) and district natatorium would be shared between the two districts. The public backlash resulted in the resignation of district superintendent Tracy Johnson, a student-led walkout at all 4 high schools and some of the middle schools, and ultimately the abandoning of the proposal with the district citing "no viable path forward."

== See also ==
- List of school districts in Texas
