= Watauga, Texas =

- City
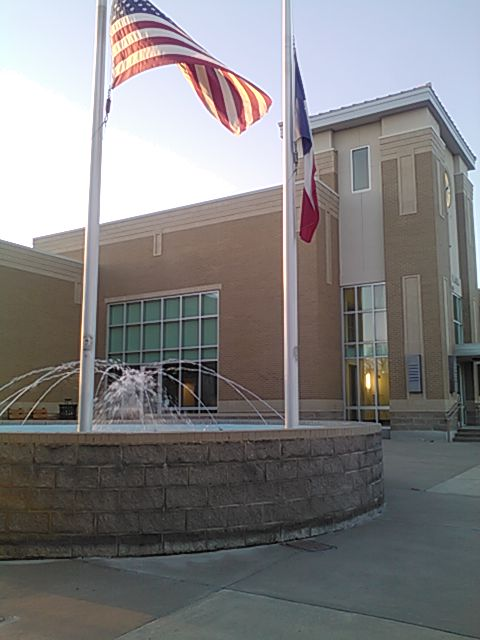
- City Hall facing north on 24 March 2016.

- Location within Tarrant County and Texas
- Coordinates: 32°52′17″N 97°14′57″W
- Country: United States
- State: Texas
- County: Tarrant

Government
  - Type: Home Rule (Mayor-Council-Manager)

Area
  - Total: 4.16 sq mi (10.77 km^{2})
  - Land: 4.16 sq mi (10.77 km^{2})
  - Water: 0 sq mi (0.00 km^{2})
- Elevation: 607 ft (185 m)

Population (2020)
  - Total: 23,650
  - Density: 5,687/sq mi (2,196/km^{2})
- Time zone: UTC-6 (CST)
  - Summer (DST): UTC-5 (CDT)
- ZIP codes: 76148, 76137
- Area codes: 817, 682
- FIPS code: 48-76672
- GNIS feature ID: 2412191
- Website: www.cowtx.org

Watauga (/wɒˈtɔːɡə/) is a city in Tarrant County, Texas, United States, and a suburb of Fort Worth. The population was 23,650 at the 2020 census. The city's businesses and retail markets are generally located on Highway 377.

== History ==
The first settlers came to Tarrant County in 1843. The Texas and Pacific Railway came through present-day Watauga in 1881, which spurred a settlement of large farms and ranches. The settlement took its name from the pre-Revolutionary War Watauga Association settlement that was located in the northeastern section of East Tennessee, in areas surrounding the Sycamore Shoals of the Watauga River, near present-day Elizabethton, Tennessee.

Watauga received a railroad station and a post office in 1883. The population was 65 in the mid-1930s and 1940s, when the railroad station had closed. The population then grew due to defense plants to over 1000 in the 1960s. The population continued to grow to 7,050 in 1976, and 20,000 in 1990.

== Geography ==
According to the United States Census Bureau, the city has a total area of 4.2 square miles (10.8 km^{2}), all land.

The city is entirely surrounded by the cities of Keller to the north, Fort Worth to the west, Haltom City to the southwest and North Richland Hills to the south and east. Almost all of the city's land area is located east of US 377, though a portion extends west of that highway and includes homes and some city offices.

== Demographics ==
Historical population
Census	Pop.	Note	%±
1970	3,778		—
1980	10,284		172.2%
1990	20,009		94.6%
2000	21,908		9.5%
2010	23,497		7.3%
2020	23,650		0.7%
2021 (est.)	23,313		−1.4%
U.S. Decennial Census

=== 2020 census ===
As of the 2020 census, Watauga had a population of 23,650 people, 8,064 households, and 6,100 families. The median age was 35.7 years, with 25.4% of residents under the age of 18 and 12.5% aged 65 years or older. For every 100 females there were 95.1 males, and for every 100 females age 18 and over there were 91.4 males age 18 and over.

Of those 8,064 households, 39.3% had children under the age of 18 living in them. Of all households, 54.2% were married-couple households, 14.0% were households with a male householder and no spouse or partner present, and 24.7% were households with a female householder and no spouse or partner present. About 17.0% of all households were made up of individuals and 7.2% had someone living alone who was 65 years of age or older.

There were 8,292 housing units, of which 2.7% were vacant. The homeowner vacancy rate was 0.9% and the rental vacancy rate was 4.5%.

As of the 2020 census, 100.0% of Watauga's population lived in urban areas, while 0.0% lived in rural areas.

Racial composition as of the 2020 census
Race	Number	Percent
White	14,671	62.0%
Black or African American	1,516	6.4%
American Indian and Alaska Native	223	0.9%
Asian	1,483	6.3%
Native Hawaiian and Other Pacific Islander	114	0.5%
Some other race	2,298	9.7%
Two or more races	3,345	14.1%
Hispanic or Latino (of any race)	5,979	25.3%

== Economy ==
=== Top employers ===
According to Watauga's 2024 Annual Comprehensive Financial Report, the top employers in the city are:

#	Employer	# of Employees
1	Birdville ISD	250
2	Target	288
3	City of Watauga	190
4	North Pointe Health & Rehab	84
5	Albertsons	80
6	Chili's	70
7	Keller ISD	60
8	Cotton Patch Cafe	54
9	Newman Academy	50
10	Fresco's	23

== Arts and culture ==
Capp Smith Park, Watauga Pavilion and Watauga Public Library are located in Watauga.

== Government ==
Watauga is a full-service city, providing police, fire and emergency services, parks and recreation, a library, building inspection, economic development, city planning, and public works. The city operates under a Mayor-Council-Manager form of government. According to the city's 2013-2014 Comprehensive Annual Financial Report, the city's various funds had $25.5 million in revenues, $23.3 million in expenditures, $102.8 million in total assets, $32.8 million in total liabilities, and $27.5 million in cash and investments.

== Education ==
Watauga is served by two independent school districts. Birdville serves a majority of the city, while Keller serves the northwestern portion.

== Infrastructure ==
- U.S. Route 377
