= Craig Lancaster =

American writer and journalist (born 1970)

- Born: February 9, 1970 (age 56); Lakewood, Washington, U.S.
- Occupations: Writer, journalist
- Known for: novels: 600 Hours of Edward, Edward Adrift, The Summer Son

Craig Lancaster (born February 9, 1970) is an American author, playwright, and journalist, best known for his novels 600 Hours of Edward, its sequel, Edward Adrift, and The Summer Son. His other notable works include a short story collection as well as numerous articles and essays produced during his career as a newspaper writer and editor. The author, a two-time High Plains Book Awards winner, was lauded as "one of Montana's most important writers."

Lancaster's works are set against the backdrop of the contemporary American West, specifically Montana, where he lives and writes. His prose has been described as deeply emotional and deceptively direct, centering on intense characters who navigate obstacles and relationships in ways that are simultaneously humorous and poignant. His literary influences include Hemingway, Steinbeck, Stegner, and Doig.

== Biography ==
Craig Lancaster was born in Lakewood, Washington, on February 9, 1970. He was adopted by a Wyoming couple who met in Billings, Montana, where he would eventually settle and launch his career as a novelist. After his parents divorced in the early 1970s, his mother remarried and moved Craig to suburban Fort Worth, Texas.

His step-father, a longtime sportswriter for the Fort Worth Star-Telegram, had a tremendous impact on Lancaster's formative years by encouraging his early interest in writing. Lancaster's fascination with the "Western identity" was also rooted in his childhood, as he traveled extensively during summer vacations to visit his father, who followed work in Western oil fields. Lancaster describes his early memories of Montana as "vast, beautiful, [and] overwhelming," and knew that he "wanted to be a part of it."

Lancaster attended the University of Texas at Arlington, and subsequently made his foray into "The West" of his early imagination via a series of journalistic assignments that led him from Texas to Alaska, Kentucky, Ohio, California, Washington, and eventually, Montana. In 2006, Lancaster moved to Montana, where he married and subsequently divorced in 2015. Lancaster married fellow novelist Elisa Lorello in 2016. His work as a writer and editor has appeared in the Fort Worth Star-Telegram, San Jose Mercury News, Billings Gazette, and Magic City Magazine. He also serves as design director of Montana Quarterly, in addition to being a frequent contributor.

In October and November 2023, Yellowstone Repertory Theatre, a professional troupe in Billings, Montana, staged the world premiere production of Lancaster’s first full-length play, Straight On To Stardust. The play was hailed as “very smart and deeply moving.”

== Major works ==
=== Novels ===
- 600 Hours of Edward (Riverbend Publishing, 2009)
- The Summer Son (Lake Union Publishing, 2011)
- Edward Adrift (Lake Union Publishing, 2013)
- The Fallow Season of Hugo Hunter (Lake Union Publishing, 2014)
- This Is What I Want (Lake Union Publishing, 2015)
- Edward Unspooled (Missouri Breaks Press, 2016)
- Julep Street (Missouri Breaks Press, 2017)
- You, Me, & Mr. Blue Sky, co-author with Elisa Lorello (Lancarello Enterprises, 2019)
- And It Will Be a Beautiful Life (2021, The Story Plant)

=== Short stories ===
- Quantum Physics and The Art of Departure (Missouri Breaks Press, 2011), republished in 2016 as The Art of Departure

=== Nonfiction ===
- Past-Due Pastorals: Memories and Observations of a Mind Adrift in the West (2009)

=== Plays ===
- Straight On To Stardust (world premiere in 2023)

== Awards and recognition ==
- 2009 Montana Honor Book, 600 Hours of Edward
- 2010 High Plains Book Awards "Best First Book," 600 Hours of Edward
- 2010 Utah Book Award Finalist, The Summer Son
- 2012 Independent Publishers Book Award, Gold Medal, "Best Regional Fiction," Quantum Physics and The Art of Departure
- 2012 High Plains Book Awards Finalist, Quantum Physics and The Art of Departure
- 2014 Kindle First Selection, The Fallow Season of Hugo Hunter
- 2016 High Plains Book Award Fiction Finalist, This Is What I Want
- 2017 International Book Awards Finalist, Edward Unspooled
- 2022 American Fiction Awards Winner, "Literary Fiction," And It Will Be a Beautiful Life
- 2022 2022 High Plains Book Awards Winner, "Fiction," And It Will Be a Beautiful Life
