= Richland High School (North Richland Hills, Texas) =

Location
- 5201 Holiday Lane; North Richland Hills, Texas 76180; United States; 32°50′30″N 97°13′40″W

Information
- Type: Co-Educational, Public, Secondary
- Established: 1961
- School district: Birdville Independent School District
- Superintendent: Gayle Stinson
- Principal: Kyle Pekurney
- Teaching staff: 129.23 (FTE)
- Grades: 9-12
- Student to teacher ratio: 15.49
- Colors: Navy, red and white
- Athletics: 5A-1
- Mascot: Royals
- Rival: Haltom High School
- Feeder schools: North Ridge Middle School & North Richland Middle School
- Website: https://richlandhigh.birdvilleschools.net/

Richland High School is a secondary school located in North Richland Hills, Texas. The school includes grades 9 through 12, and is part of the Birdville Independent School District. (BISD)

== Background ==
Richland High School opened in 1961 as the second high school in the Birdville Independent School District. The school mascot is a blue and red lion. Prior to the school's opening, the colors and mascot were chosen by students and approved by the Birdville School Board. The original Rebel mascot accompanied by blue and gray colors was changed in 2020 due to controversy over its historical meaning. The school was expanded over time to meet the needs of the community, including a major expansion in the late 1980s that added a new main entrance, classroom wing, cafeteria, and administration offices.

A 2006 bond package funded a nearly-complete demolition of the original school. Only the original auditorium, the band hall, and a wing added in the late 1980s (including the library and cafeteria) were retained, while the rest of the structure was demolished and replaced with student parking. A brand-new facility was built in the old student parking area, connected to the remnants of the original structure. The new school opened for the 2009–2010 school year.

During the 2008–2009 school year, Richland High School introduced its first Advancement Via Individual Determination class. The program graduated its first group of seniors in May 2012.

== Mascot ==
In June 2020, the BISD board of trustees voted to remove the Rebel mascot and related Confederate symbols, including the Dixie Belles and Johnny Reb, as a result of a petition calling for their removal signed by over 25,000 people and amid the George Floyd protests. On July 23, 2020, it was announced that Richland's mascot from then on would be the Royals, becoming the Richland Royals.

== Notable alumni ==
- Kelly Blackwell (Class of 1987), former NFL player
- Kambri Crews (Class of 1989), comedic storyteller and author
- Wendy Davis (Class of 1981), State senator for District 10 in the Texas State Senate
- Trent Grisham (Class of 2015), professional baseball player in Major League Baseball (MLB) and currently plays for the New York Yankees
- Jeff Dazey (Class of 1999), saxophone player and member of Nathaniel Rateliff & the Night Sweats
- Craig Lancaster (Class of 1988), writer and journalist
- Gary Morris (Class of 1967), singer and stage actor
- DaShaun White (Class of 2018), professional football player in the National Football League and currently plays for the San Francisco 49ers.
- Rashee Rice (Class of 2019), professional football player in the National Football League and currently plays for the Kansas City Chiefs. He is also a Super Bowl LVIII Champion.
- Jake Kemp (Class of 2005), sports radio personality and podcaster named "Best Sports Media Personality" by the Dallas Observer, best known as the co-host of The Dumb Zone and formerly of KTCK "The Ticket."
