= Birdville High School =

Location
- 9100 Mid Cities Blvd. North Richland Hills, Texas 76180; 32.8612°N 97.1921°W

Information
- Other name: BHS
- Type: Public
- Motto: Dare to Soar!
- Established: 1999
- School district: Birdville Independent School District
- Principal: Mr. Tim Drysdale
- Staff: 127.38 (FTE)
- Grades: 9-12
- Enrollment: 2,097 (2023-2024)
- Student to teacher ratio: 16.46
- Colors: Green and Gold
- Mascot: Hawk
- Feeder schools: Richland Middle School Smithfield Middle School
- Website: Birdville High School

Birdville High School (BHS) is a public high school located in the city of North Richland Hills, Texas and is the second newest school in the Birdville Independent School District (second to Walker Creek Elementary). Established in 1999, it was the third high school built into the Birdville Independent School District. Birdville High School is home to the Birdville Hawks and hosts grades 9–12. For the 2009–2010 school year, according to the TEA (Texas Education Agency), Birdville High School's population consisted of 6.3% Black/African American, 20.6% Hispanic/Latino(a), 68.3% White/Caucasian, 0.6% Native American, and 4.2% Asian/Pacific Islander.

== Academics ==
Birdville High School offers Advanced Placement courses including Math, Science, Social Studies, English, Foreign Language, Fine Arts, and Computer Science. The majority of Birdville High School's TAKS scores are higher than both the District and State's average percentage of meeting or exceeding standards in all grades tested.

TAKS (2008–2009) Percentage of students mastering each section
	Math	Reading	ELA	Science	Social Studies
Grade 9	63%	92%	NA	NA	NA
Grade 10	67%	NA	91%	69%	92%
Grade 11	88%	NA	95%	91%	99%

== Athletics & Fine Arts ==
=== Football ===
The Birdville Hawks Football Team plays in Texas Division 5A Football. They host their games at the Birdville ISD Fine Arts/Athletics Complex in North Richland Hills, Texas which they share with Richland High School and Haltom High School. The BISD FAAC is also used to host other sports and fine arts events.

=== Basketball ===
The Birdville Hawks Boys Basketball Team plays in Texas Division 5A Boys Basketball. They advanced to the championship game in 2025.

The Birdville Lady Hawks Basketball Team plays in Texas Division 5A Girls Basketball.

=== Baseball ===
The Birdville Hawks Baseball Team plays in Texas Division 5A Baseball. They host their games at the Hawk Yard in North Richland Hills, Texas.

=== Volleyball ===
The Birdville Lady Hawks Volleyball Team plays in Texas Division 5A Girls Volleyball.

=== Marching band ===
The Birdville High School Mighty Hawk Band has put a show on the field every year since 1999.

=== Theatre ===
The Birdville StageHawks participate in the 5A UIL One Act Play contest annually, and submit their other productions to the Betty Buckley Awards, Schmidt & Jones Awards, and Broadway Dallas.

The troupe was the sole representative of the state of Texas at the Chapter Select One Act Showcase of the 2025 International Thespian Festival. They performed an original play, When Night Falls, after placing first at the state level. The Texas House of Representatives recognized their unique distinction.

=== Other programs ===
- Track and Field
- Birdville Lady Hawks Softball team holds the only State Championship for Birdville High School. They won the UIL State Title in Austin in 2016.
- Girls Soccer
- Tennis team
- Boys Soccer
- Swim team
- Golf team
- Men's Gymnastics
- Women's Gymnastics
- Wrestling team
- Tennis
- Art Club
- Choir
- Golden Motion Dance Team
- NXT LVL Dance Team
- Varsity & JV Cheer Teams
- JROTC

== Notable alumni ==
- Anthony Bardon, international soccer player who played for the Gibraltar national football team
- Clayton Beeter, baseball player in the New York Yankees organization
- Jonathan Stickland, former member of the Texas House of Representatives from District 92 in Tarrant County
- Logan Henderson, actor and member of Big Time Rush
