= Hurst, Texas =

- City
- City of Hurst
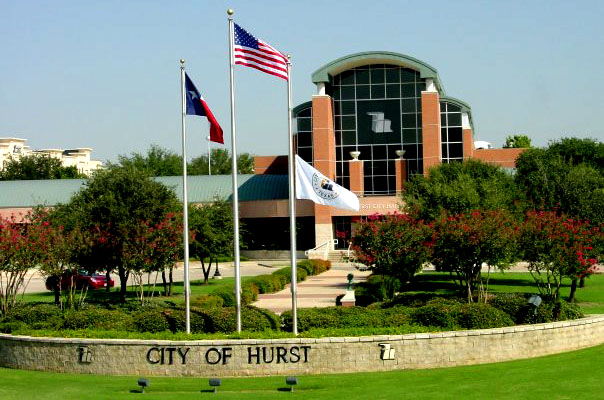
- The City Hall of Hurst, Texas.

- Seal

- Location of Hurst in Tarrant County, Texas
- Coordinates: 32°51′20″N 97°10′49″W
- Country: United States
- State: Texas
- County: Tarrant

Government
  - Type: Council-Manager

Area
  - Total: 9.97 sq mi (25.83 km^{2})
  - Land: 9.97 sq mi (25.81 km^{2})
  - Water: 0.012 sq mi (0.03 km^{2})
- Elevation: 564 ft (172 m)

Population (2020)
  - Total: 40,413
  - Density: 3,879.5/sq mi (1,497.88/km^{2})
- Time zone: UTC-6 (CST)
  - Summer (DST): UTC-5 (CDT)
- ZIP codes: 76053-54, 76180
- Area codes: 682, 817
- FIPS code: 48-35576
- GNIS feature ID: 2410083
- Website: https://www.hursttx.gov/

Hurst is a city in the U.S. state of Texas located in the densely populated portion of northeastern Tarrant County and is part of the Dallas–Fort Worth metropolitan area. It is considered a Dallas and Fort Worth suburb and is part of the Mid-Cities region. It is 13 miles from the Dallas/Fort Worth International Airport. As of the 2020 census, it had a population of 40,413.

The city of Hurst is surrounded by other communities including Bedford, Euless, Fort Worth, Richland Hills, North Richland Hills, Grapevine, and Colleyville. Hurst's education system is sponsored and served by the Hurst-Euless-Bedford Independent School District, while other school districts Grapevine-Colleyville ISD and Birdville ISD serve the far north and far west portions.

Places of importance inside Hurst include the Tarrant County College campus that was built in 1961, the newly constructed Tarrant County Northeast Courthouse, the headquarters of Bell Helicopter (considered to be in the city limits of Fort Worth), the Hurst/Bell Station (opened in September 2000) that is jointly owned by the Dallas Area Rapid Transit and the Trinity Railway Express. The city's premier shopping center, North East Mall that was ranked the #1 Shopping Mall in Tarrant County and is the third largest mall in the state of Texas. The North East Mall opened in March 1972 (sources vary), is owned by the Indianapolis-based Simon Property Group. Hurst's only cinema complex, the North East Cinemark Rave 18 opened in 2004.

Respectively in 2012, Hurst was ranked at #48 as one of the Best Dallas Suburbs according to D Magazine.

== Demographics ==
Historical population
Census	Pop.	Note	%±
1960	10,165		—
1970	27,215		167.7%
1980	31,420		15.5%
1990	33,574		6.9%
2000	36,273		8.0%
2010	37,337		2.9%
2020	40,413		8.2%
2023 (est.)	39,304		−2.7%
U.S. Decennial Census

=== Racial and ethnic composition ===
Racial composition as of the 2020 census
Race	Number	Percent
White	25,204	62.4%
Black or African American	4,116	10.2%
American Indian and Alaska Native	354	0.9%
Asian	1,228	3.0%
Native Hawaiian and Other Pacific Islander	240	0.6%
Some other race	3,662	9.1%
Two or more races	5,609	13.9%
Hispanic or Latino (of any race)	9,780	24.2%

=== 2020 census ===
As of the 2020 census, Hurst had a population of 40,413. The median age was 38.7 years. 23.4% of residents were under the age of 18 and 17.1% of residents were 65 years of age or older. For every 100 females there were 93.8 males, and for every 100 females age 18 and over there were 91.1 males age 18 and over.

100.0% of residents lived in urban areas, while 0.0% lived in rural areas.

There were 15,628 households in Hurst, of which 32.7% had children under the age of 18 living in them. Of all households, 48.6% were married-couple households, 17.4% were households with a male householder and no spouse or partner present, and 27.8% were households with a female householder and no spouse or partner present. About 26.1% of all households were made up of individuals and 11.2% had someone living alone who was 65 years of age or older.

There were 16,309 housing units, of which 4.2% were vacant. The homeowner vacancy rate was 1.0% and the rental vacancy rate was 6.3%.

== Government ==
=== Local government ===
Hurst runs on a city council – manager system. The city has a council of seven members, each serving 2-year terms. Three members are elected in odd years, four in even years.

The city of Hurst is a voluntary member of the North Central Texas Council of Governments association, the purpose of which is to coordinate individual and collective local governments and facilitate regional solutions, eliminate unnecessary duplication, and enable joint decisions.

== Economy ==
=== Top employers ===
According to Hurst's 2021 Annual Comprehensive Financial Report, the principal employers in the city are:

#	Employer	# of Employees
1	Bell Helicopter Textron, Inc.	3,800
2	North East Mall (aggregate not major employers listed)	1,706
3	Shops at North East Mall	800
4	Hurst-Euless-Bedford Independent School District	640
5	Tarrant County College	575
6	Walmart	479
7	City of Hurst	412
8	Dillard's	338
9	Macy's	231
10	JC Penney	225

== Education ==
Most of Hurst is within the boundaries of the Hurst-Euless-Bedford Independent School District. HEB ISD's Lawrence D. Bell High School is the only high school in the city and serves more than 2,100 students. Smaller portions of Hurst are within the boundaries of Birdville ISD, Grapevine-Colleyville ISD, and Keller ISD.

Sections in GCISD are zoned to: Bransford Elementary School, Colleyville Middle School, and Grapevine High School.

The Northeast Campus of Tarrant County College is located in Hurst, and has grown from 8,053 students in 1976–1977 to serve 13,198 students in 2016–2017.

== Notable people ==
- Dennis Allen, Head coach of the New Orleans Saints
- Kyle Bartsch, former professional baseball pitcher
- Ron Faurot, former NFL and University of Arkansas standout
- Marshall Henderson, basketball player at Ole Miss
- Tommy Maddox, former NFL and XFL quarterback
- Alex Reymundo, comedian
- Olivia Scott Welch, actress
- Buddy Whittington, Texas blues guitarist (with John Mayall's Bluesbreakers)

== Places ==
- North East Mall
- Chisholm Park
- Artisan Center Theater (former)
