= Haltom High School =

Location
- 5501 Haltom Road; Haltom City, Texas 76137; United States; 32°50′54″N 97°16′46″W

Information
- School district: Birdville Independent School District
- Superintendent: Dr Gayle Stinson
- Principal: Michell Sheasley
- Teaching staff: 170.27 (FTE)
- Grades: 9–12
- Enrollment: 2,755 (2023–2024)
- Student to teacher ratio: 16.18
- Colors: Orange, black, and white
- Athletics: UIL 6A District 3
- Nickname: Buffaloes
- Website: Official Website

Haltom High School is a grade 9–12 high school located in Haltom City, Texas.

== Athletics ==
The Haltom mascot is the Buffalo, and school colors are black, orange, and white. For the biennium 2020-2022, the Texas UIL classified the school as 6A, and assigned the school's sports teams to District 3 (6A-3).

== History ==
Originally known as Birdville Academy when it opened in 1858, Haltom High School was named Birdville High School when Birdville ISD was incorporated in 1926. It was the only high school in the district until Richland High School opened in the fall of 1961. The original high school was located on a triangular piece of property atop Birdville Hill, where the Birdville ISD district offices, Birdville Stadium, and Birdville Auditorium are still located.

A bond election in May 1986 authorized the district to purchase land and construct a new Haltom High School. The new school was built on Haltom Road, approximately one-half mile north of Interstate 820. The new campus opened for classes in the fall of 1989. The old Haltom High School was renovated, and became Shannon Alternative High School.

An almost 400,000 square foot renovation and expansion of the Haltom Road campus was completed in 2010, adding a new wing and expanding the main building. Additional buildings were added that house science labs, classrooms, administration areas, and band and orchestra halls.

== Notable alumni ==
- Lance Dunbar, NFL running back
- Kelvin Garmon, NFL offensive guard
- Halapoulivaati Vaitai, NFL offensive tackle
- Cody Jinks, country singer
- Rickey Hill, minor league baseball player
