= North Richland Hills, Texas =

- City
- City of North Richland Hills
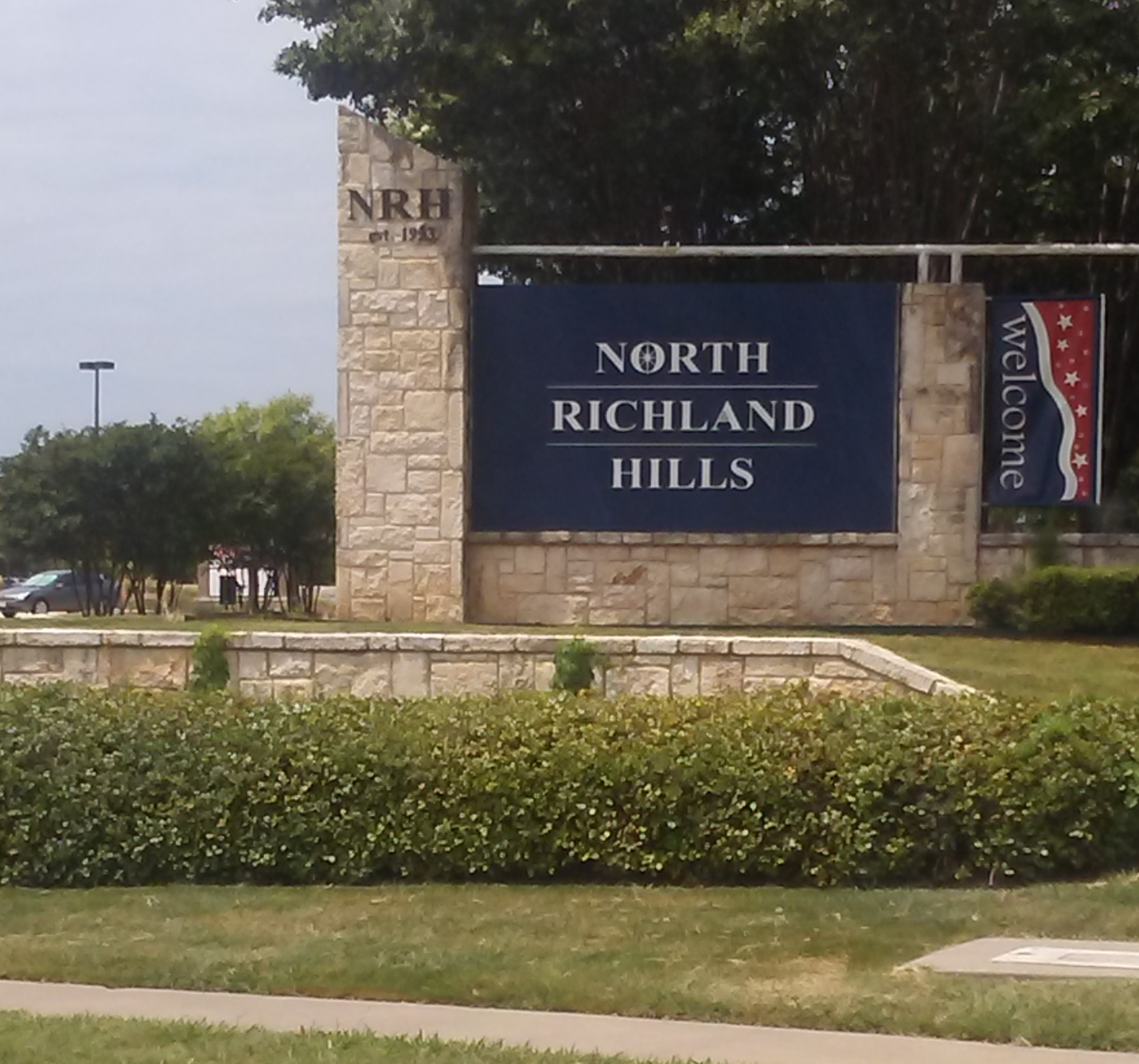
- North Richland Hills city entryway sign at the corner of North Tarrant Parkway and Precinct Line Road.

- Seal
- Nickname: NRH
- Motto: "The Standard"
- Location of North Richland Hills in Tarrant County, Texas
- Coordinates: 32°51′30″N 97°13′05″W
- Country: United States
- State: Texas
- County: Tarrant
- Founded: 1849
- Incorporated: 1953

Government
  - Type: Council-Manager

Area
  - Total: 18.21 sq mi (47.16 km^{2})
  - Land: 18.43 sq mi (47.74 km^{2})
  - Water: 0.042 sq mi (0.11 km^{2}) 0.16%
- Elevation: 630 ft (190 m)

Population (2020)
  - Total: 69,917
  - Estimate (2021): 70,209
  - Density: 3,860/sq mi (1,492/km^{2})
- Time zone: UTC-6 (CST)
  - Summer (DST): UTC-5 (CDT)
- ZIP codes: 76053-54, 76117, 76184, 76180, 76182
- Area code: 817
- FIPS code: 48-52356
- GNIS feature ID: 2411278
- Website: nrhtx.com

North Richland Hills, commonly known as NRH, is a city in the U.S. state of Texas, located in Tarrant County. It is a mid-to-high end suburb of Fort Worth and forms part of the Mid-Cities region of the Dallas-Fort Worth Metroplex. The population was 69,917 at the 2020 census, making it the third largest city in Tarrant County.

The 2025-2026 Best Places to Live as ranked by U.S. News & World Report places North Richland Hills #64 in the nation and #19 in Texas. North Richland Hills was also named one of 2025's Most Livable Small Cities in America by SmartAsset, ranking #48 out of 279 small cities (population 65,000 to 1000,000) evaluated. It was one of only two Texas cities to make the top 50, along with Flower Mound.

In 2006, North Richland Hills was selected as one of the "Top 100 Best Places to live in America" according to Money magazine. In 2016, the Dallas Morning News ranked North Richland Hills #9 on its list of best Dallas–Fort Worth neighborhoods. In 2012, North Richland Hills was ranked at #44 as one of the Best Dallas Suburbs according to D Magazine.

Major streets and highways include: FM 1938 (Davis Boulevard), Mid Cities Boulevard, Bedford-Euless Road, Interstate Highway 820, North Tarrant Parkway, FM 3029 (Precinct Line Road), and TX SH 26. It is home to the Birdville Independent School District, and the northern portion is served by Keller ISD.

NRH notably houses the headquarters of HealthMarkets, Give Me The Vin and GRITR Sports & Outdoors. North Richland Hills features popular businesses and locations, including Peppa Pig Theme Park Dallas Fort Worth, Malibu Jack's Indoor Theme Park, NRH_{2}O Family Water Park, Iron Horse Golf Course, NYTEX Sports Centre - home of the Lone Star Brahmas hockey team, Medical City North Hills, and its own state-of-the-art public library and recreation center. Additionally, NRH is surrounded by numerous communities, such as Haltom City, Keller, Hurst, Colleyville, and Southlake. It also housed the now-demolished North Hills Mall, which ceased operations in 2004. As of 2016, that site is now the new location of the North Richland Hills City Hall.

== History ==
The community began when W.S. Peters agreed to bring 600 families into the area within a three-year period as part of a land grant. Families began arriving in the summer of 1848. In 1849, Tarrant County was established and named for General Edward H. Tarrant. The community of Birdville (adjacent to what is now the southwest boundary of North Richland Hills) was named the first county seat. The area remained a rural farming and ranching community for more than 100 years.

In 1952, Clarence Jones began to subdivide his 268-acre (1.08 km^{2}) dairy farm into a suburban addition in the area that is now Cummings Drive. In 1953, the North Richland Hills Civic League sought to have the area annexed to Richland Hills, then voted to form their own city when annexation was denied. An election was held, and the 268 acres (1.08 km^{2}) of the Jones Farm, with a population of 500, became officially incorporated as the City of North Richland Hills.

The first section of streets in North Richland Hills was named for the local families. The second section, which was added in 1954, was named for automobiles. There were 188 homes in the first part of the subdivision, which was restricted to brick and masonry construction.

By 1957, the North Richland Hills' boundary was within 2 miles (3 km) of Smithfield, and by 1960, Smithfield had been annexed into North Richland Hills. In 1960, the population of North Richland Hills was beginning to rise at 8,662 residents, with that number more than doubling to 16,514 by 1970. The city's population continued to grow at a rapid pace, with the 1980 census at 30,592, and the 1990 census reflecting 45,895. In 2000, the population was at 55,635, and rise to 63,343 at the 2010 census. In 2020, the population was at 69,917.

== Geography ==
According to the United States Census Bureau, the city has a total area of 18.2 square miles (47.2 km^{2}), of which 18.2 square miles (47.1 km^{2}) is land, and 0.04 square miles (0.1 km^{2}), or 0.24%, is water.

== Demographics ==
Historical population
Census	Pop.	Note	%±
1960	8,662		—
1970	16,514		90.6%
1980	30,592		85.2%
1990	45,895		50.0%
2000	55,635		21.2%
2010	63,343		13.9%
2020	69,917		10.4%
2021 (est.)	70,209		0.4%
U.S. Decennial Census; 2020 Census

=== 2020 census ===
As of the 2020 census, North Richland Hills had a population of 69,917 and 18,919 families. The median age was 39.3 years. 22.2% of residents were under the age of 18 and 16.7% of residents were 65 years of age or older. For every 100 females there were 94.3 males, and for every 100 females age 18 and over there were 91.2 males age 18 and over.

100.0% of residents lived in urban areas, while 0.0% lived in rural areas.

There were 27,347 households in North Richland Hills, of which 31.2% had children under the age of 18 living in them. Of all households, 52.0% were married-couple households, 16.1% were households with a male householder and no spouse or partner present, and 26.1% were households with a female householder and no spouse or partner present. About 24.6% of all households were made up of individuals and 10.3% had someone living alone who was 65 years of age or older.

There were 28,691 housing units, of which 4.7% were vacant. The homeowner vacancy rate was 1.2% and the rental vacancy rate was 7.2%.

Racial composition as of the 2020 census
Race	Number	Percent
White	48,427	69.3%
Black or African American	4,902	7.0%
American Indian and Alaska Native	549	0.8%
Asian	2,957	4.2%
Native Hawaiian and Other Pacific Islander	195	0.3%
Some other race	4,057	5.8%
Two or more races	8,830	12.6%
Hispanic or Latino (of any race)	13,158	18.8%

== Economy ==
=== Top employers ===
According to the city's 2023 Annual Comprehensive Financial Report,

#	Employer	# of Employees
1	City of North Richland Hills	884
2	Wal-Mart Supercenters	724
3	Birdville Independent School District	711
4	Medical City North Hills	615
5	Tarrant County College (Northeast Campus)	485
6	HealthMarkets	452
7	Tyson Foods	380
8	XPO, Inc.	260
9	Portfolio Recovery Associates	233
10	Smurfit Kappa	200

== Education ==
Children who live in North Richland Hills attend schools in the Birdville Independent School District. The northernmost part of the city is served by the Keller Independent School District. North Richland Hills has two public high schools: Richland High School and Birdville High School.

Private schools in North Richland Hills include: Fort Worth Christian School, St. John the Apostle Catholic School (of the Roman Catholic Diocese of Fort Worth), North Park Christian Academy, and North Richland Hills Montessori.

The Tarrant County College Northeast Campus is located on the North Richland Hills and Hurst border at 828 Harwood Road.

== Government ==
=== Local government ===
North Richland Hills operates under a charter adopted in 1964, which provides for a "Council-Manager" form of government. The council is composed of a Mayor and seven Council Members elected at large. The Council determines the overall goals and objectives for the city, establishes policies, and adopts the city's annual operating budget. The City Manager oversees the day-to-day operations of the city.

The structure of the management and coordination of city services is:

City Department	Director
City Manager	Paulette Hartman
Assistant City Manager	Trudy Lewis
Assistant City Manager	Caroline Waggoner
Police Chief	Jeff Garner
Fire Chief	Stan Tinney

The city of North Richland Hills is a voluntary member of the North Central Texas Council of Governments association, the purpose of which is to coordinate individual and collective local governments, and facilitate regional solutions, eliminate unnecessary duplication, and enable joint decisions.

== Public services ==
=== North Richland Hills Fire Department / Emergency Medical Services ===
The North Richland Hills Fire Department (NRHFD), also called the North Richland Hills Fire-Rescue (NRHFR), is a public health service geared towards combating uncontrolled fires. In addition to its role as a fire department, it acts like a traditional EMS service, and is dispatched to a wide range of medical emergencies unrelated to fires. To accomplish this mix of roles, all NRHFD staff are cross-trained as firefighters and paramedics; likewise, all vehicles that they employ carry advanced life support equipment. The department is recognized as a “Best Practices” department by the Texas Fire Chiefs Association and holds an ISO rating of 1.

=== North Richland Hills Police Department ===
The North Richland Hills Police Department (NRHPD) works in partnership with residents to maintain a safe and peaceful community. The department's vision is to foster a community environment where the public has full faith and confidence in its police force, and where people feel safe and secure. Guided by a philosophy rooted in ethics, integrity, compassion, and accountability, NRHPD is committed to protecting life and property while respecting the rights of all citizens. Officers strive to lead by example, both professionally and within the community, while upholding the highest standards of service.

Along with its core policing duties, NRHPD operates a dispatch center and jail facility that also serves the neighboring cities of Richland Hills, Haltom City, and Watauga. The department is recognized by the Texas Police Chiefs Association's Best Practices Recognition Program, demonstrating its commitment to professionalism, transparency, and continuous improvement.

== Notable people ==
- Mark Brooks, professional golfer and 1996 PGA Champion.
- Sandra Brown, novelist and bestselling author of romance, thriller, and suspense books.
- Kambri Crews, author of Burn Down the Ground: A Memoir, in which North Richland Hills is featured.
- Clint Ford, actor, voice over artist, and writer.
- Trent Grisham, outfielder for the New York Yankees
- Logan Henderson, actor and singer, known for his role on Nickelodeon's show Big Time Rush.
- Mike Holloway, winner of Survivor: Worlds Apart, the 30th season of Survivor.
- Alex Lambert, a top-16 finalist during season 9 of singing competition show American Idol.
- Craig Lancaster, journalist and novelist
- Whitney Lynn, contemporary multi-media artist.
- Gary Morris, country music artist, actor.
- Betty Pariso, IFBB professional bodybuilder.
- Rashee Rice, wide receiver for the Kansas City Chiefs.
