= Timber Creek High School (Fort Worth, Texas) =

Location
- 12350 Timberland Boulevard; Fort Worth, Texas 76244; United States; 32.9497°N 97.2876°W

Information
- Type: High School
- Established: September 2009
- School district: Keller Independent School District
- Superintendent: Dr. Cory Wilson
- Principal: Christina Benhoff
- Faculty: 199.47 (FTE)
- Grades: 9-12
- Enrollment: 3,026 (2023-2024)
- Student to teacher ratio: 15.17
- Campus size: 6A
- Campus type: Public high school
- Colors: Purple and Vegas gold
- Team name: Falcons
- Newspaper: Timber Creek Talon
- Yearbook: The Creek
- Feeder schools: Trinity Springs Middle School and Timberview Middle School
- Website: Official website

Timber Creek High School is a public high school located in the city of Fort Worth, Texas which is served by the Keller Independent School District. The campus opened its doors in the fall of 2009 and was Keller ISD's fourth high school. Its first graduating class was in the spring of 2012. In 2015, the school was rated "Met Standard" by the Texas Education Agency.

A majority of the students zoned for TCHS live in the city limits of Fort Worth in an area roughly bordered by Interstate 35 to the west, Highway 170 on the north, Highway 377 to the east, and Heritage Trace Parkway to the south. As of the 2015–2016 school year, the campus housed approximately 3275 students in grades 9–12.

The school coffeeshop, The Daily Grind, opened in 2017, the first of its kind in Keller ISD. Students selected the name of the establishment via a poll on Twitter. The coffeeshop makes a "Falconccino", which is similar to a frappucino with the name referring to the school mascot; a student created the name of the drink. Students also designed the appearance of the coffeeshop.

== Athletics ==
The Timber Creek Falcons compete in these sports:

- Baseball
- Basketball
- Cross country
- Football
- Golf
- Soccer
- Softball
- Swimming and diving
- Tennis
- Track and field
- Volleyball
- Wrestling

During the 2022-2023 School year, 2 students in the Timber Creek Wrestling program went to the state finals, and won first place.

== Theatre ==
Since its inception in 2009, Falcon Theatre has been committed to producing high-quality theatrical performances and fostering student talent.

- 2018 - UIL One Act Play 'W;t' is awarded Second Runner Up at the State Meet.

== Notable alumni ==
- Erik Ezukanma (2018), football player for the Jacksonville Jaguars
- Mateo Gil (2018), baseball player in the New York Mets organization
- Braeden De La Garza (2019), actor known for his roles in The Quest, Cruel Summer and Elsbeth
