= Dallas Area Rapid Transit =

American transit agency

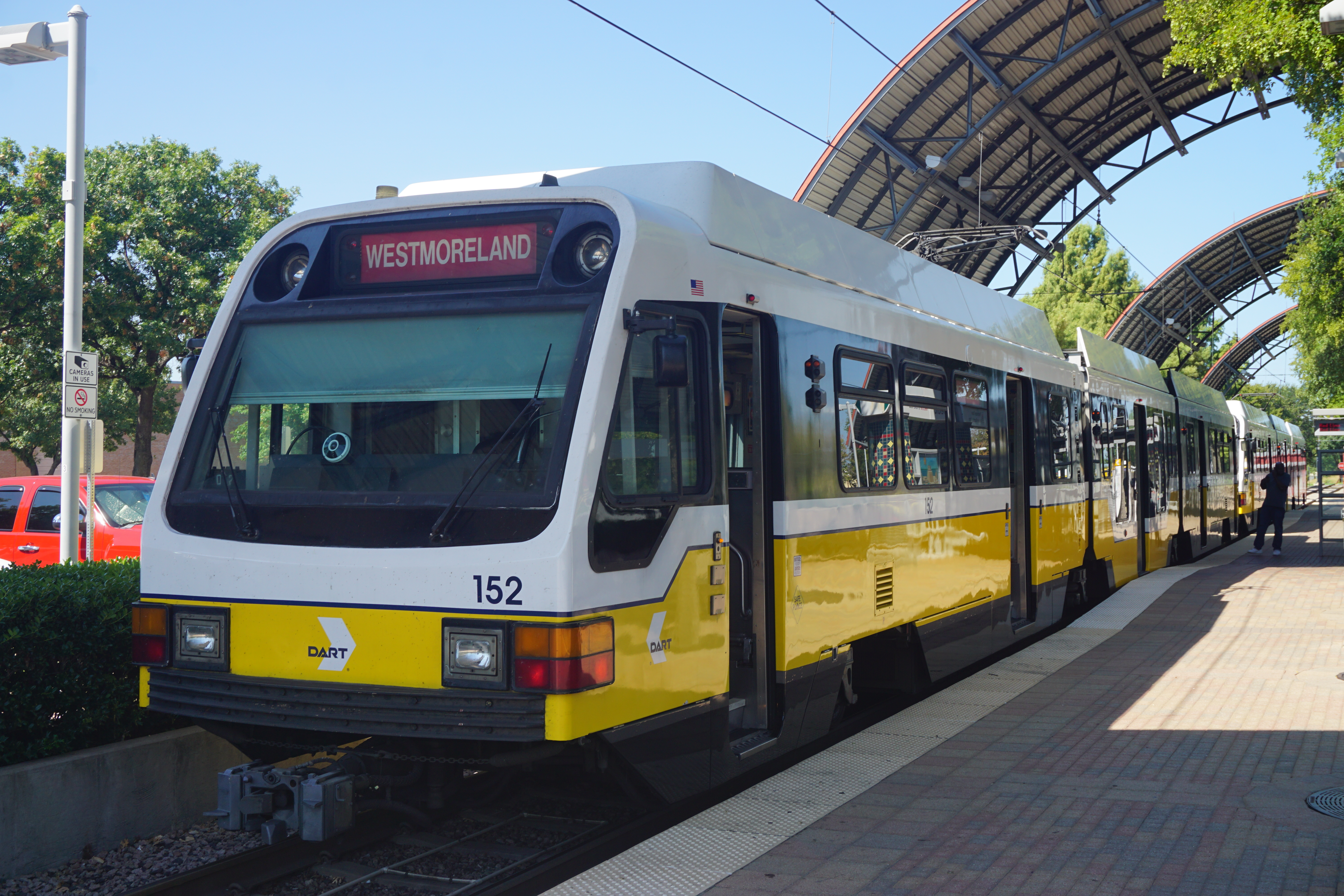

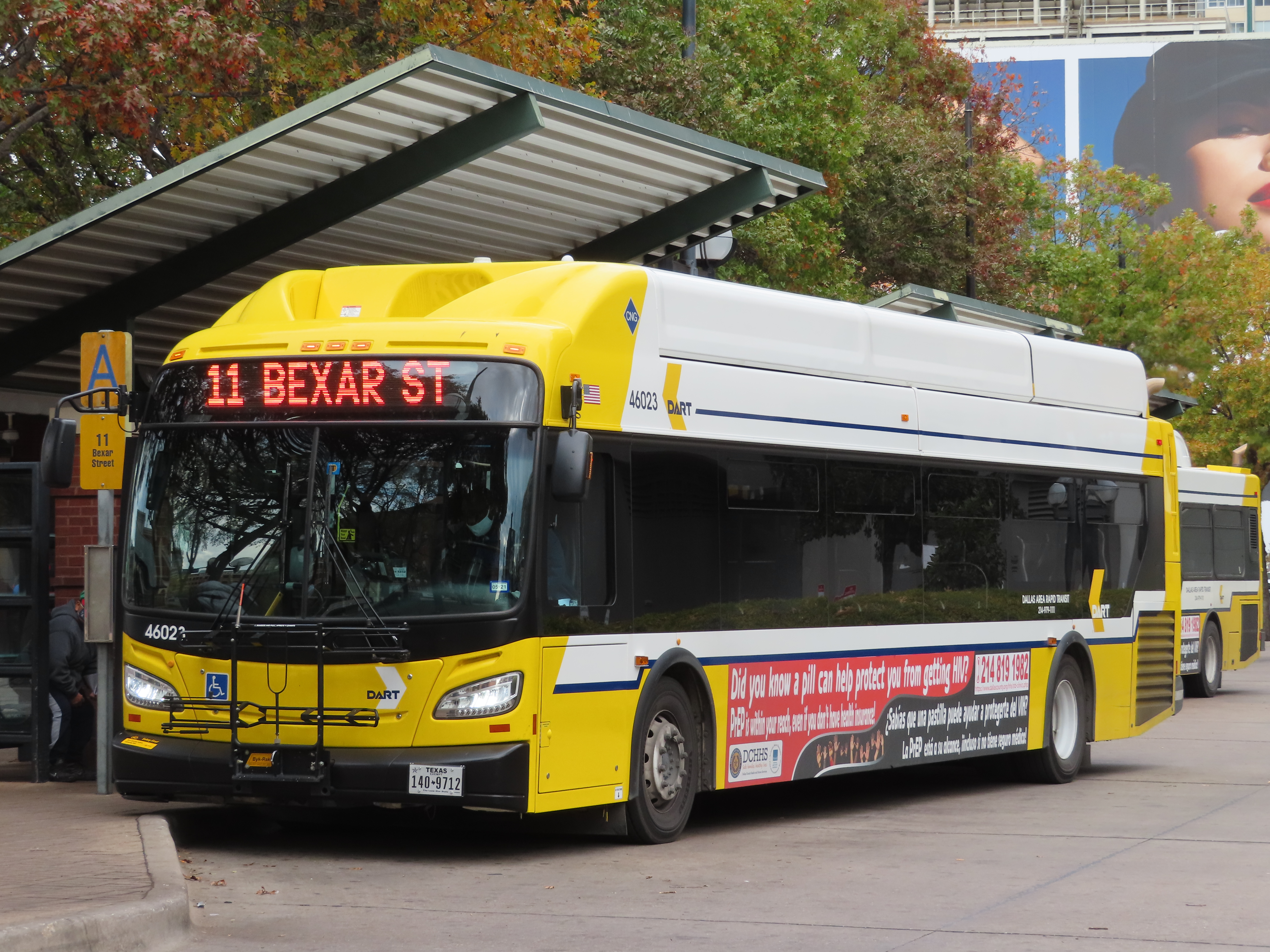

Overview
- Area served: Dallas, Texas and 11 nearby suburbs
- Transit type: Bus, light rail, commuter rail, modern streetcar, curb-to-curb, paratransit
- Number of lines: 91 bus 32 on-demand zones 4 light rail 3 commuter rail 2 modern streetcar
- Daily ridership: 157,300 (weekdays, Q2 2026)
- Annual ridership: 52,823,800 (2025)
- Chief executive: David Leininger (interim)
- Headquarters: 1401 Pacific Avenue; Dallas, Texas
- Website: dart.org

Operation
- Began operation: 1983

Dallas Area Rapid Transit (DART) is a transit agency serving the Dallas–Fort Worth metroplex of Texas. It operates buses, light rail, commuter rail, and high-occupancy vehicle lanes in Dallas and twelve of its suburbs. In 2025, the system had a ridership of 52,823,800, or about 157,300 per weekday as of the second quarter of 2026.

DART was created in 1983 to replace a municipal bus system and funded expansion of the region's transit network through a sales tax levied in member cities. DART rail began operation in 1996 and operates over 93 miles (149.7 km) of track. It was the longest light rail system in the United States until 2023, when it was surpassed by Los Angeles Metro Rail.

DART jointly operates the Trinity Railway Express commuter rail line between Dallas and Fort Worth, with Trinity Metro. The agency also operates the Dallas Streetcar and provides funding for the non-profit M-Line Trolley.

== History ==
=== Precursor agencies ===
The Dallas Transit System (DTS) was a public transit service operated by the city of Dallas, from 1964 to 1983. DTS was formed by the consolidation of various privately owned transit companies and streetcar lines. Prior to DTS, the company was formerly known as the Dallas Railway and Terminal Company when Dallas had an extensive streetcar system that spanned from Oak Cliff to North Dallas. The name was changed shortly after the last streetcar ran in January 1956. DART formally took over operations of the DTS in 1988.

In 2000, DART employees restored a 1966 DTS bus to its original state.

=== Creation of DART ===
DART was created on August 13, 1983, as a regional replacement for the DTS (Although the name "Dallas Area Rapid Transit" was intended to reflect the new agency's coverage of the greater Dallas–Fort Worth metroplex, its acronym DART almost immediately evoked comparisons to San Francisco's Bay Area Rapid Transit system, known as BART). Citizens of 15 area cities had voted to levy a 1% sales tax to join the system by the time it began transit services in 1984 (though the formal acquisition of the Dallas Transit System wouldn't be complete until 1988).

In 1985, member cities Carrollton and Farmers Branch held elections to pull out of DART, though the measures failed. But shifting suburban politics and a loss of confidence in DART management after voters declined to support DART's measure to incur long term debt in 1988 led to seven more pullout votes, two of which (Flower Mound and Coppell) were successful. Just one suburb joined DART – the tiny community of Buckingham, which was later annexed by DART member city Richardson.

=== Financial scandal ===
In December 2007, DART revealed it was facing a $1 billion shortfall in funds earmarked for the Blue Line rail service to Rowlett and Orange Line rail service to Irving, and the DFW Airport.

In January 2008, DART announced it would divert monies from rail lines being built in Dallas. When Dallas officials protested, DART president and executive director Gary Thomas—who had known about the shortfall for at least eight months—announced the agency would borrow more money.

In late January 2008, DART Board chair Lynn Flint Shaw, who was also treasurer of Dallas Mayor Tom Leppert's "Friends of Tom Leppert" fund-raising committee, resigned from her DART post. In February, she surrendered to the police on charges of forgery. On March 10, Shaw and her husband, political analyst Rufus Shaw, were found dead in their home in what turned out to be a murder suicide.

=== 2016 shooting ===
On July 7, 2016, one DART officer was among several people shot in a mass shooting targeting police officers providing security at a Black Lives Matter protest. One of the officers, identified as seven-year veteran Brent Thompson, died from his injuries and became the first DART officer to be killed in the line of duty since the department's inception.

=== New bus network ===
On January 24, 2022, DART's bus network, which had dated back to DART's 1983 incorporation, was completely overhauled. The overhaul, branded as DARTzoom, was intended to improve the bus system's service reach, frequency, and hours of operation. All DARTzoom local routes would be available 5 AM to midnight, seven days a week. The centerpiece of the system was 22 "core frequent" routes, which would be available from 4 AM to 1 AM with 20-minute headways for most of the day and 15-minute headways during peak periods.

DARTzoom saw many short or low-use routes consolidated or removed, and bus stops were re-organized to be a constant distance apart. Eliminated routes were usually replaced with GoLink zones. The system also introduced a new route numbering scheme, which assigned route numbers and colors based on a route's frequency, rather than the previous network's type designations. Only one route (883, a shuttle route sponsored by the University of Texas at Dallas) retained its original designation.

To celebrate the new network and allow riders time to adjust, all rides on the new network were free for the first week of operation.

=== 2026 withdrawal elections ===
In 2023, a study by Ernst & Young detailed each DART member city's sales tax contributions relative to how much DART spent in each on services, highlighting an imbalance where several of the agency's wealthier, suburban members, such as Plano and Highland Park, contribute disproportionally to the agency. In 2025, the Plano City Council, as well as Republican representative Matt Shaheen, asked the state legislature to consider a bill which would redirect 25% of DART's sales tax revenue back to member cities for their own transit projects. This bill, called the "DART killer" by opponents, failed to advance through both chambers, though the city planned to continue to pursue other options. By Fall, Plano had officially begun considering calling an election to leave the agency, explicitly citing the EY study's findings as a primary factor. On November 5, despite substantial opposition from speakers, the council voted 8–0 to schedule a withdrawal election in May 2026. Farmer's Branch and Highland Park had voted to call elections on November 4, while Irving voted to call one on November 6. University Park joined the group on January 6, 2026. Addison became the sixth and final city to call an election on January 28 after having previously rejected calls to do so in December.

The cities that scheduled withdrawal elections primarily planned to replace DART with microtransit services, although some, including Plano, sought agreements to continue limited partnerships with DART to retain access to the agency's rail network, preventing the closure of the stations in their city limits. As a part of negotiations to get the cities to cancel their elections, the Dallas City Council voted to give up the city's majority on DART's governing board, allowing room for greater representation to the agency's smaller cities. The final compromise, which also included returning a smaller portion of cities' sales tax contributions for microtransit services, led Plano, Irving, and Farmer's Branch to cancel their withdrawal elections. Withdrawal elections in the remaining cities were held on May 2, with Addison and University Park voting to stay, while Highland Park voted to leave, becoming the first city to leave the agency since Flower Mound and Coppell did in 1989.

City	Stay	%	Leave	%	Total
Addison	1,500	70.0%	642	30.0%	2,142
Highland Park	468	30.3%	1,078	69.7%	1,546
University Park	1,466	53.7%	1,265	46.3%	2,731

== Light rail ==
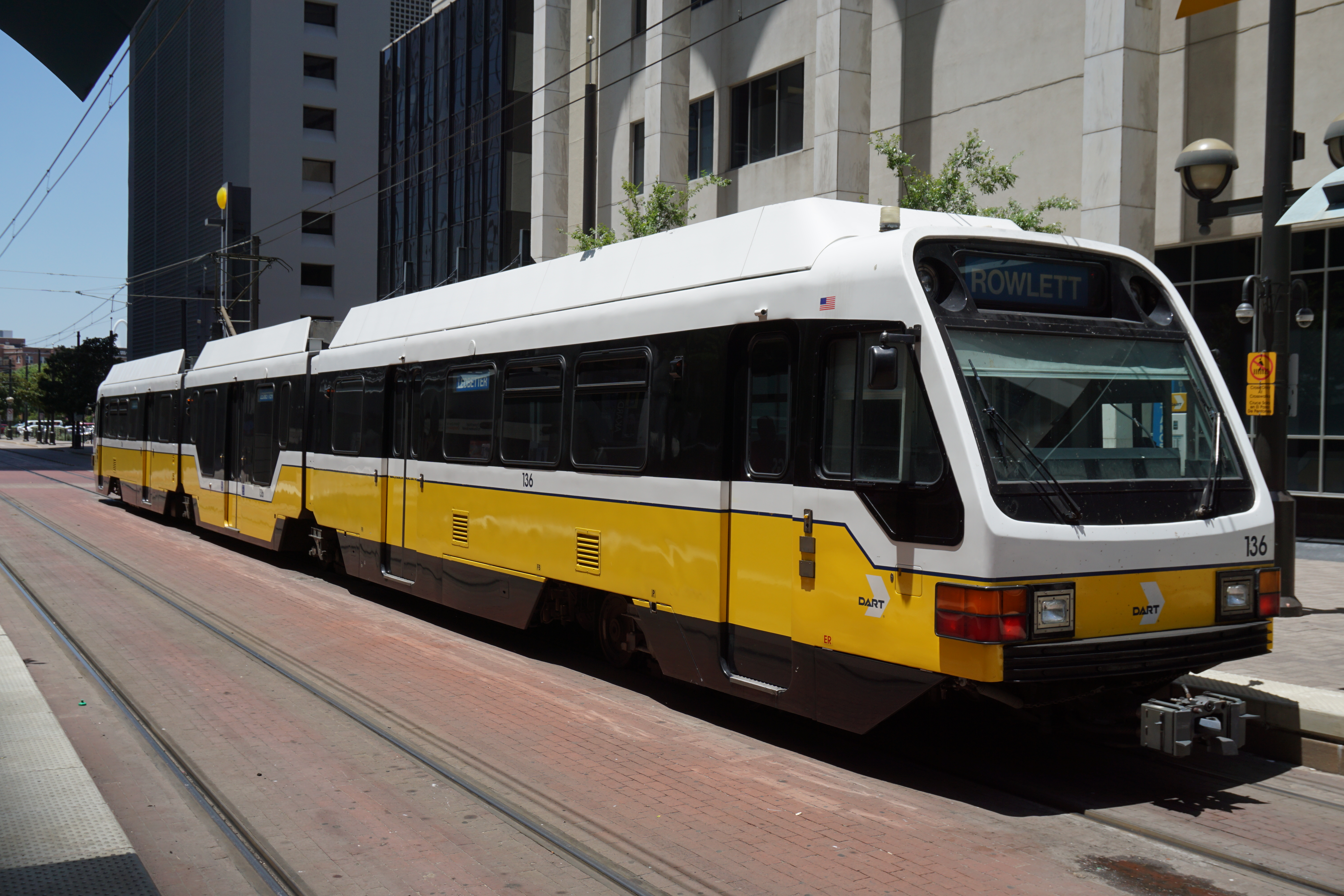
DART Blue Line train at Akard station in downtown Dallas heading towards Downtown Rowlett station

DART's light rail system comprises 93 miles (149.7 km) between four lines, which connect northern suburbs, South Dallas neighborhoods, and Dallas Fort Worth International Airport to Downtown Dallas. The system utilizes custom-built Kinki Sharyo SLRV vehicles, which are electrically powered and feature level boarding in the center segment of the car.

As of the second quarter of 2026, DART light rail has 65,300 average weekday boardings, making it the 8th-most ridden light rail system in the U.S.

DART light rail lines
Line	Description	Length	Stations	Opened	Last extended
Red Line	Plano to West Oak Cliff	27.7 mi (44.6 km)	26	1996	2002
Blue Line	Rowlett to South Oak Cliff	26.8 mi (43.1 km)	23	1996	2016
Green Line	Carrollton to Pleasant Grove	27.5 mi (44.3 km)	24	2009	2010
Orange Line	DFW Airport to Plano	37 mi (60 km)	31	2010	2014

Before the 1983 membership election, DART created a plan for 160 miles (257.5 km) of rail. After several cities (specifically Duncanville, Grand Prairie, and Mesquite) voted not to join the agency and a 1988 bond plan to fund the system failed, DART settled on a pared-down system, consisting of 66 miles (106.2 km) of light rail and 18 miles (29 km) of commuter rail. The first two light rail lines in the system, the Red and Blue Lines, opened in 1996.

== Streetcars ==
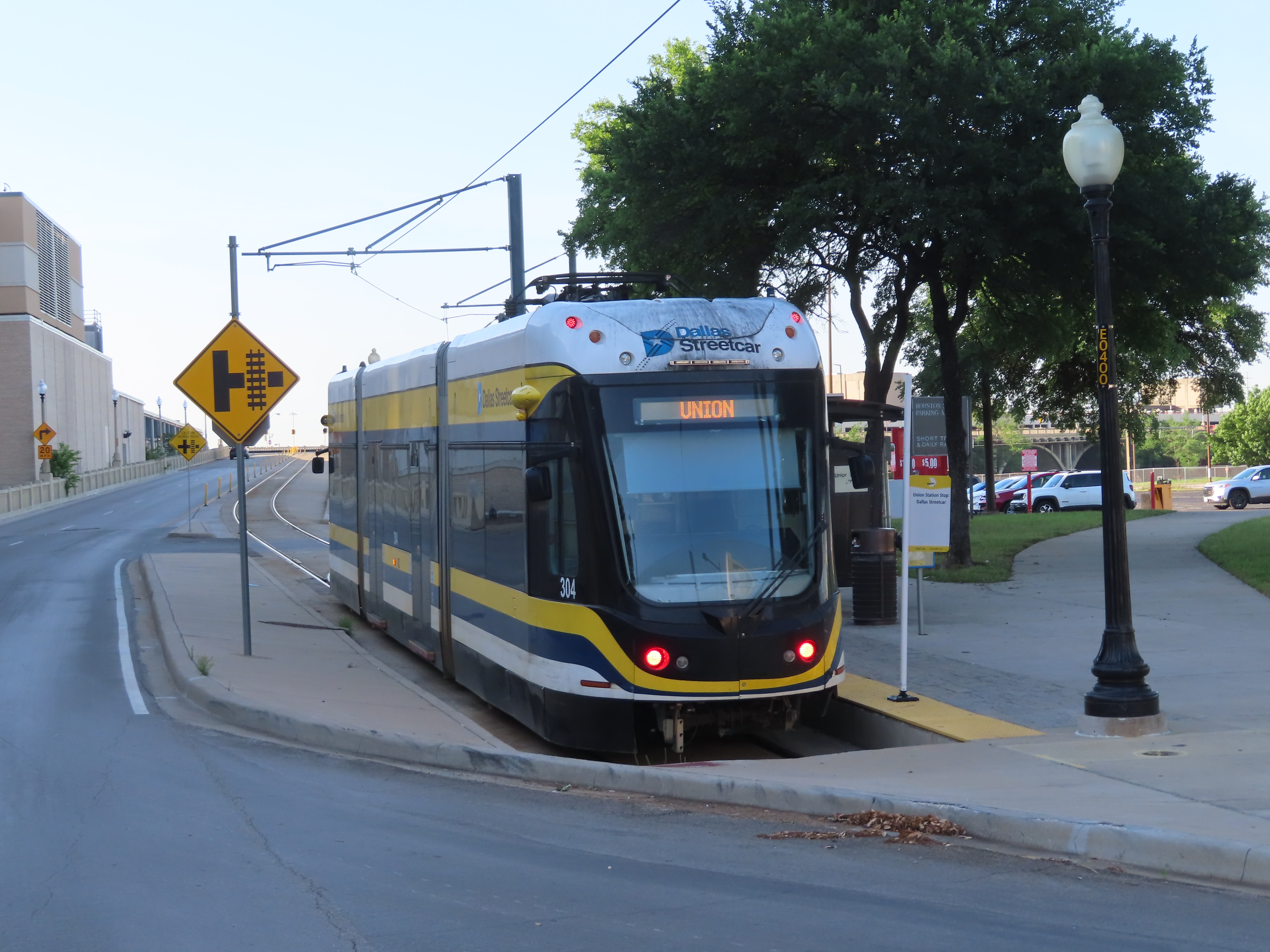
Dallas Streetcar at Union Station

=== Dallas Streetcar ===
The Dallas Streetcar is a 2.45-mile (3.94 km) modern streetcar connecting downtown Dallas to Methodist Dallas Medical Center and Bishop Arts District in northern Oak Cliff. The line connects to DART's Red Line and Blue Line at EBJ Union Station. The line is owned by the city of Dallas and operated by DART under a joint funding agreement.

The streetcar line was built in two phases from May 2013 to August 2016. An extension of the line further into downtown, which would allow for a direct connection to the M-Line Trolley, has been proposed.

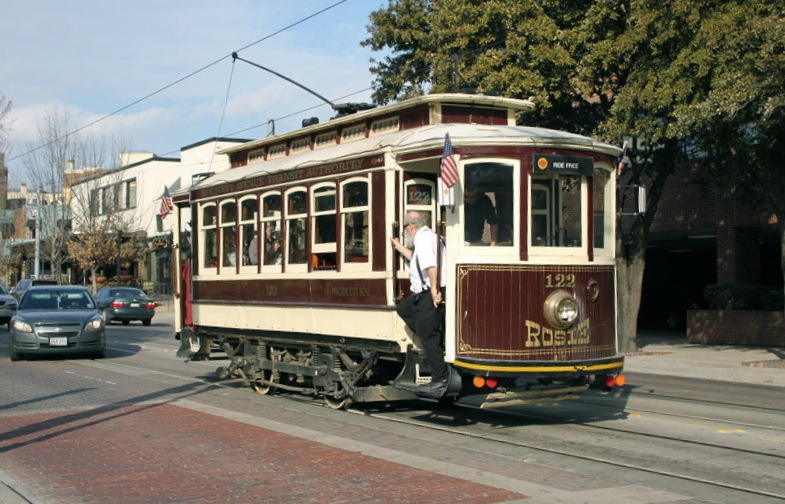
M-Line Trolley in Uptown Dallas

=== M-Line Trolley ===
The M-Line Trolley is a 4.6-mile (7.4 km) heritage streetcar line in Dallas's Uptown neighborhood. The trolley connects to DART light rail at the Cityplace/Uptown and St. Paul stations.

The trolley service is owned and operated by the McKinney Avenue Transit Authority, a private nonprofit, but DART and the Uptown Improvement District provide a joint operating subsidy that allows the service to be fare-free.

== Commuter rail ==
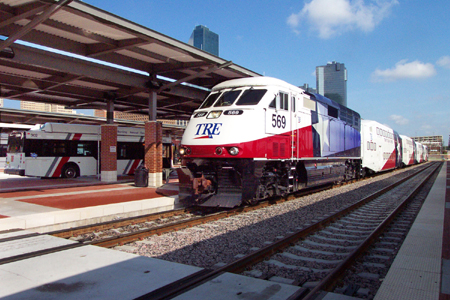
Trinity Railway Express at Fort Worth Central Station.

=== Trinity Railway Express ===
Trinity Railway Express (TRE) is a 34-mile (55 km) commuter rail service connecting downtown Dallas with downtown Fort Worth. The service is jointly operated by DART and Trinity Metro, Fort Worth's transit operator. It was first opened in 1996 and was extended to Fort Worth in late 2001.

TRE connects to four of DART's light rail lines, Fort Worth's TEXRail line, and Dallas Fort Worth International Airport (via bus). Service is available on weekdays and Saturdays with 30–60 minute headways. Sunday service is only available during the State Fair of Texas and other major events.

As of the second quarter of 2026, the TRE has 6,700 average weekday boardings, making it the 17th-most ridden commuter rail system in the U.S.

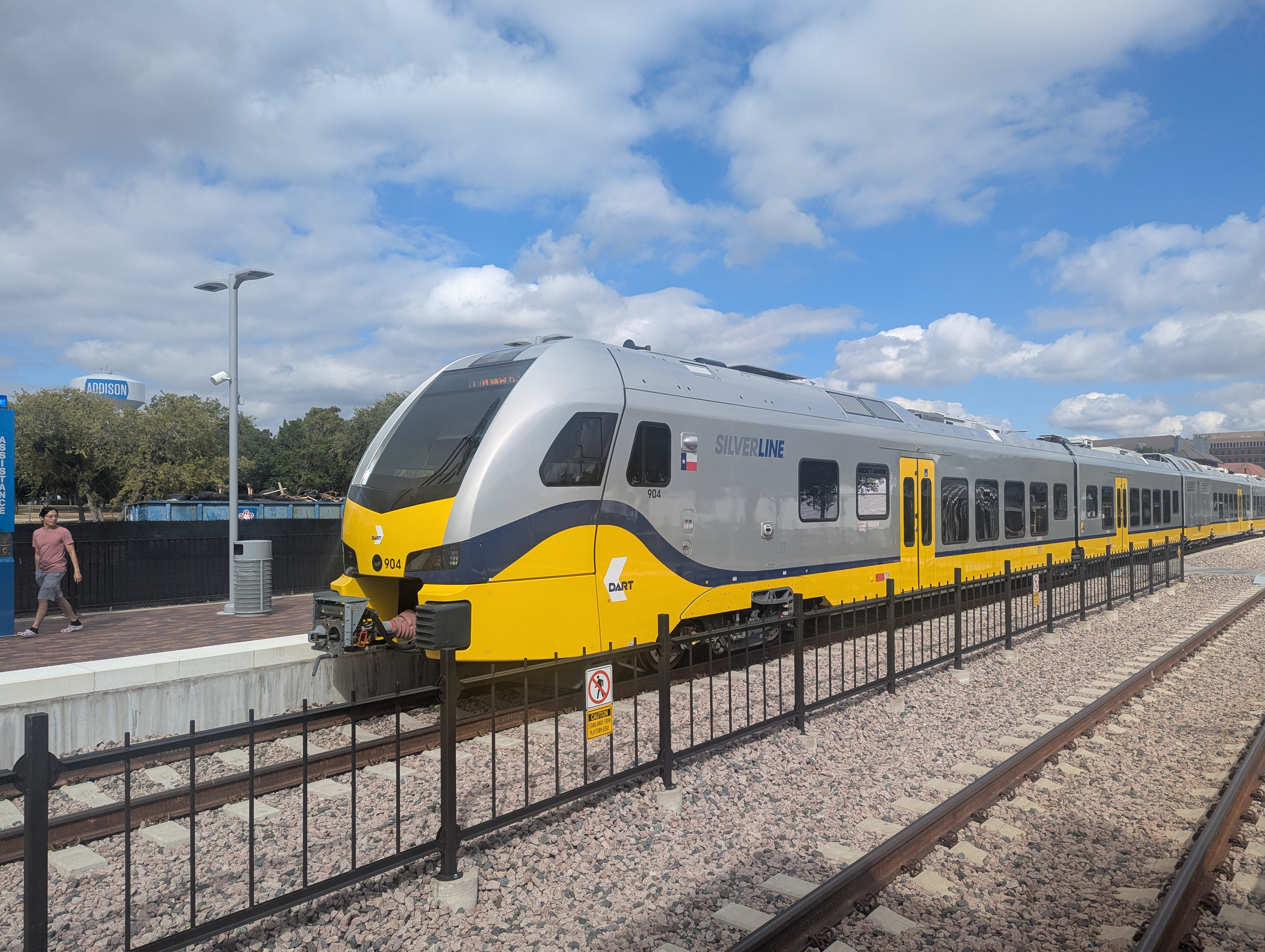
DART Silver Line

=== Silver Line ===
The Silver Line is a 26-mile (42 km) commuter rail service that runs between Dallas Fort Worth International Airport and Plano along a former St. Louis Southwestern corridor. The line, first proposed as part of DART's original 1983 rail plan, opened to passenger service on October 25, 2025. It connects with TEXRail at two locations along the portion of the line where it parallels TEXRail's line near DFW Airport.

Service operates seven days a week with 30–60 minute headways. The Silver Line connects with the DART's Orange, Green, and Red lines providing access to Dallas Love Field, Downtown Dallas via Downtown Carrollton or CityLine/Bush station.

=== A-train ===
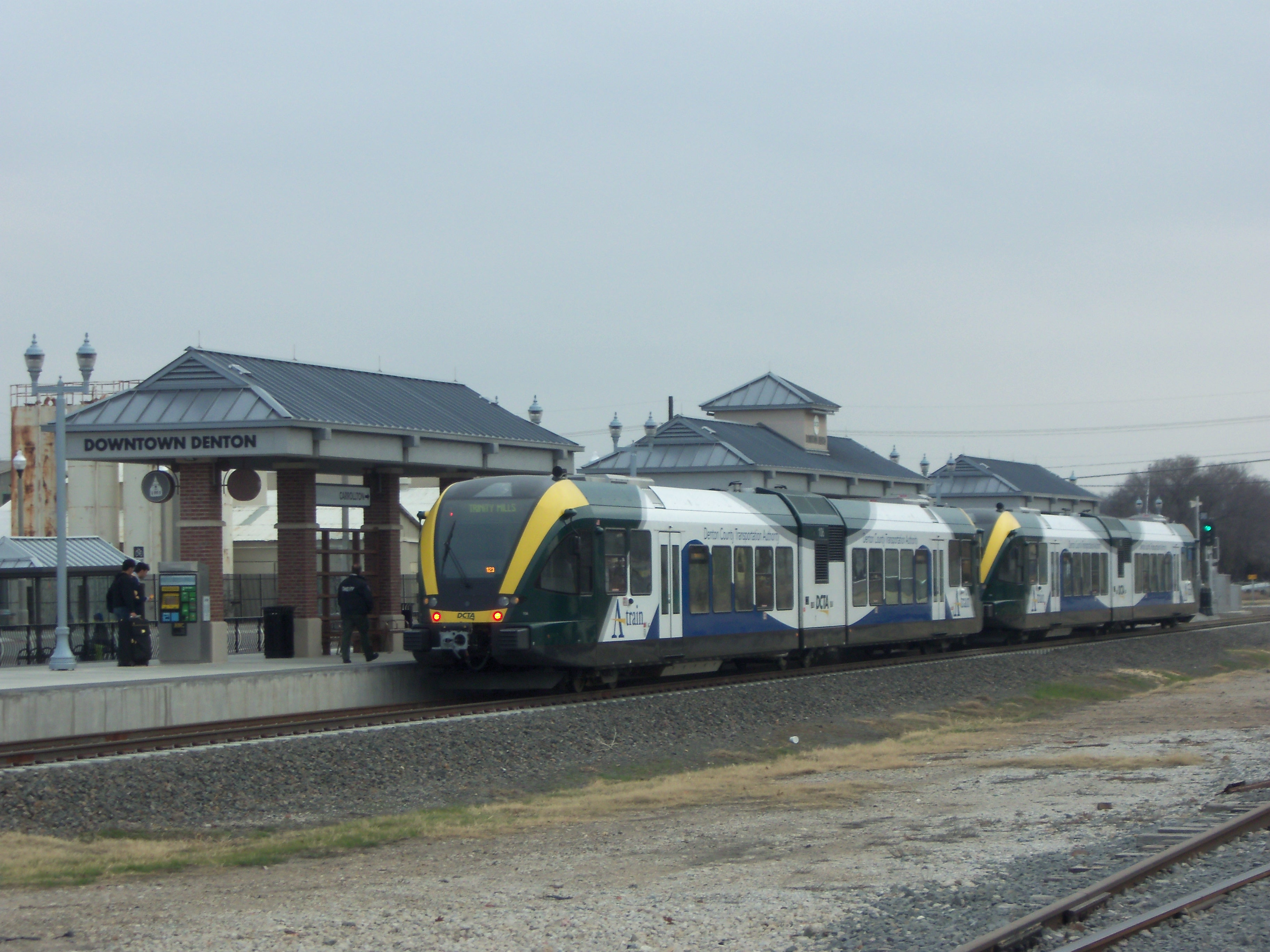
A-train at Downtown Denton Transit Center.

The A-train is a 21-mile (34 km) commuter rail service connecting Denton and Lewisville to DART member Carrollton. The line is operated by the Denton County Transportation Authority (DCTA) on a former Missouri–Kansas–Texas corridor it leases from DART.

The A-train connects with DART's Green Line at Trinity Mills station, which allows further travel to downtown Dallas. Both DART and DCTA sell regional-fare passes which enable travel on both lines.

== Buses ==
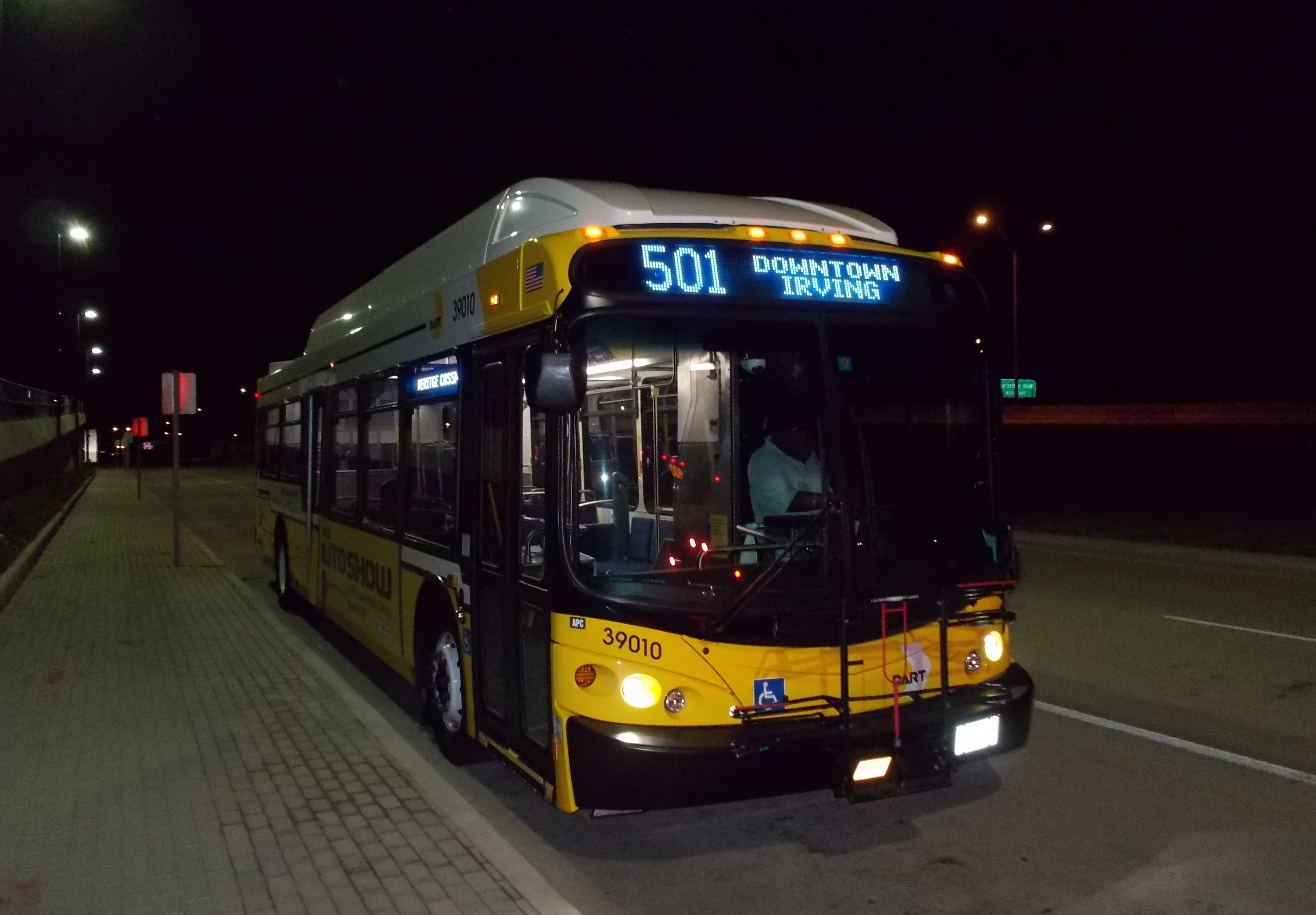
NABI bus awaiting departure from Irving Convention Center Station (2013)

As of 2025, DART operates 75 bus routes, as well as several express routes and shuttle buses.

Most trips in the DART system are carried by the bus network. In the 2022 fiscal year, DART had 72,400 bus trips per average weekday, 54% of the system's total 134,810 trips.

=== Fleet ===
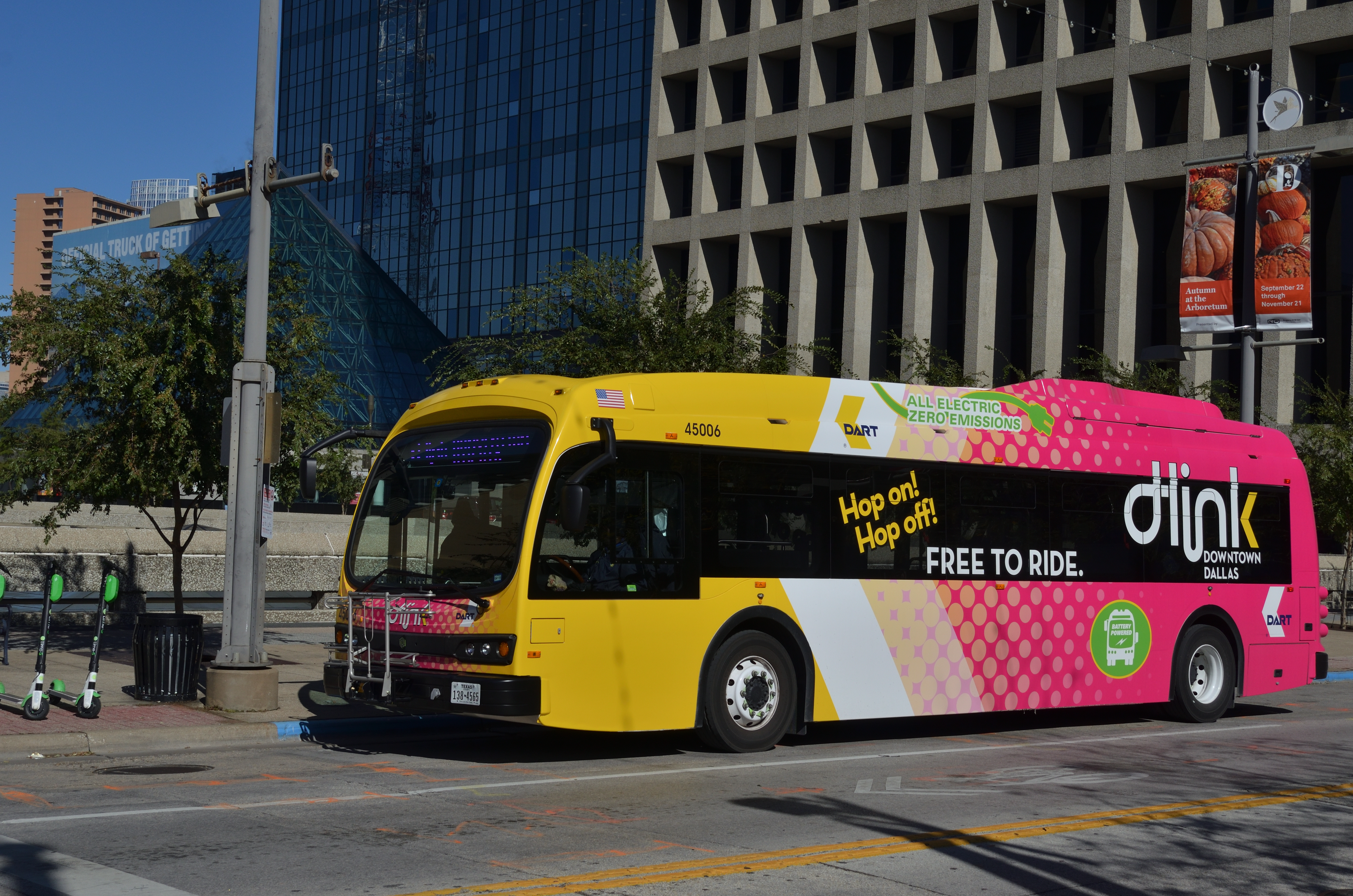
Proterra Catalyst bus in DLink livery (2018)

DART's fleet initially consisted of diesel buses. In 1998, the agency began using liquefied natural gas buses alongside them as part of a broader environmental initiative.

In October 2012, DART introduced a new fleet of 123 low-floor 14-to-17-passenger buses for On-Call, FLEX, and low-capacity routes. The buses were manufactured by ARBOC Specialty Vehicles.

From 2013 to 2017, DART would replace most of its bus fleet with 459 NABI 40LFW buses running off compressed natural gas. The CNG fleet was further bolstered in 2019 with the addition of 41 New Flyer Xcelsior XN40 buses. In 2025, DART announced the purchase of 476 Gillig buses to replace the NABI fleet.

DART introduced electric buses to its fleet in 2018 with seven Proterra Catalyst buses. These buses were originally used for the DLink circulator in downtown Dallas; when DLink was eliminated in 2019, the electric buses were moved to normal routes. In 2023, DART ordered an additional Proterra bus, this time a ZX5 Max, as a trial for long-range electric buses. The buses were retired following Proterra's bankruptcy.

As of 2026, DART’s bus fleet consists of the following:

- Gillig Low Floor CNG 29’
- Gillig Low Floor CNG 40’
- New Flyer XN40
- NABI 31-LFW Gen III CNG
- NABI 40-LFW Gen III CNG

=== Routes ===
Since the 2022 system redesign, DART has three types of routes: local, express, and shuttle. Routes are further color-coded by mid-day frequency.

Category	Route Numbers	Active routes	Frequency (min.)			Notes
Category	Route Numbers	Active routes	Peak	Mid‑day	Off‑Peak	Notes
Local	1–9	4	15	15	30	
Local	10–99	13	20	20	20–30	
Local	100–199	13	20	30	30	
Local	200–299	41	30	40–60	30–60	
Express	300–399	2	20	N/A		Express routes connect suburban bus-only facilities, such as Northwest Plano Park & Ride, to Downtown Dallas using local highways and express/HOV lanes. These routes operate only during peak times.
Shuttle	400–499, 883	9	Varies			Shuttle routes are created on behalf of a sponsor, such as Texas Instruments. The sponsor determines the route's path, hours, and ridership base. Most shuttle routes are operated by a third party, Echo Transportation.

=== Facilities ===
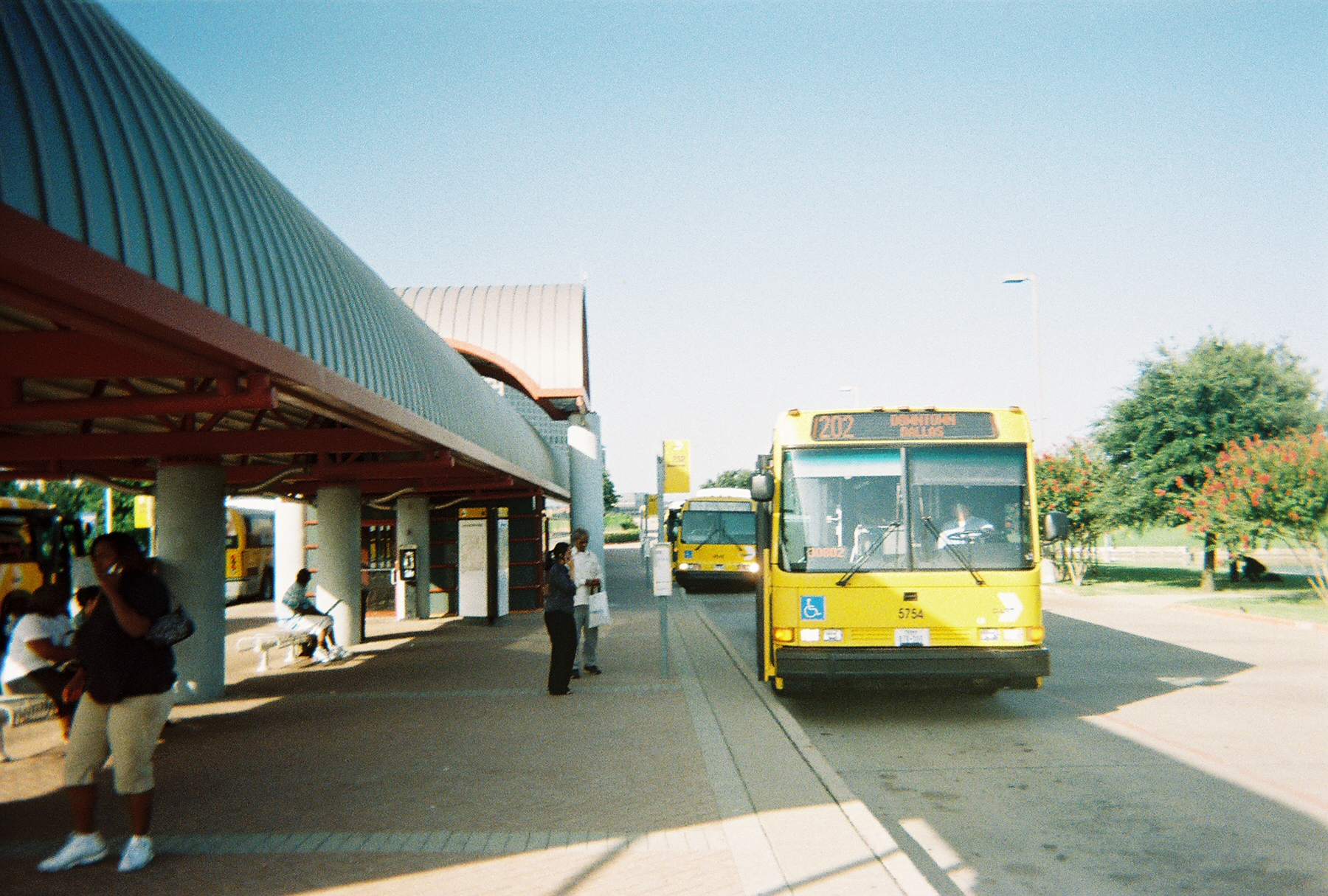
Buses awaiting departure at North Irving Transit Center.

DART runs its bus system similar to the hub-and-spoke model some airlines use, with specified bus-only facilities that serve as timepoints and transfer locations for multiple routes. Many (though not all) of these facilities include park-and-ride lots, air-conditioned waiting areas, vending machines, and bathrooms. Most rail stations also serve as transfer locations for bus routes, albeit with fewer connecting routes and amenities.

- Addison Transit Center (Addison)
- Bernal/Singleton Transfer Location (West Dallas)
- Cockrell Hill Transfer Location (Cockrell Hill)
- East Transfer Center (Downtown Dallas, near Pearl/Arts District)
- Glenn Heights Park and Ride (Glenn Heights)
- Jack Hatchell Transit Center (Plano)
- J. B. Jackson Transit Center (Fair Park)
- Lake Ray Hubbard Transit Center (Garland)
- Malcolm X Boulevard Transfer Location (South Dallas)
- North Irving Transit Center (Irving)
- Northwest Plano Park and Ride (Plano)
- Red Bird Transit Center (South Dallas)
- South Garland Transit Center (Garland)
- West Transfer Center (Downtown Dallas, near West End)

== On-demand services ==
=== DART On-Call (2003–2021) ===
In 2003, DART launched a premium on-call shuttle service to replace many low-use DART bus routes. The service allowed riders to schedule trips to and from any location within designated zones, though it required trips to be scheduled one hour in advance. DART On-Call operated only on non-holiday weekdays.

It was first opened in some North Dallas and Plano neighborhoods and, in late 2005, was expanded to Glenn Heights. When the service was retired in 2021, DART On-Call served north central Plano, eastern Rowlett, Farmers Branch, North Dallas, Lakewood, Richardson, Lake Highlands, and Glenn Heights.

=== FLEX (2008–2021) ===
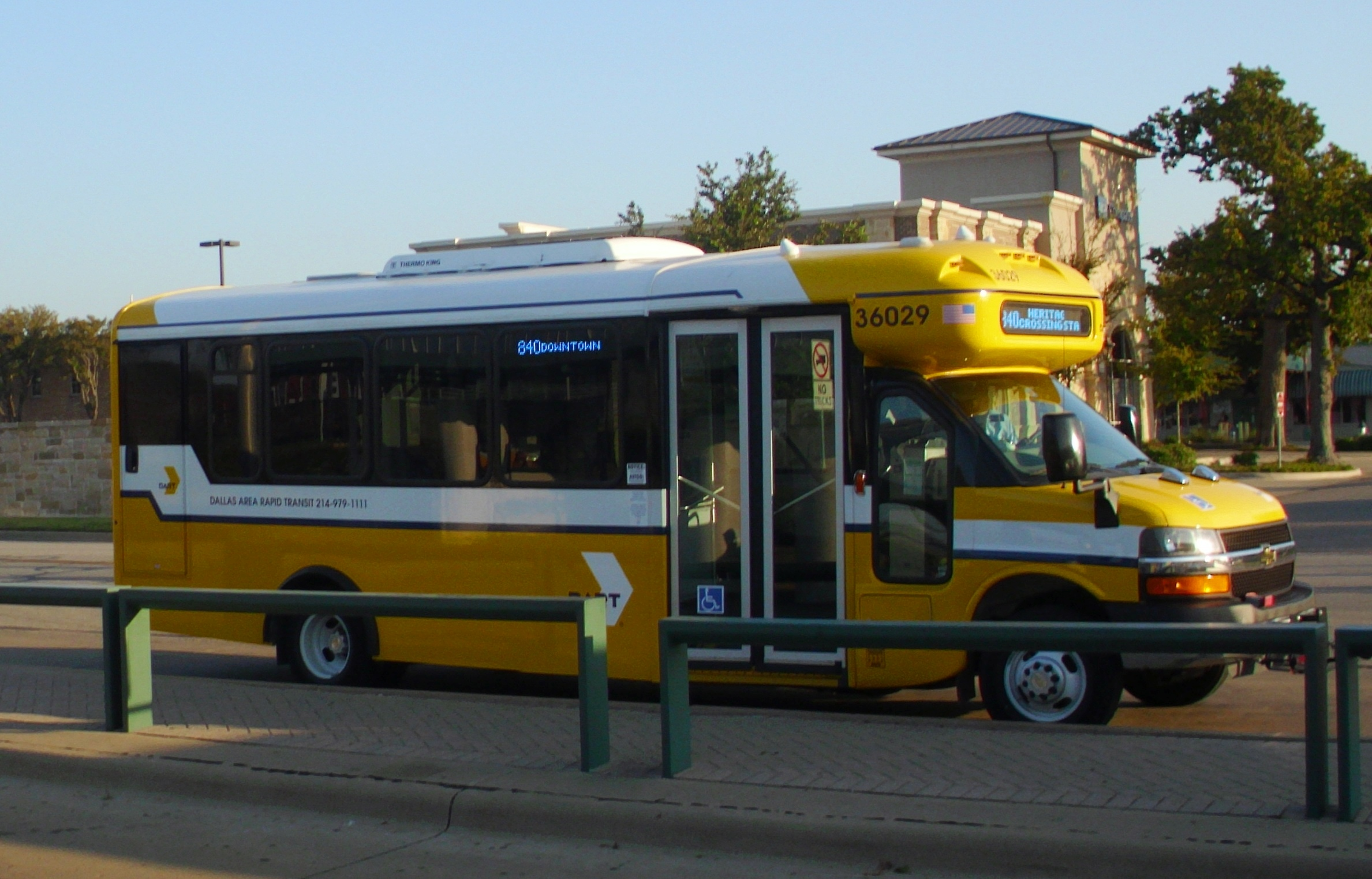
DART introduced smaller buses in October 2012 for On-Call, FLEX, and less-traveled routes.

Introduced in 2008, FLEX was a hybrid of on-call and fixed-route services. The service augmented six routes in Irving, Plano, southeastern Dallas, and the Garland/Rowlett area with designated FLEX areas surrounding the route. A bus could be diverted to any location within its corresponding area, so long as time permitted.

In order to request FLEX service, a passenger needed to pay System fare, which cost double the typical fare. Pickups within a FLEX area needed to be scheduled an hour in advance, though drop-offs within an area could be requested at time of boarding.

=== GoLink (2018–present) ===
In February 2018, GoLink was introduced as a modernized on-demand service, similar to ridesharing apps. While similar to DART On-Call, GoLink allows booking through DART's GoPass app (over-the-phone booking is still available), and it does not require trips to be scheduled one hour in advance. GoLink trips are included in DART passes. By default, riders are provided trips by DART-owned minivans and minibuses; riders can also opt-in to riding Uber and Lyft vehicles at no extra cost.

GoLink gradually replaced DART On-Call and FLEX services, which were eventually discontinued in 2021. The service was further expanded in 2022 to complement the revised bus network, replacing many less-traveled routes that were not carried over from the previous network.

As of September 2025, GoLink trips can be scheduled in 23 (Note: DART officially operates 29 zones, but 10 of them are grouped into "pilot areas", which allow free travel among multiple neighboring zones. This number includes the 4 pilot areas and excludes their 10 constituent zones.) zones throughout DART's service area, each of which connect to designated rail and bus stations. Service is available daily from 5 AM to midnight. Travel between zones is not permitted, though some zones overlap.

== Paratransit ==
DART provides ADA-compliant paratransit for its member cities. Patrons with physical, cognitive, or visual disabilities can schedule curb-to-curb trips to nearby passenger facilities, such as park-and-rides or rail stations. If the disabilities are severe enough that the patron cannot use DART's rail or bus services at all, they are able to schedule trips to any location within the member cities.

DART previously operated two alternative services for elderly and disabled residents that did not qualify for ADA paratransit. DART Rides serviced residents of Addison, Carrollton, Dallas, Farmers Branch, Irving, Plano, and Rowlett, while Collin County Rides serviced residents of Allen, Fairview, and Wylie. Both services were operated by the microtransit company Spare. Collin County Rides was transferred to the Denton County Transportation Authority in 2023, and DART Rides was discontinued in 2025 in favor of standard GoLink service.

=== Collin County Transit ===
Collin County Transit provides curb-to-curb service to elderly, disabled, and low-income residents of Celina, Lowry Crossing, McKinney, Melissa, Princeton, and Prosper for a fixed fare. DART operates this service on behalf of the McKinney Urban Transit District (MUTD).

== Ridership and financial performance ==
Average daily ridership for DART has been in the vicinity of 200,000 riders per day over the last couple decades. In the 1st quarter of 1998, DART's weekday ridership averaged 211,000 riders per day system-wide. Ridership has risen and fallen since then; total ridership, including Trinity Railway Express ridership, has been as high as 248,500 average weekday riders in the 3rd quarter of 2008, and as low as 194,700 average weekday riders in the 1st quarter of 2010. However, after a year-long study in 2012 that counted passenger counts through both the existing manual method and a new automated counting system, DART concluded it has been underreporting rail ridership by more than 15 percent each year. In the 4th quarter of 2012, DART reported an average weekday ridership of 252,900. In the fourth quarter of 2014, DART reported total ridership had declined to 233,900 weekday riders.

Overall, DART is one of the lowest-performing transit systems in the U.S., when measured against comparable peer cities, for number of passenger trips, operating cost per mile, and fare recovery rate. In 2016, in addition to rider's fare payments, taxpayers paid $5.90 for each trip taken. In 2022, about 3% of DART's operating income came from passenger fares, compared to 61% from local sales taxes and 18% from COVID-19 relief grants.

In addition to fares and sales tax revenue, DART has raised funds by issuing bonds. Following a referendum in 2000, DART was given the authority to issue $2.9 billion in bonds over a 15-to-20 year period. In 2012, a court ruled that DART could exceed this limit so long as the debt is not solely backed by sales taxes. The most recent bond issue occurred in 2021, consisting of two series for a total of $1 billion.

== Member cities ==
In addition to the cities that voted to join DART at its creation, any city that adjoins a DART member city is eligible to join.

Member cities fund DART with a 1% sales tax earmarked to the Dallas Metropolitan Transit Authority (the legal name of the DART's tax district). Texas law limits municipal sales taxes to 2% total, which prevents many cities from joining without sacrificing local sales taxes.

DART is capable of establishing service to locations in non-member cities through special agreements. For example, DART serves Eastfield College, which is within the city limits of non-DART member Mesquite, as it is a part of the Dallas College system.

=== List of member cities ===
All current members of DART are charter members, having joined during the 1983 vote.

Municipality	DART facilities	GoLink zones	Notes
Addison	Addison	None	Addison planned a vote to withdraw from DART but cancelled the measure in January 1990. It held a withdrawal election in May 2026 but voted to remain a member.
Carrollton	Downtown Carrollton; North Carrollton/Frankford; Trinity Mills	Keller Springs; Northwest Carrollton	Carrollton voted to remain a DART member in January 1985 by a 69–31 percent margin, again voted in August 1989 to remain a member, and yet again voted to remain a member in August 1996 by a 77–23 percent margin.
Cockrell Hill	Cockrell Hill	None	Cockrell Hill is one of only two suburbs south of the Trinity River that is a DART member, the other being Glenn Heights.
Dallas	47 rail stations and 6 bus facilities, including: Akard; Buckner; Cityplace/Uptown; Cypress Waters; Fair Park; Inwood/Love Field; Knoll Trail; Medical/Market Center; MLK Jr.; Pearl/Arts District; Red Bird; SMU/Mockingbird; St. Paul; Union Station; UNT Dallas; Victory; West End; Westmoreland	Inland Port; Lake Highlands; Lakewood; Mountain Creek; North Dallas Pilot (Note: Cross-zone pilot consisting of the North Dallas, North Central Dallas, and Preston Hollow zones); Preston Hollow; Rylie/Kleburg Pilot (Note: Cross-zone pilot consisting of the Rylie and Kleburg zones); South Dallas; University Park; West Dallas	
Farmers Branch	Farmers Branch	Farmers Branch	Farmers Branch voted to remain a DART member in January 1985 by a 61–39 percent margin, and again voted in November 1989 to remain a member.
Garland	Downtown Garland; Forest/Jupiter; Lake Ray Hubbard; South Garland	Eastern Pilot (Note: Cross-zone pilot consisting of the Rowlett and Southeast Garland zones)	Garland voted to remain a DART member in November 1989 and again in January 1996 (the latter by a 2–1 margin).
Glenn Heights	Glenn Heights	Glenn Heights	Glenn Heights is one of only two suburbs south of the Trinity River that is a DART member, the other being Cockrell Hill. Because Glenn Heights does not border a DART member city, it would be ineligible for membership today had it not joined in 1983.
Irving	Belt Line; Dallas College North Lake Campus; Downtown Irving/Heritage Crossing; Hidden Ridge; Irving Convention Center; Las Colinas Urban Center; University of Dallas; West Irving	Central Irving; Cypress Waters; East Irving; Passport Park/Bear Creek; South Irving	Irving voted to remain a DART member in August 1989, and again voted to remain a member in August 1996 by a 57–43 percent margin. It planned another withdrawal election in 2026 but cancelled it.
Plano	12th Street; Downtown Plano; Jack Hatchell; Northwest Plano; Parker Road; Shiloh Road	East Plano; Plano Pilot (Note: Cross-zone pilot consisting of the Far North Plano, Legacy West, and North Central Plano/Chase Oaks zones); South Central Plano; Southwest Plano	Plano voted to remain a DART member in August 1989, and again voted to remain a member in August 1996 by a 77–23 percent margin. It planned another withdrawal election in 2026 but cancelled it.
Richardson	Arapaho Center; CityLine/Bush; Galatyn Park; Spring Valley; UT Dallas	East Telecom	
Rowlett	Downtown Rowlett	Eastern Pilot	Rowlett voted to remain a DART member in August 1989, and again voted to remain a member in August 1996 by a 67–33 percent margin.
University Park	bus and paratransit service only	University Park	University Park held a withdrawal election in May 2026 but voted to remain a member.

=== Former member cities ===
Under Texas law, cities are permitted to hold withdrawal elections once every six years. If a city votes to not continue DART membership, service to the city will cease immediately after the election is canvassed. However, the city's 1% sales tax will continue to be allocated to DART until its share of any outstanding DART-issued debt is paid off.

Municipality	Joined	Left	Reason for departure	Current transit provider(s)	Notes
Buckingham	1985	1996	Annexed by Richardson	N/A	To date, Buckingham is the only city to have joined DART since the initial 1983 election. A withdrawal vote scheduled for July 1989 was cancelled before it occurred.
Coppell	1983	1989	Withdrawal election	SPAN (paratransit)	DART's Cypress Waters station is in a Dallas exclave that borders Coppell. Coppell is eligible to re-join DART, as it borders three member cities (Carrollton, Dallas, and Irving).
Flower Mound	1983	1989	Withdrawal election	SPAN (paratransit)	Flower Mound is not eligible to re-join DART, as it does not border a current member city. It is eligible to join the Denton County Transportation Authority, but a 2003 measure to do so failed.
Highland Park	1983	2026	Withdrawal election	Highland Park On-Demand (microtransit) (Note: transfer to DART rail available at SMU/Mockingbird station)	Highland Park is eligible to re-join DART, as it borders two member cities (Dallas and University Park).

=== Declined membership ===
These cities have participated in at least one DART membership election and declined service. Unless otherwise noted, they are still eligible to join DART.

Municipality	Election year(s)	Current transit provider(s)	Notes
The Colony	1983		The Colony is also eligible to join DCTA, as it is in Denton County.
Duncanville	1983	STAR Transit (microtransit) (Note: transfer to DART available at UNT Dallas station, Red Bird Transit Center, and Glenn Heights Park & Ride)	
Grand Prairie	1983	Via Grand Prairie (microtransit) (Note: transfer to the TRE available at West Irving station)	
Hutchins	1992	STAR Transit (microtransit) (Note: transfer to DART available at Camp Wisdom and UNT Dallas station)	The 1992 ballot measure to join DART was rejected by 50 votes.
Lancaster	1983	STAR Transit (microtransit)	
Mesquite	1983	STAR Transit (microtransit) (Note: transfer to DART available at Lawnview station and Lake Ray Hubbard Transit Center)	
Murphy	2002		
Wilmer	1983	STAR Transit (microtransit)	Wilmer is no longer eligible to join DART, as it does not border a DART member city.
unincorporated Dallas County	1983		

=== Other cities eligible for membership ===
These cities are eligible to join DART because they are adjacent to at least one DART member city.

Municipality	Bordering DART Member(s)	Current transit provider(s)	Notes
Allen	Plano	Collin County Rides (paratransit)	A commuter rail route between Plano and McKinney, which would stop in Allen, has been proposed.
Arlington	Irving	Arlington On-Demand (microtransit) (Note: transfer to the TRE available at CentrePort/DFW Airport station)	From 2013 to 2017, DART and Trinity Metro jointly operated the Metro Arlington Xpress (MAX) bus route.
Balch Springs	Dallas	STAR Transit (bus, microtransit) (Note: transfer to DART available at Buckner station)	
Cedar Hill	Dallas; Glenn Heights	STAR Transit (microtransit) (Note: transfer to DART available at UNT Dallas station, Red Bird Transit Center, and Glenn Heights Park & Ride)	
DeSoto	Dallas; Glenn Heights	STAR Transit (microtransit)	
Euless	Irving	NETS (paratransit)	
Fort Worth	Irving	Trinity Metro (bus, rail, paratransit, microtransit)	DART and Trinity Metro jointly operate the Trinity Railway Express rail service in Fort Worth.
Frisco	Plano	Frisco Demand-Response (paratransit)	A commuter rail route between Irving and Frisco has been proposed.
Grapevine	Dallas	TEXRail (rail) (Note: transfer to DART available at DFW Airport North station); Grapevine Convention and Visitors Bureau (bus); NETS (paratransit)	DART's Silver Line stops at two stations in Grapevine city limits (DFW Airport North and DFW Airport Terminal B), both of which were originally built for TEXRail.
Heath	Dallas; Rowlett	STAR Transit (paratransit)	
Lewisville	Carrollton	DCTA (rail, microtransit) (Note: transfer to DART available at Trinity Mills station)	
McKinney	Plano	Collin County Transit (paratransit)	A commuter rail route between Plano and McKinney has been proposed.
Oak Leaf	Glenn Heights	CTS (paratransit)	
Ovilla	Glenn Heights	CTS (paratransit) (Note: Only available in the portion of Ovilla in Ellis County)	
Parker	Plano		
Red Oak	Glenn Heights	CTS (paratransit)	
Rockwall	Dallas; Rowlett	STAR Transit (paratransit)	
Sachse	Garland; Richardson; Rowlett		
Seagoville	Dallas	STAR Transit (microtransit)	
Sunnyvale	Dallas; Garland		

== Executive directors ==
- Maurice Carter 1982–1984
- George Bonna (Interim) 1984–1985
- Ted Tedasco 1985–1986
- John Hoeft (Interim) 1986
- Charles Anderson 1986–1992
- Tony Venturato (Interim) 1992
- Jack Evans 1992
- Victor Burke (Interim) 1993
- Roger Snoble 1993–2001
- Gary Thomas 2001–2021
- David Leininger (Interim) 2021
- Nadine Lee 2021–2026
- David Leininger (Interim) 2026
- Nat Ford Jr. 2026 - present

== See also ==
- List of DART bus routes
- List of DART rail stations
- M-Line Trolley
- Light rail in the United States
- List of United States light rail systems by ridership
- List of tram and light rail transit systems
- Dublin Area Rapid Transit
