= Red Bird Transit Center =

Bus station in southern Dallas, Texas

Coordinates: 32.6803°N 96.8557°W

General information
- Location: 4831 S. Hampton Rd. Dallas, Texas 75232
- Owner: Dallas Area Rapid Transit
- Connections: DART: 101; STARNow Cedar Hill (M-F); STARNow DeSoto (M-F); STARNow Duncanville (M-F)

Construction
- Parking: 588 spaces
- Cycle facilities: 1 bike locker, 1 bike rack
- Accessible: Yes

Other information
- Website: Red Bird Transit Center

History
- Opened: November 13, 1989
Location

Red Bird Transit Center (originally Red Bird Park & Ride) is a public bus station in southern Dallas, Texas. Located at the intersection of US 67 and S. Hampton Road, it is owned and operated by Dallas Area Rapid Transit (DART) and primarily serves as a park and ride.

As of February 2026, the facility is served by one bus route, which connects the transit center to DART's Hampton and SWMD/Parkland rail stations. The station is a transfer point for STARNow, a microtransit service for the nearby cities of Cedar Hill, DeSoto, and Duncanville.

== History ==
The station was originally opened in 1985 by DART's predecessor, DTS, as a park and ride lot. Following overcrowding and claims that riders were using nearby private lots, DART allocated $3 million to expand the lot and build an indoor waiting area.

A groundbreaking for the expanded station was held on February 16, 1989. Bus operations began at the lot later that year in November, though the indoor waiting area did not open until May of the following year. The station was the fourth indoor facility to be built by DART (behind the South Irving, North Carrolton, and West Plano transit centers), as well as the first to be built within Dallas proper.

For most of its life, the station was served by an express route, which provided nonstop service to Downtown Dallas (specifically Akard station) during weekday peak times. The route was discontinued in February 2026 as part of a systemwide service reduction.
