= Glenn Heights Park & Ride =

Park and ride lot in Glenn Heights, Texas

Coordinates: 32.5597°N 96.8275°W

General information
- Location: 1200 E. Bear Creek Rd. Glenn Heights, Texas 75154
- Owner: Dallas Area Rapid Transit
- Connections: DART Route 306 (M-F); Glenn Heights GoLink Zone (M-Sun); STARNow Cedar Hill (M-F); STARNow DeSoto (M-F); STARNow Duncanville (M-F)

Construction
- Parking: 595 spaces
- Accessible: Yes

Other information
- Website: Glenn Heights Park & Ride

History
- Opened: September 16, 1991
Location

Glenn Heights Park & Ride is a small park and ride lot in Glenn Heights, Texas. Located west of I-35E, it is the southernmost transit facility in the Dallas Area Rapid Transit (DART) system.

The lot is primarily served by the Glenn Heights Express bus, which provides weekday peak-only service to Downtown Dallas, Dallas Market Center, and the Southwestern Medical District.

The station is also a transfer point for two microtransit services. Glenn Heights GoLink, operated by DART, services the city of Glenn Heights and UNT Dallas station, while STARNow, operated by STAR Transit, services the nearby cities of Cedar Hill, DeSoto, and Duncanville.

The lot contains 595 parking spaces and 4 open-air passenger shelters. The lot does not have an air-conditioned shelter or a station attendant.

== History ==
The station opened on September 16, 1991 as a replacement for a temporary park and ride closer to I-35E.

In 2011, in an effort to improve parking availability, DART announced that Glenn Heights Park & Ride would be added to an upcoming paid-parking program. The program, later dubbed "Fair Share Parking", would charge a daily parking fee to riders that did not live in a DART member city; it was also set to be used at Parker Road and North Carrollton/Frankford. However, when the program was rolled out on April 2, 2012, it was only implemented at the rail stations, not at Glenn Heights. Fair Share Parking ended two years later, and while it was expanded to two more stations in the interim, Glenn Heights was not one of them.

In 2023, DART installed two EV charging stations in the lot.
