= Downtown Garland station =

DART rail station in Garland, Texas

Downtown Garland
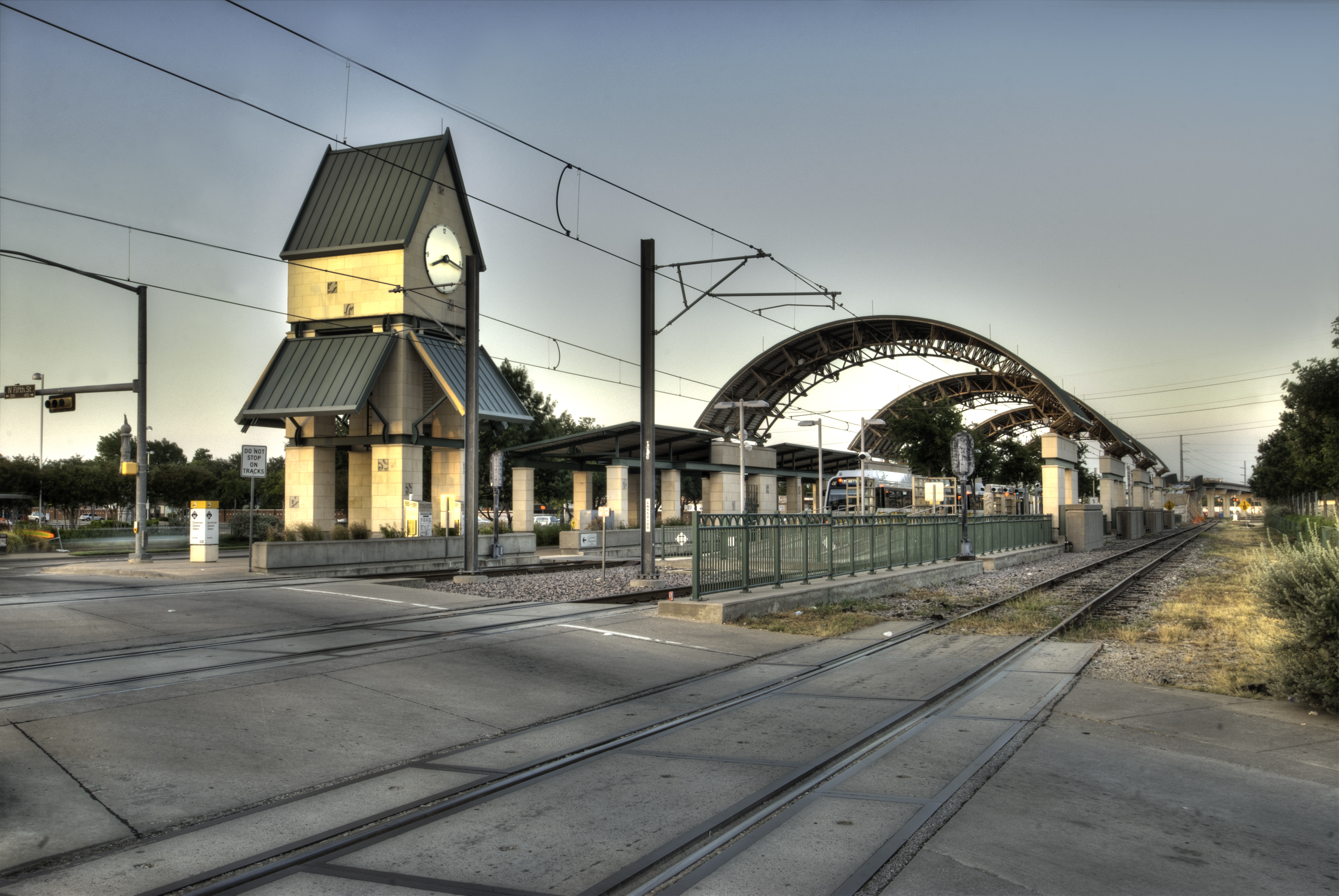

General information
- Location: 430 W. Walnut Street; Garland, Texas
- Coordinates: 32°54′58.68″N 96°38′7.12″W
- System: DART rail
- Owner: Dallas Area Rapid Transit
- Platforms: Island platform
- Connections: DART: 22, 200, 202, 203, 224, 238, 250, and 251

Construction
- Structure type: At-grade
- Parking: 540 spaces
- Cycle facilities: 6 lockers, 3 racks
- Accessible: Yes

History
- Opened: November 3, 1975 (bus); November 18, 2002 (rail)

Services
Preceding station	DART	Following station
Forest/Jupiter toward UNT Dallas	Blue Line	Downtown Rowlett Terminus
Location

Downtown Garland station (previously North Garland Transit Center and Garland Central Transit Center) is a DART rail station located in Garland, Texas. The station is located at the intersection of Fifth Street and Walnut Street in Garland's historic downtown district, two blocks north of the town square.

The station serves the Blue Line. The station is also a major bus transfer facility for the city, with bus routes connecting to the South Garland and Lake Ray Hubbard transit centers.

== History ==
=== North Garland Transit Center/Garland Central Transit Center ===
In 1975, the city of Garland announced plans for an express bus service between Garland and Downtown Dallas, which would be operated by the Dallas Transit System. As part of the service, the city built a 312-space park-and-ride lot in downtown Garland at the corner of Fifth and Walnut, which opened on November 3, 1975.

The Dallas Transit System was superseded by Dallas Area Rapid Transit (DART) in 1985, which named the lot the North Garland Transit Center. In 1988, DART offered the city $355,609 to purchase the transit center.

In 1993, DART built a new station building, expanded the parking lot to 530 spaces, and renamed the facility to Garland Central Transit Center.

=== Downtown Garland ===
In 1999, DART started construction on a northern extension of the Blue Line, which at the time ended at Mockingbird station. Garland Central Transit Center, which was located near the Missouri–Kansas–Texas right-of-way used for the project, would be the northernmost station on the extension and would open in 2002.

Construction on Garland Central's rail platforms began in 2000. In anticipation of the extension, the city of Garland renovated two performing arts venues in its downtown area.

On November 18, 2002, the Blue Line extension to Garland Central Transit Center was completed, and the station was renamed to Downtown Garland. The station made Garland the second suburb with DART rail service (after Richardson) and the first to have a station in its downtown area. The station served as the northern terminus of the Blue Line until 2012, when the line was extended to Downtown Rowlett.

In 2005, Garland mayor Bob Day proposed moving the station one block west to Sixth Street. The proposal would bring the station closer to downtown retailers, and it would also allow for the creation of a bridge over a Kansas City Southern corridor, which was necessary to expand the line to Rowlett. DART eventually determined a bridge design that would not require moving the station.

==== Proposed Amtrak connection ====
In 2001, Amtrak announced plans for the Crescent Star, a daily passenger train between Fort Worth and New York City. The route would pass through Garland using the MKT corridor used by the Blue Line. The city of Garland proposed an Amtrak station at the corner of First and Walnut, approximately 1/3 mile (0.54 km) east of the DART station, to allow for transfer between the two services.

The Crescent Star was originally planned to start service in 2001, but it was delayed due to funding issues. The proposal would remain dormant until 2023, when Amtrak applied for a newer grant. It is unclear if the Amtrak station in Garland is still being considered.
