= Jack Hatchell Transit Center =

Bus station in Plano, Texas

Coordinates: 33.017232°N 96.76881°W

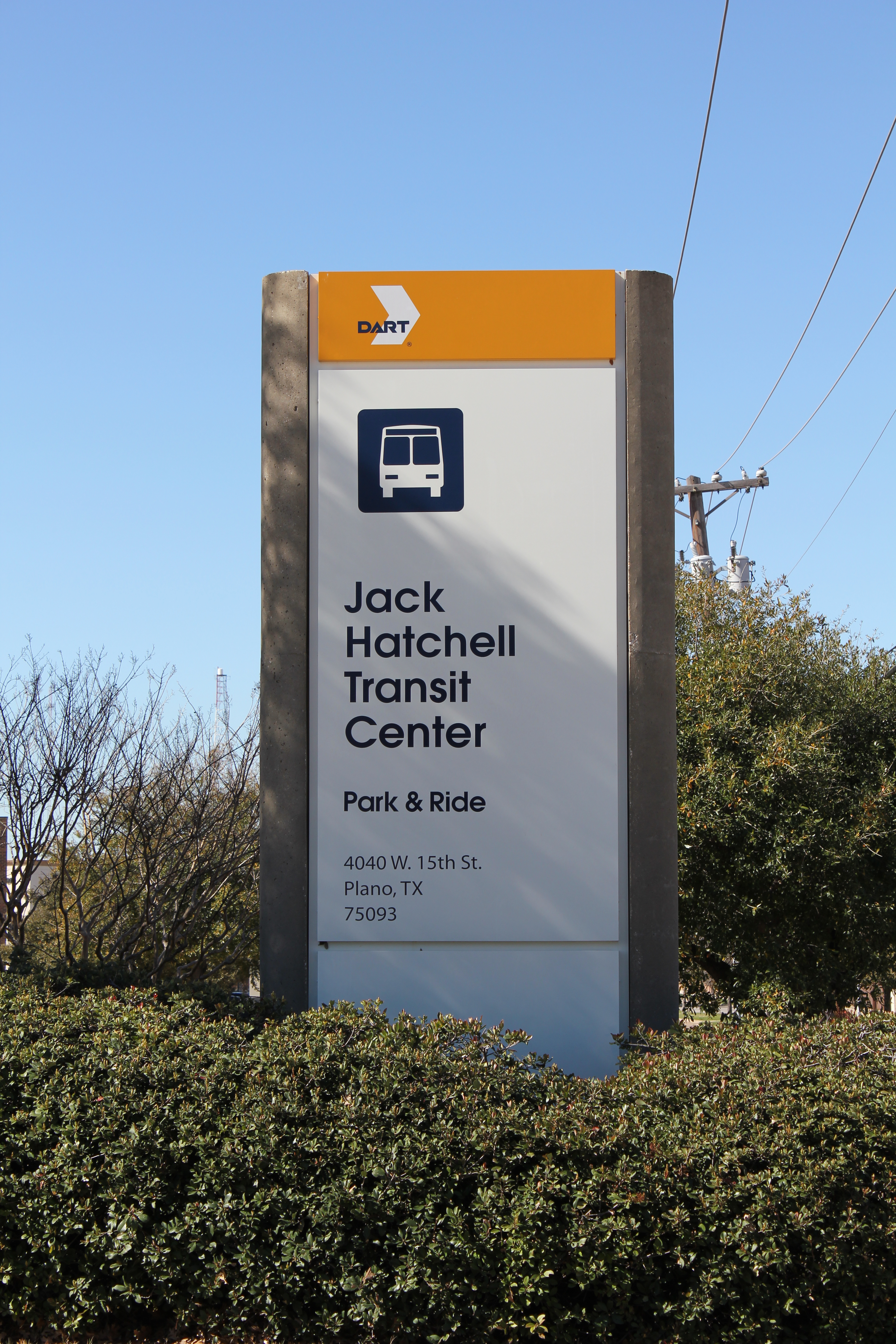

General information
- Location: 4040 West 15th St. Plano, Texas 75093
- Owner: Dallas Area Rapid Transit
- Connections: DART Routes 236 and 241

Construction
- Parking: 815 spaces
- Cycle facilities: 3 bike lockers, 3 bike racks
- Accessible: Yes

History
- Opened: January 30, 1989
Location

Jack Hatchell Transit Center is a bus-only mass transit station located at the intersection of W 15th Street and Coit Road in Plano, Texas, United States. It is owned and operated by Dallas Area Rapid Transit (DART). The facility is one of only seven DART facilities to not be located in Dallas County.

The station and its connecting routes service two Plano-area hospitals (Medical City Plano and Baylor Medical Center Plano) and four DART facilities (Addison, Downtown Plano, Forest Lane, and Northwest Plano).

== History ==
In 1987, DART operated only one facility in Plano, which was a park-and-ride lot in east Plano. To improve service on the western side of Plano and prevent overcrowding, DART opted to build a new station. The station was opened on January 30, 1989 as West Plano Transit Center, though the facility's indoor waiting area was not completed until later that year. The indoor waiting facility at the station was the third to be built by DART after South Irving Transit Center and North Carrolton Transit Center.

Ridership at the east Plano facility was not substantially affected by West Plano Transit Center's opening. In response, DART opted to build an expanded east Plano facility, which opened in 1992 as East Plano Transit Center.

On September 25, 1993, a shuttle route established between West Plano Transit Center and Texas Stadium for a Garth Brooks concert suffered higher-than expected demand, leaving many fans stranded at the station. The incident led to DART reviewing their event shuttle policies.

On October 12, 2009, the station was renamed and formally dedicated in memory of Jack Hatchell, a Plano councilman and Collin County commissioner who had died the previous year. Hatchell was instrumental in Plano joining DART.
