= Lake Ray Hubbard Transit Center =

Bus station in Garland, Texas

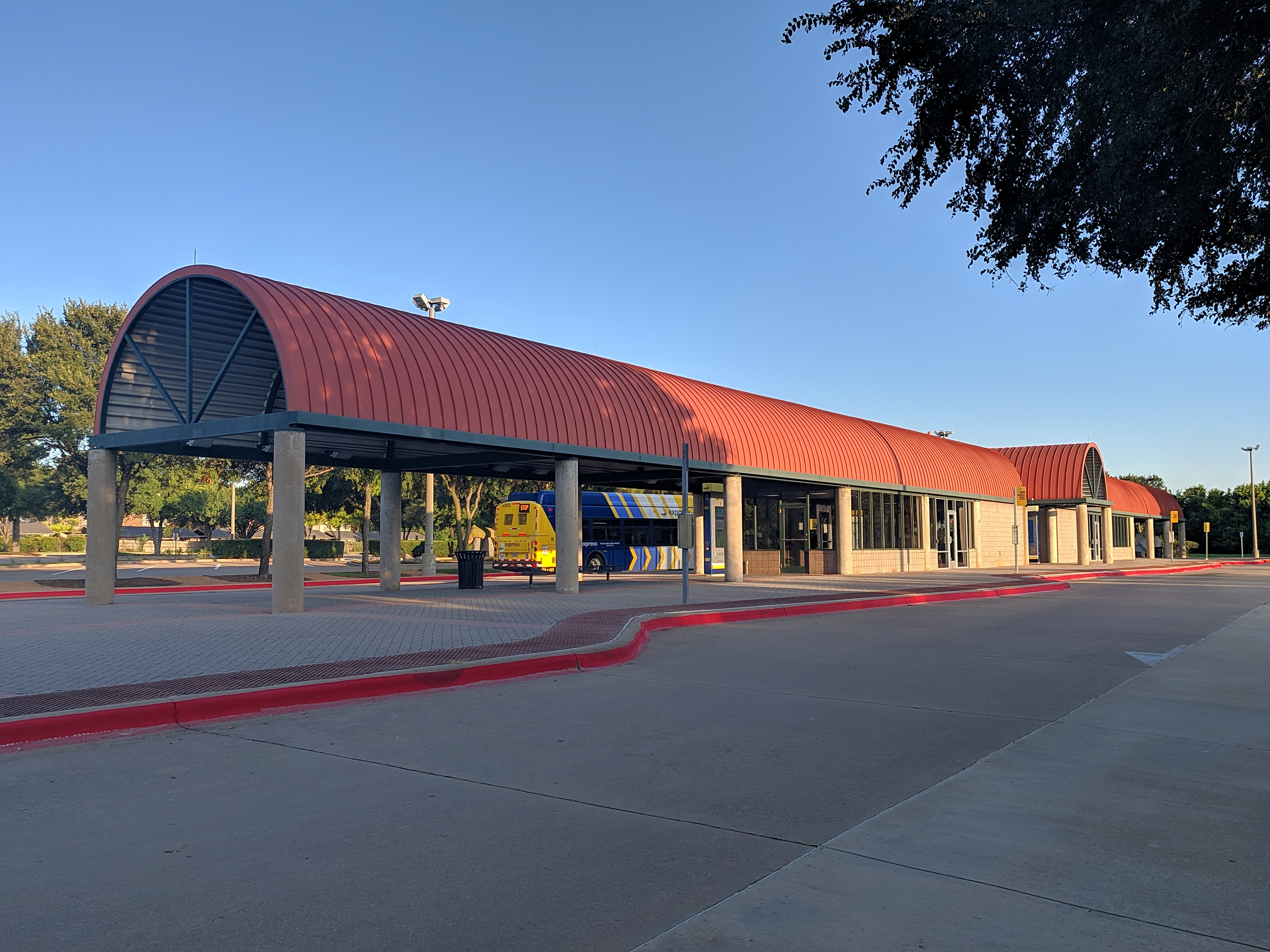

General information
- Location: 6151 Duck Creek Dr. Garland, Texas 75043
- Coordinates: 32°50′34.60″N 96°36′5.16″W
- Owner: Dallas Area Rapid Transit
- Connections: DART Routes 212, 224; Southeast Garland GoLink Zone (M-Sun), Rowlett GoLink Zone (M-Sun); STARNow Mesquite (M-Sat)

Construction
- Parking: 657 spaces
- Cycle facilities: 2 Bike Lockers, 1 Bike Rack
- Accessible: Yes

History
- Opened: December 1994
Location

Lake Ray Hubbard Transit Center is a mass transit station in southeastern Garland, Texas. The station is part of the Dallas Area Rapid Transit system and is located near the intersection of Broadway Boulevard and Interstate 30.

Bus routes at the station service other portions of Garland (notably Downtown Garland station and South Garland Transit Center), as well as Downtown Dallas. The station is also a hub for two on-demand services. Eastern Pilot GoLink, operated by DART, services Garland neighborhoods east of the station and the city of Rowlett, while STARNow Mesquite, operated by STAR Transit, serves the city of Mesquite.

== History ==
Southeastern Garland was originally serviced by a park-and-ride lot at Audubon Park.

Ground was broken on the current station in May 1993. The station was completed in December 1994, though the parking lot was opened earlier in the year.

In 1996, plans were made to build bus-only ramps connecting the station to proposed HOV lanes on Interstate 30. Ultimately, these ramps were not built, as the completed lanes stopped at Northwest Drive, about a mile west of the station. Nevertheless, DART began running an express bus on I-30.

In 2023, a groundbreaking was held for a transit-oriented development project adjacent to the station.

In 2026, the express route to Downtown Dallas was discontinued as part of a systemwide service reduction. Service to Downtown Dallas remained available through a non-express route.
