= DFW Airport station =

DFW Airport station may refer to:

- CentrePort/DFW Airport station, the Trinity Railway Express station south of the airport
- DFW Airport Terminal A station, the DART Orange Line station at the airport's Terminal A
- DFW Airport Terminal B station, the TEXRail station at the airport's Terminal B
- DFW Airport North station, the TEXRail station north of the airport

== See also ==
- Dallas Fort Worth International Airport (IATA code: DFW), an international airport in North Texas
