= Downtown Carrollton station =

Public transit station in Carrollton, Texas

Downtown Carrollton
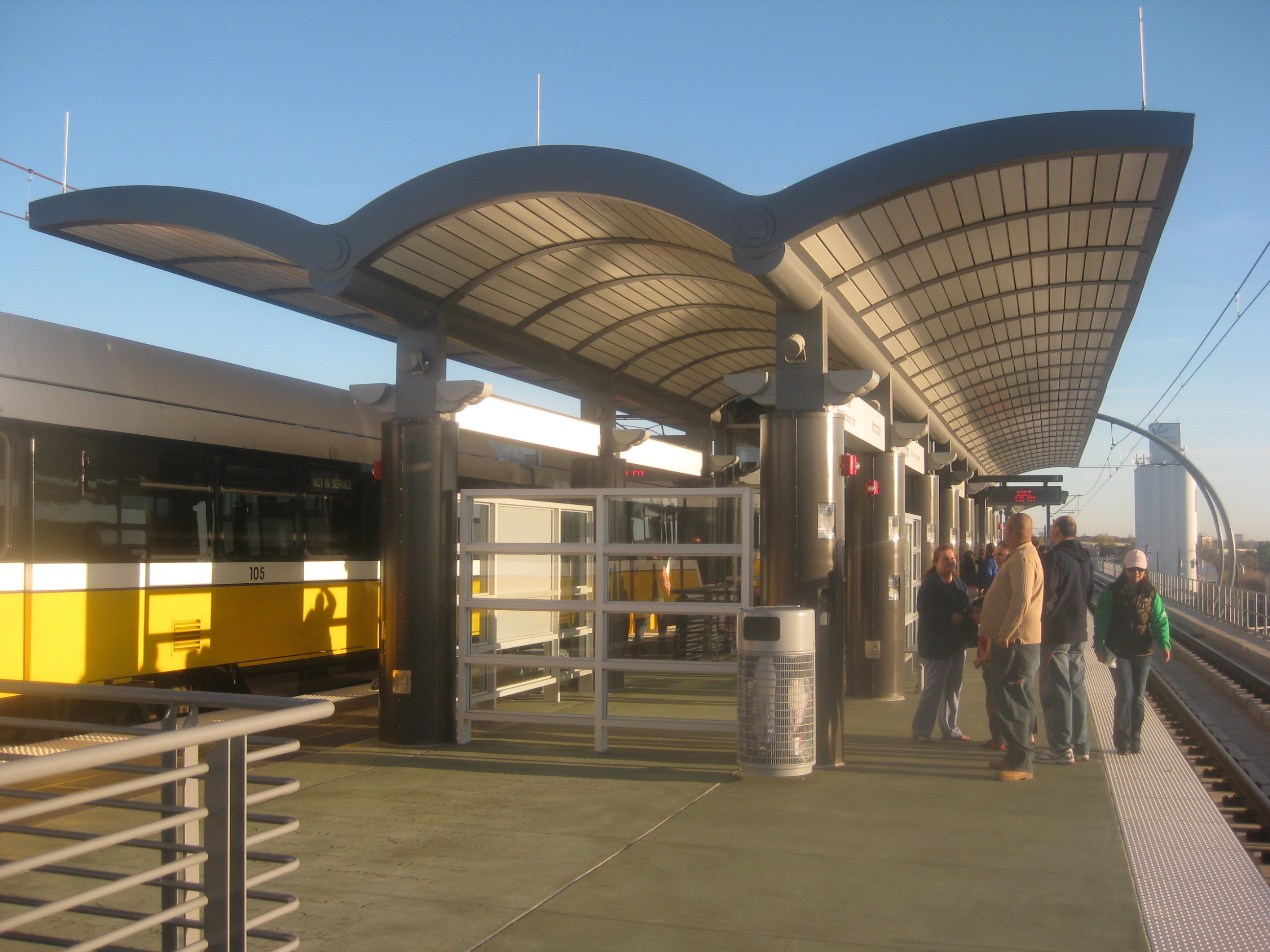
- Elevated Green Line platform (December 2010)

General information
- Location: 1013 North Denton Drive; Carrollton, Texas
- Coordinates: 32°57′16″N 96°54′30″W
- System: DART rail
- Owner: Dallas Area Rapid Transit
- Platforms: Green: 1 island platform Silver: 2 side platforms
- Tracks: Green: 2 Silver: 2
- Connections: DART: 229, Farmers Branch GoLink Zone (M-Sun), Keller Springs GoLink Zone (M-Sun)

Construction
- Structure type: Green: Elevated; Silver: At-grade
- Parking: 251 spaces
- Cycle facilities: 2 lockers, 1 rack
- Accessible: Yes

History
- Opened: December 6, 2010
- Rebuilt: 2025 (Note: Addition of at-grade platforms and track for Silver Line opened on October 25, 2025.)

Services
Preceding station	DART	Following station
Trinity Mills toward North Carrollton/Frankford	Green Line	Farmers Branch toward Buckner
Cypress Waters toward DFW Airport Terminal B	Silver Line	Addison toward Shiloh Road
Proposed services
Preceding station	DCTA	Following station
Trinity Mills toward Downtown Denton Transit Center	A-train	Terminus
Former services
Preceding station	Missouri–Kansas–Texas Railroad	Following station
Trinity Mills toward Denton	Dallas and Denton	Farmers Branch toward Dallas
Location

Downtown Carrollton station is a public transit station in Carrollton, Texas. Located in Carrollton's historic downtown near the intersection of Interstate 35E and Belt Line Road and operated by Dallas Area Rapid Transit (DART), the station serves the Green Line and Silver Line of DART's rail system, a bus route, and two microtransit service zones.

An extension of the A-train (which currently connects Denton County to Trinity Mills station in northern Carrollton) to Downtown Carrollton station has been proposed.

== History ==
=== Predecessor ===
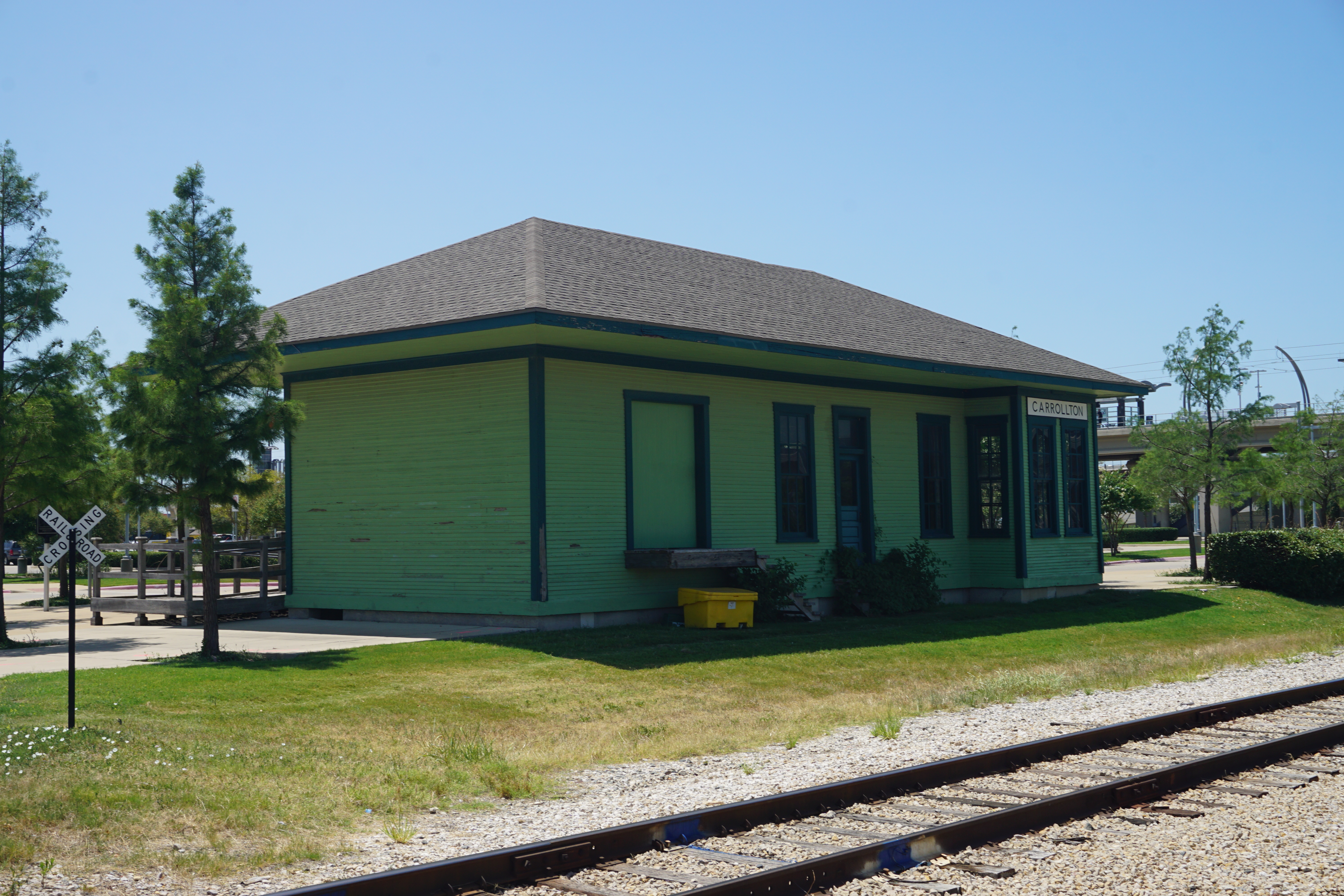
Historic MKT depot (2019)

The area containing Downtown Carrollton station was originally served by three rail lines: the northwest/southeast Missouri–Kansas–Texas Railroad (abbreviated MKT), constructed in 1878; the east/west St. Louis Southwestern Railway (nicknamed the "Cotton Belt"), constructed in 1888; and the northeast/southwest St. Louis–San Francisco Railway (nicknamed the "Frisco"), constructed in 1908.

A depot building for the MKT railroad, constructed in 1924 after the previous depot was destroyed in a fire, still stands, though it was moved 300 feet (91 m) from its original location in 2008 to allow for construction of the Green Line. The building was deemed a historic site in 2010 and is set to be redeveloped.

=== Green Line ===
In 2007, DART officials broke ground on the Green Line, a light rail line which utilized the MKT rail corridor. For the downtown Carrollton area, DART constructed an elevated corridor and station.

In late October 2010, the city of Carrollton held the first annual Festival at the Switchyard at the station, which featured a preview service between Downtown Carrollton and Trinity Mills station. The station entered revenue service on December 6, 2010.

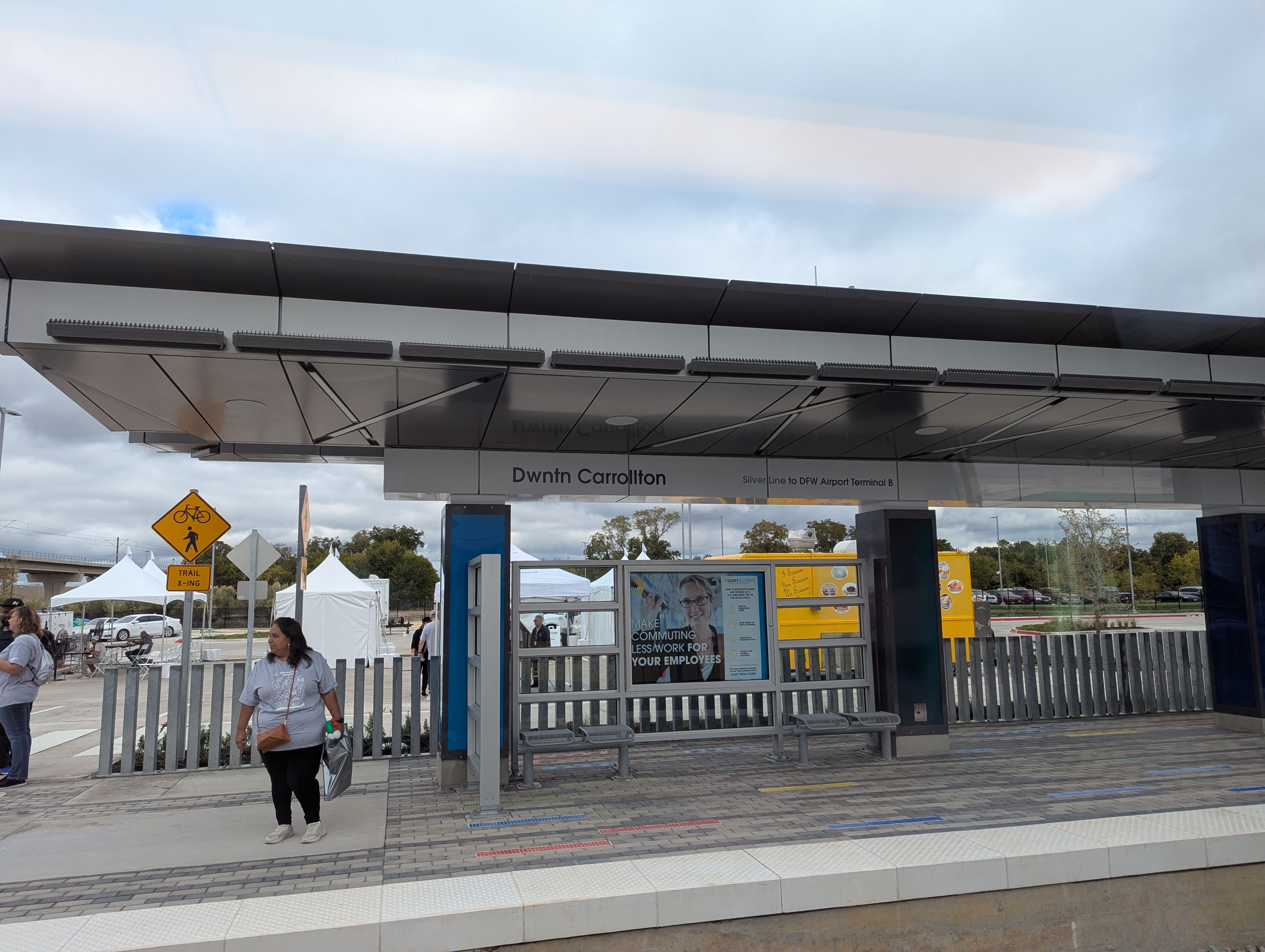
Westbound Silver Line platform (2025)

=== Silver Line ===
In 2019, DART began construction of the Silver Line, a commuter rail service which utilized the Cotton Belt rail corridor. DART constructed new at-grade platforms on the north side of the Downtown Carrollton parking lot for the Silver Line. Service began on October 25, 2025.

== Proposed services ==
The Denton County Transportation Authority, which operates the A-train commuter rail service, has proposed an extension of the A-train to Downtown Carrolton to allow for direct transfers to the Silver Line (and, by extension, Dallas Fort Worth International Airport).

A commuter rail service between Irving and Frisco, which would stop at Downtown Carrollton, has been proposed on the former Frisco rail corridor (currently owned by BNSF Railway).
