= Cypress Waters station =

Commuter rail station in Dallas, Texas

Cypress Waters
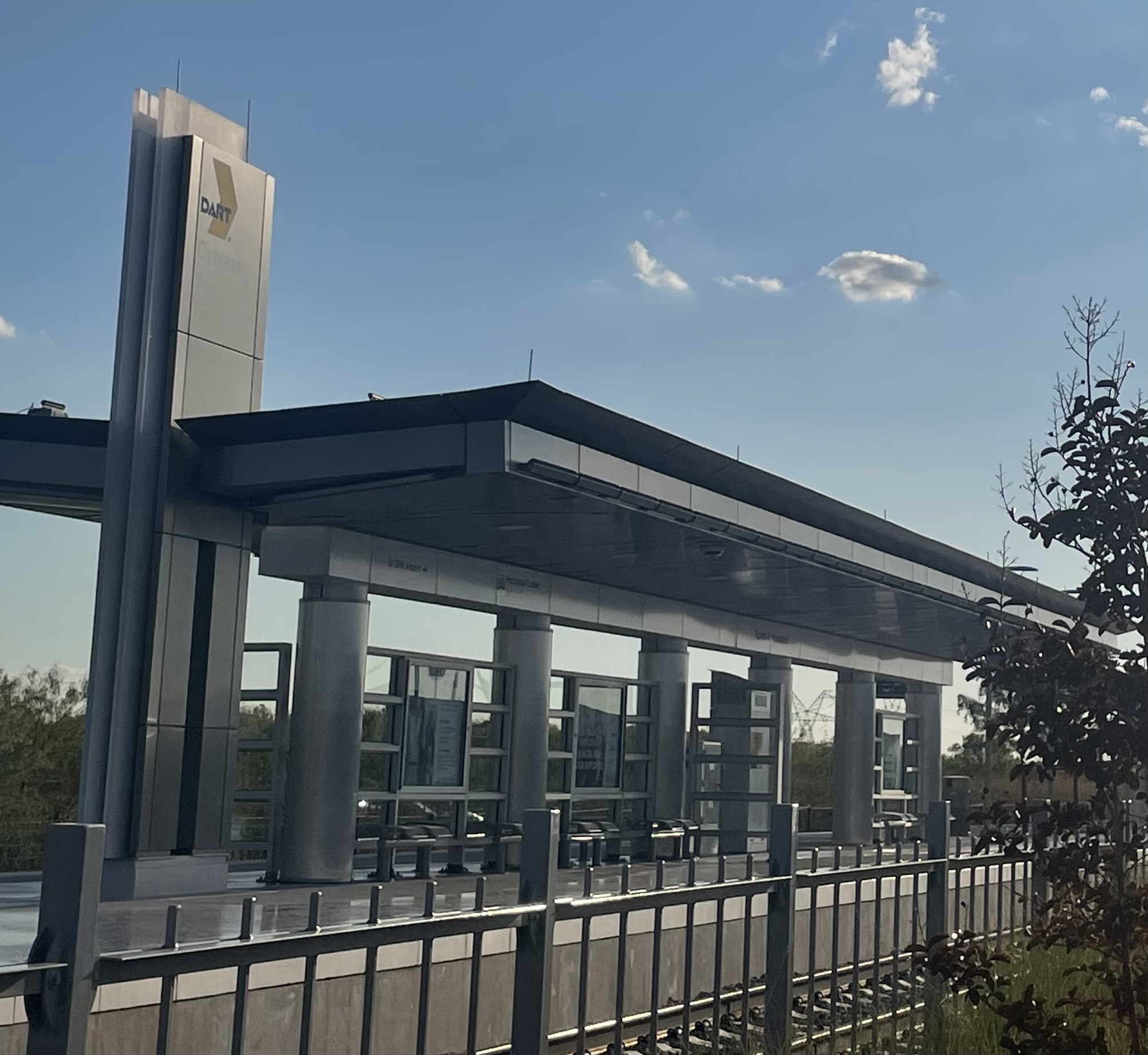

General information
- Location: 445 East Belt Line Road; Dallas, Texas
- Coordinates: 32.951338°N 96.983710°W
- System: DART rail
- Owner: Dallas Area Rapid Transit
- Platforms: 1 island platform
- Tracks: 2
- Connections: DART: Cypress Waters GoLink Zone (M-Sun)

Construction
- Structure type: At-grade
- Parking: 190 spaces
- Accessible: Yes

History
- Opened: October 25, 2025; 9 months ago

Services
Preceding station	DART	Following station
DFW Airport North toward DFW Airport Terminal B	Silver Line	Downtown Carrollton toward Shiloh Road
Location

Cypress Waters station is a DART Silver Line commuter rail station located in Cypress Waters, an exclave of Dallas, Texas surrounding North Lake. Located along Belt Line Road near the northwest corner of the exclave, the station serves a mixed-use development surrounding the lake, and it also features a park-and-ride lot for commuters from neighboring Coppell.

The station is decorated with a "water and wind" theme by local artist Chris Judy.

== History ==
The Silver Line was constructed atop an existing freight rail corridor originally built by the St. Louis Southwestern Railway. The corridor originally stayed north of Belt Line Road and passed through Coppell. Since Coppell was not a DART member and thus would not be able to house a station, the corridor was re-routed approximately 1/3 mile (0.54 km) south to Cypress Waters, an area within the city limits of DART member Dallas.

In 2022, shortly after construction of the corridor began, developer Billingsley Co. announced plans for a hotel and 2 million square feet (190,000 m^{2}) of office space in a 151-acre (61 ha) area surrounding the station. This served as an extension of an existing 1,000-acre (400 ha) development on the southwestern side of North Lake.

The station opened with the Silver Line on October 25, 2025.
