= List of current and former railroad companies operating in Dallas =

The following is a list of railroad companies that serve(d) Dallas. The first year is the year service began; the last is the year service was halted.

- 1872–1934 Houston and Texas Central Railroad (absorbed into the TNO)
- 1873–1976 Texas and Pacific Railway
- 1878–1880 Dallas and Wichita Railroad
- 1878 Dallas, Cleburne and Rio Grande Railroad
- 1878–1879 Chicago, Texas and Mexican Central Railway (purchased right of way from the DC&RG)
- 1879–1965 Gulf, Colorado and Santa Fe Railroad (acquired CT&MC)
- 1880–1989 Missouri-Kansas-Texas
- 1880–1881 Texas Trunk Railroad
- 1881–1961 Texas and New Orleans Railroad (acquired the TT)
- 1901–1904 Red River, Texas and Southern Railroad
- 1902–1964 Saint Louis, San Francisco and Texas Railroad (nickname Frisco, absorbed the RRT&S)
- 1903–1932 St. Louis Southwestern Railway
- 1903–1980 Chicago, Rock Island and Pacific Railroad
- 1925–1982 Fort Worth and Denver Railway
- 1932–1996 Southern Pacific (acquired the SLSW in 1932 and the T&NO in 1961)
- 1964–1980 St. Louis-San Francisco Railway (parent company merged with subsidiary)
- 1965–1996 Atchison, Topeka and Santa Fe (acquired the GC&SF)
- 1980–1996 Burlington Northern (acquired the SLSF and the bankrupt CRI&P lines in the Dallas area, merged the FW&D in 1982)
- 1989–present Union Pacific (acquired the MKT in 1989, Southern Pacific in 1996)
- 1994–present Kansas City Southern Railroad (purchased right of way from AT&SF)
- 1996–present BNSF Railway (merger between BN and AT&SF)
- Trinity and Brazos Valley

== See also ==
- Former transit companies in Dallas, Texas
- List of defunct Texas railroads
