= Northwest Plano Park & Ride =

Transit center in Plano, Texas, US

General information
- Location: 6830 Communications Parkway; Plano, Texas 75024
- Coordinates: 33.0705°N 96.8282°W
- Owner: Dallas Area Rapid Transit
- Connections: DART: 234, 239, 241, 308 (M-F); Far North Plano GoLink Zone (M-Sun), Legacy West GoLink Zone (M-Sun), North Central Plano/Chase Oaks GoLink Zone (M-Sun); GoZone Frisco

Construction
- Parking: 564 spaces
- Cycle facilities: 5 bike lockers, 2 bike racks
- Accessible: Yes

History
- Opened: July 30, 2012
Location

Northwest Plano Park & Ride is a bus-only park and ride station in Plano, Texas. The station is located on the western side of Dallas North Tollway in Plano's Legacy Park neighborhood. The station is operated by Dallas Area Rapid Transit and is the northernmost facility in the DART system. Unlike most DART transit centers, the lot does not have an air-conditioned waiting area.

The lot is served by three bus routes, which service Legacy Park shopping centers and provide direct connections to other DART transit centers. During weekday peak hours, an express route connects the station to Downtown Dallas directly; outside of this timeframe, downtown service is available with an intermediate stop at Addison Transit Center. The station is also a transfer point for two microtransit services: Plano Pilot GoLink, which services northern Plano, and GoZone Frisco, which services the non-DART member of Frisco.

== History ==
A bus station in northwestern Plano, tentatively titled the Westside Park & Ride, was first proposed in 2000. The proposal included three potential sites, all on the western side of Dallas North Tollway between Tennyson Parkway and Spring Creek Parkway. Local residents proposed an alternative site near the intersection of Dallas North Tollway and the President George Bush Turnpike, but this was not taken up. The second site, located between the first and third, was ultimately chosen, but the project was placed on hold due to the economic recession caused by the dot-com crash.

Construction of the site did not move forward until 2010, when it was included in DART's annual budget. Funding was provided by the North Central Texas Council of Governments. The station opened two years later on July 30, 2012. Construction of the station cost $12.5 million.

At opening, the station participated in DART's Fair Share Parking program, which charged a daily parking fee to residents of non-DART member cities, such as the nearby city of Frisco. The program was retired on April 2, 2014.

On March 26, 2018, DART introduced Legacy West GoLink, a microtransit service based at Northwest Plano Park & Ride that services the surrounding area. In 2022, the Legacy West zone was added to the Plano Pilot program, which allows travel between it, the Far North Plano zone, and the North Central Plano/Chase Oaks zone. However, direct GoLink service between Northwest Plano Park & Ride and Parker Road station (which is a hub for Far North Plano and North Central Plano/Chase Oaks) is not permitted since it is available by bus.

On May 5, 2026, the Denton County Transportation Authority introduced GoZone Frisco, a pilot microtransit service in Frisco, which connects to Northwest Plano Park & Ride.
