= South Garland Transit Center =

Bus station in Garland, Texas

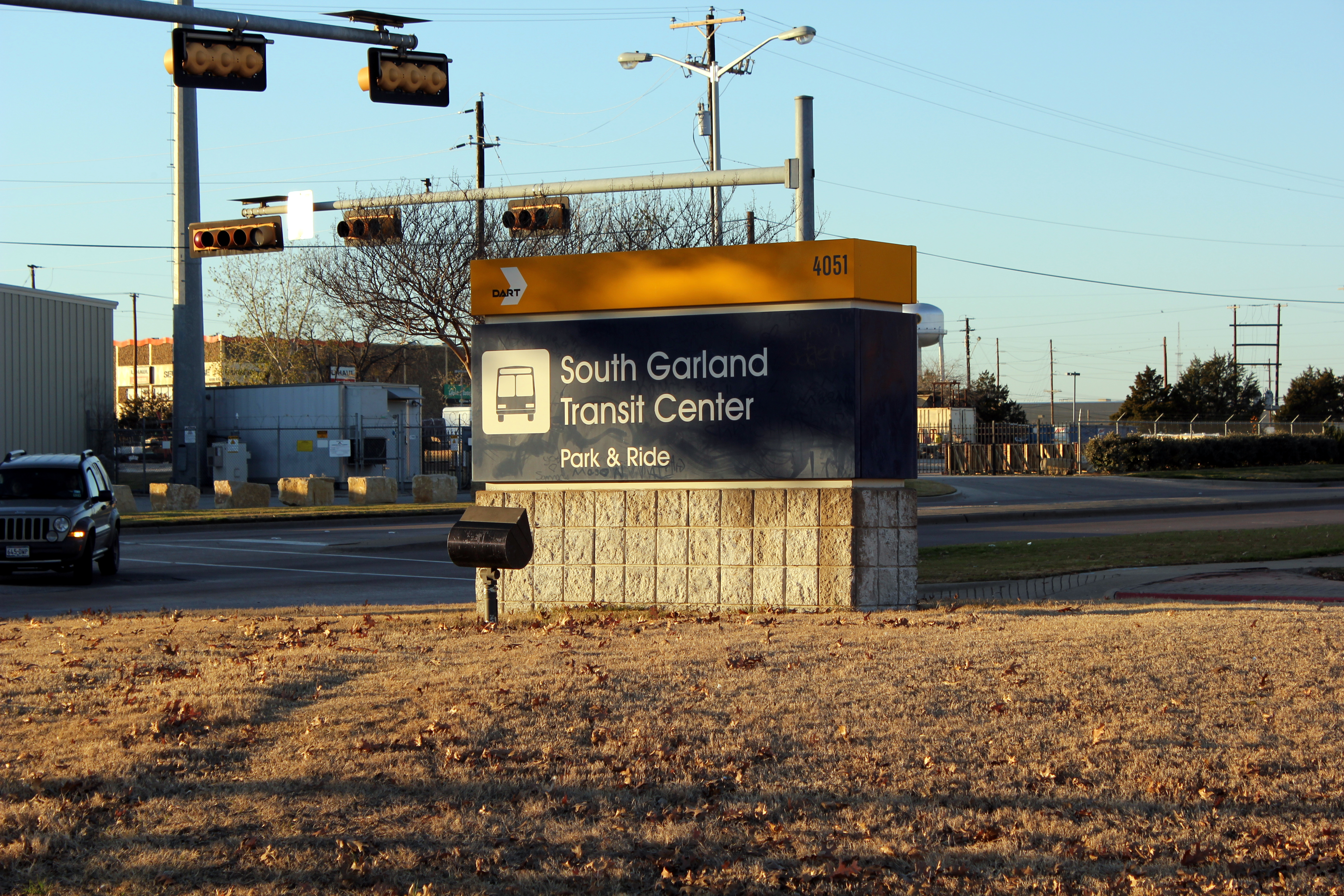

General information
- Location: 4051 Leon Rd. Garland, Texas 75041
- Coordinates: 32°52′4.99″N 96°39′47.27″W
- Owner: Dallas Area Rapid Transit
- Connections: DART Routes 15, 16, 18, 20, 203, 204, 212, 214, 242, 245, 247, and 251

Construction
- Parking: 603 spaces
- Cycle facilities: 1 bike locker
- Accessible: Yes

History
- Opened: September 13, 1993
Location

South Garland Transit Center is a bus-only mass transit station in the Zacha Junction neighborhood of Garland, Texas. The station is located on a frontage road of Interstate 635 and is operated by Dallas Area Rapid Transit (DART). The station has eight bus bays and services twelve bus routes. Routes at the station largely service Garland and East Dallas, with high-frequency connections to Downtown Dallas, Buckner station, and White Rock station.

The transit center previously shared its parking lot with a Cinemark-branded discount theater, which was constructed alongside the station. The theater closed in 2021.

== History ==
The area was originally serviced by South Garland Park & Ride, a park-and-ride lot located at the intersection of Northwest Highway and Jackson Drive, about a mile east of the current station. The lot was built in 1978 by the Dallas Transit System, DART's predecessor. Ridership at the lot was very high; in 1989, a route between it and North Garland Transit Center became the first DART route outside of Dallas to carry over 1,000 passengers per day.

In 1990, seeking to replace the lot, DART selected a 10-acre tract adjacent to Interstate 635 with plans to connect the site to proposed HOV lanes on I-635. When the landowner refused to sell, DART lobbied the city of Garland to obtain the land on its behalf through eminent domain. The move was controversial, as a less expensive site was available, though that site would not have enabled the HOV connection.

Construction of the transit center began in October 1992, and the station opened on September 13, 1993.
