= Buckingham, Richardson, Texas =

Human settlement in Texas, U.S.

Coordinates: 32°56′11″N 96°43′30″W

Buckingham is an area within Richardson, Texas, United States that was formerly a separate incorporated city. As of the 1990 census, the city had a total population of 102. Encompassing only 159 acres (0.6 km^{2}), Buckingham, near Dallas, was surrounded by Richardson.

In the early 1980s, real estate speculators bought most of the land, intending to create a planned development similar to the Las Colinas planned development in north Irving. To spur development, the residents voted to allow alcohol sales in the community before they were bought out. But the real estate market declined, and by the late 1980s, the development company went bankrupt.

The 1990s brought more development to the area, though not without causing conflicts with nearby Richardson residents. At one point, conflicts between the cities led to school zone signs being removed from one Buckingham road, leading parents to stand alongside the road waving flags to warn motorists to slow down.

In April 1996, though, conflicts between Buckingham and Richardson were resolved once and for all, when Buckingham's 159 acres (0.6 km^{2}) were annexed into the city of Richardson. Since it allowed alcohol sales before annexation, it remained "wet", although the vast majority of Richardson was at the time "dry". (With the other exception being a small area of land annexed into Richardson along SH 190.) Richardson residents voted on whether to allow beer and wine sales in the 2006 general election. The measure passed with 68% in favor, so Richardson is no longer considered "dry."

== Education ==
The area is zoned to the Richardson Independent School District.

Dallas County residents are zoned to Dallas College (formerly Dallas County Community College or DCCCD).
