= DFW Airport North station =

Commuter rail station in Grapevine, Texas

DFW Airport North
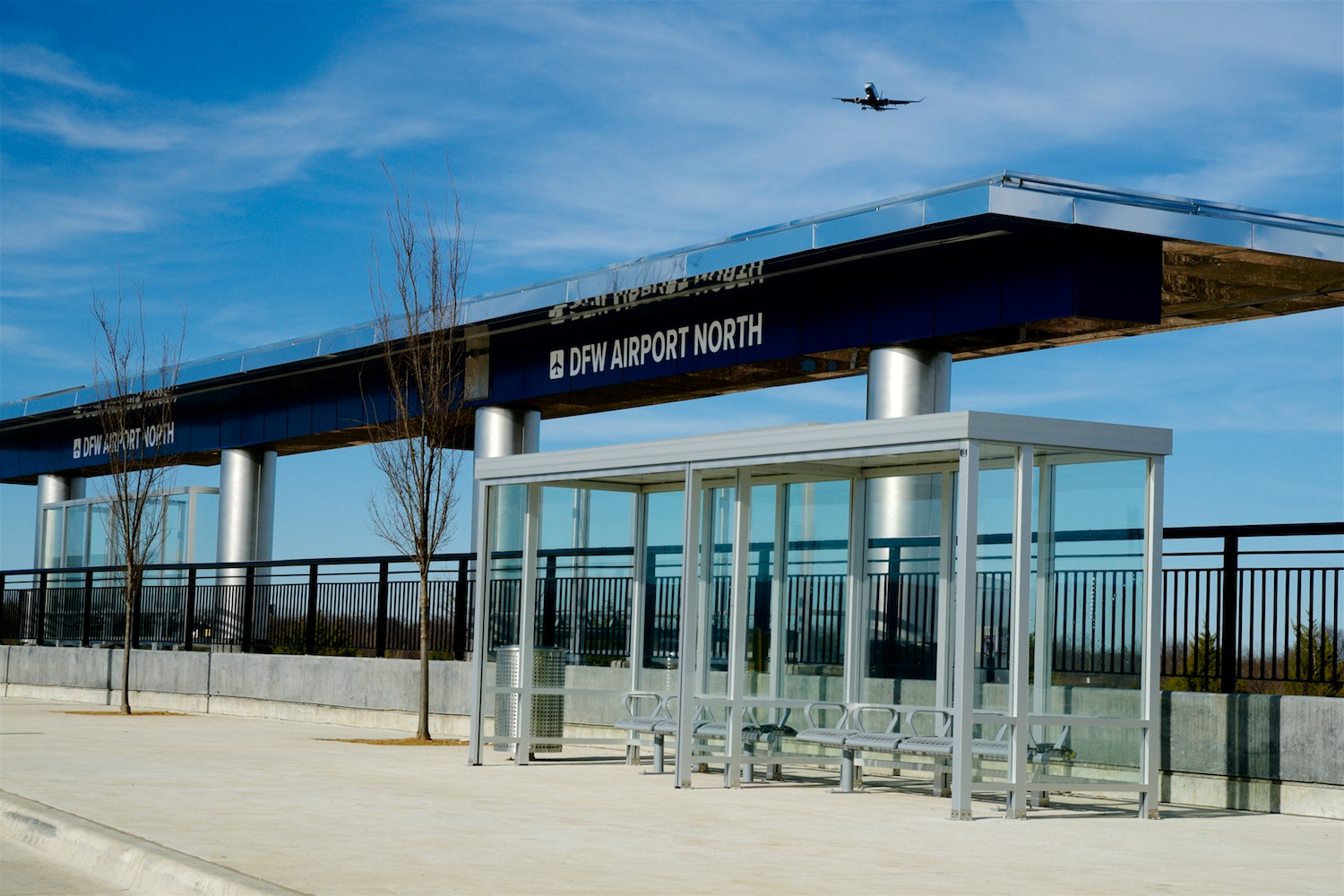
- TEXRail platform at DFW Airport North station (2018)

General information
- Location: 1867 East Dallas Road; Grapevine, Texas
- Coordinates: 32°56′02″N 97°03′15″W
- Owner: Dallas Area Rapid Transit and Trinity Metro
- Platforms: 1 side platform, 1 island platform
- Tracks: 3
- Connections: DART: Cypress Waters GoLink Zone (M-Sun)

Construction
- Structure type: At-grade
- Parking: 208 spaces
- Accessible: Yes

History
- Opened: January 10, 2019; 7 years ago (Note: Official opening date; station entered preview service on December 31, 2018)
- Rebuilt: 2025 (Note: Addition of island platform and tracks for Silver Line; opened October 25, 2025.)

Passengers
- April 2025: 1,200 (avg. monthly) ▲33.3% (TEXRail)

Services
Preceding station	Trinity Metro	Following station
Grapevine/Main Street toward T&P Station	TEXRail	DFW Airport Terminal B Terminus
Preceding station	DART	Following station
Cypress Waters toward Shiloh Road	Silver Line	DFW Airport Terminal B Terminus
Location

DFW Airport North station is a commuter rail station in Grapevine, Texas. The station is served by Trinity Metro's TEXRail and Dallas Area Rapid Transit's Silver Line. The station is located in the northwestern corner of Dallas Fort Worth International Airport, serving as both a park-and-ride and a transfer station between TEXRail and the Silver Line. The station does not provide access to airport facilities; passengers wishing to access airport terminals must ride one additional station to DFW Airport Terminal B.

As of May 2025, the station is the least-used on the TEXRail line, with approximately 1,200 riders per month.

== History ==
Unlike the Terminal B station, which was funded and designed by DFW Airport itself, DFW Airport North was constructed by the Fort Worth Transportation Authority (now Trinity Metro). A 2009 study proposed transit-oriented development in the area surrounding the station.

DFW Airport has said that they will provide $40 million to operate only the DFW Airport/Terminal B station, leaving Trinity Metro to operate this station. Revenue service commenced on January 10, 2019.

The station initially consisted of a single side platform and track for use by TEXRail, as well as an unused track for the planned Silver Line. In 2023, construction began on a second platform for use by the Silver Line, as well as a third track on the opposite side of the Silver Line platform. Silver Line service began on October 25, 2025.

== Gallery ==
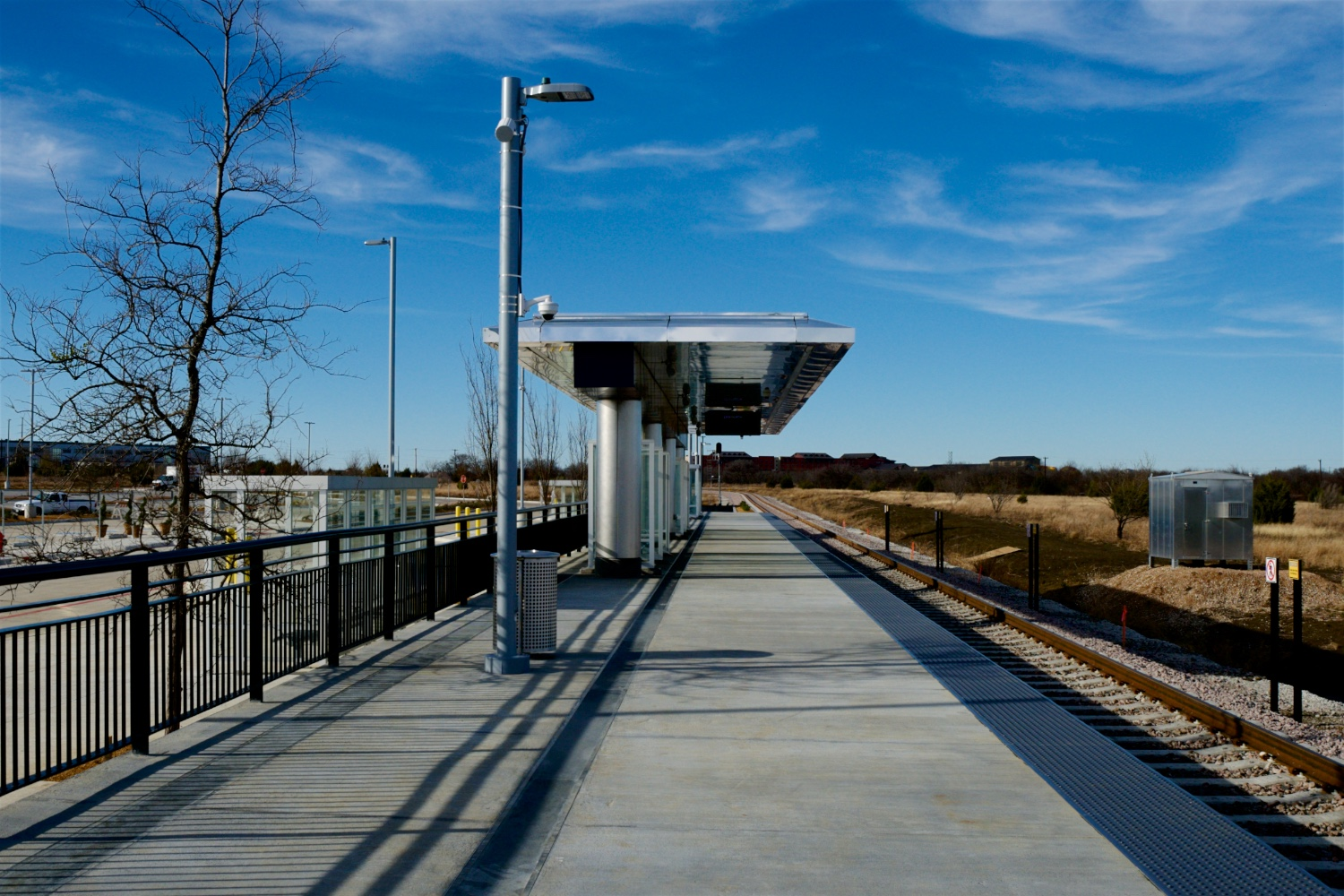
Main platform

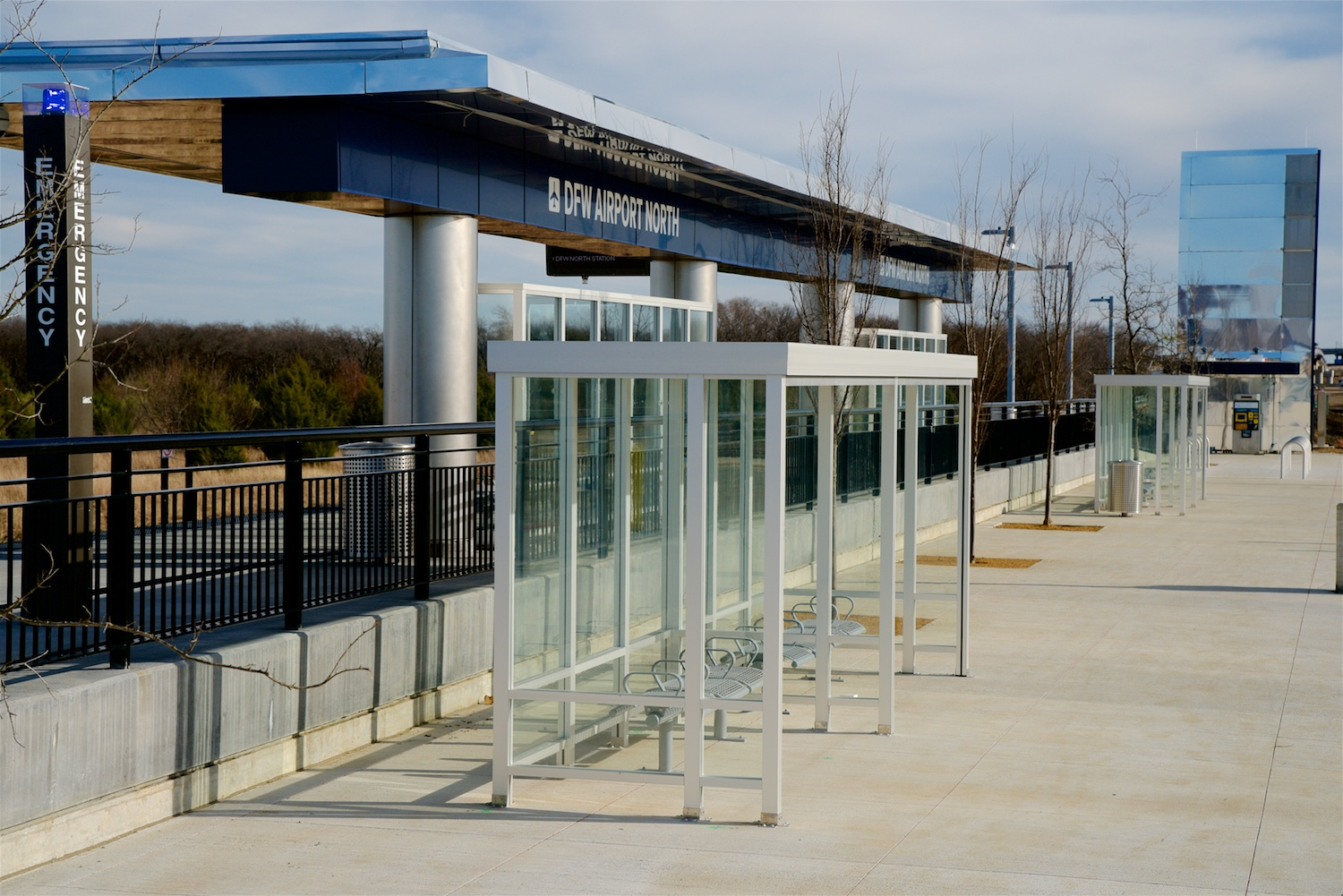
Bus waiting area
