= List of former transit companies in Dallas =

The following is a list of former privately run transit companies that served Dallas, Texas. The first year is the year service began. The last is the year private service was halted.

- 1872–1884 Dallas City Railroad Company (Main Street Line)
- 1875–1884 Dallas Street Railroad Company (San Jacinto Line)
- 1876–1887 Commerce and Ervay Street Railroad Company
- 1884–1887 Belt Street Railway
- 1884–1887 Dallas City and Dallas Street Railroad Company (merger between the Main and San Jacinto Lines)
- 1887–1890 Dallas Consolidated Street Railway Company (merger between the DC&DS, C&E and BSR)
- 1887–1900 Dallas and Oak Cliff Elevated Railway
- 1888–1898 Dallas Rapid Transit Company
- 1889–1892 North Dallas Circuit Railway
- 1890– North Dallas Railway Company
- 1890–1895 Dallas Consolidated Traction Railway Company (New owners changed the DCSR)
- 1892–1898 Queens City Railway Company
- 1895–1898 Dallas City Railway Company (New Company formed to take ownership of DCTRC, which went into receivership)
- 1898–1917 Dallas Consolidated and Electric Street Railway Company (acquired disposed property of the DCRC along with the QCRC)
- 1899–1917 Rapid Transit Railway Company (acquired the DRTC)
- 1900–1917 Northern Texas Traction Company (acquired the D&OCER)
- –1917 Metropolitan Street Railway Company
- 1917–1926 Dallas Railway Company (merger of DC&ESRC, RTRC and MSRC as well as leasing of lines along the NTTC in Oak Cliff)
- 1926–1956 Dallas Railway and Terminal Company (Name change from the DRC)
- 1956–1964 Dallas Transit Company (Name change from DR&T. In 1964, the city purchased the DTC, ending a 92-year run of private transit companies in Dallas)

== See also ==
- Current and Former Railroad Companies Operating in Dallas, Texas
