= UNT Dallas station =

DART rail station in Dallas, Texas

UNT Dallas
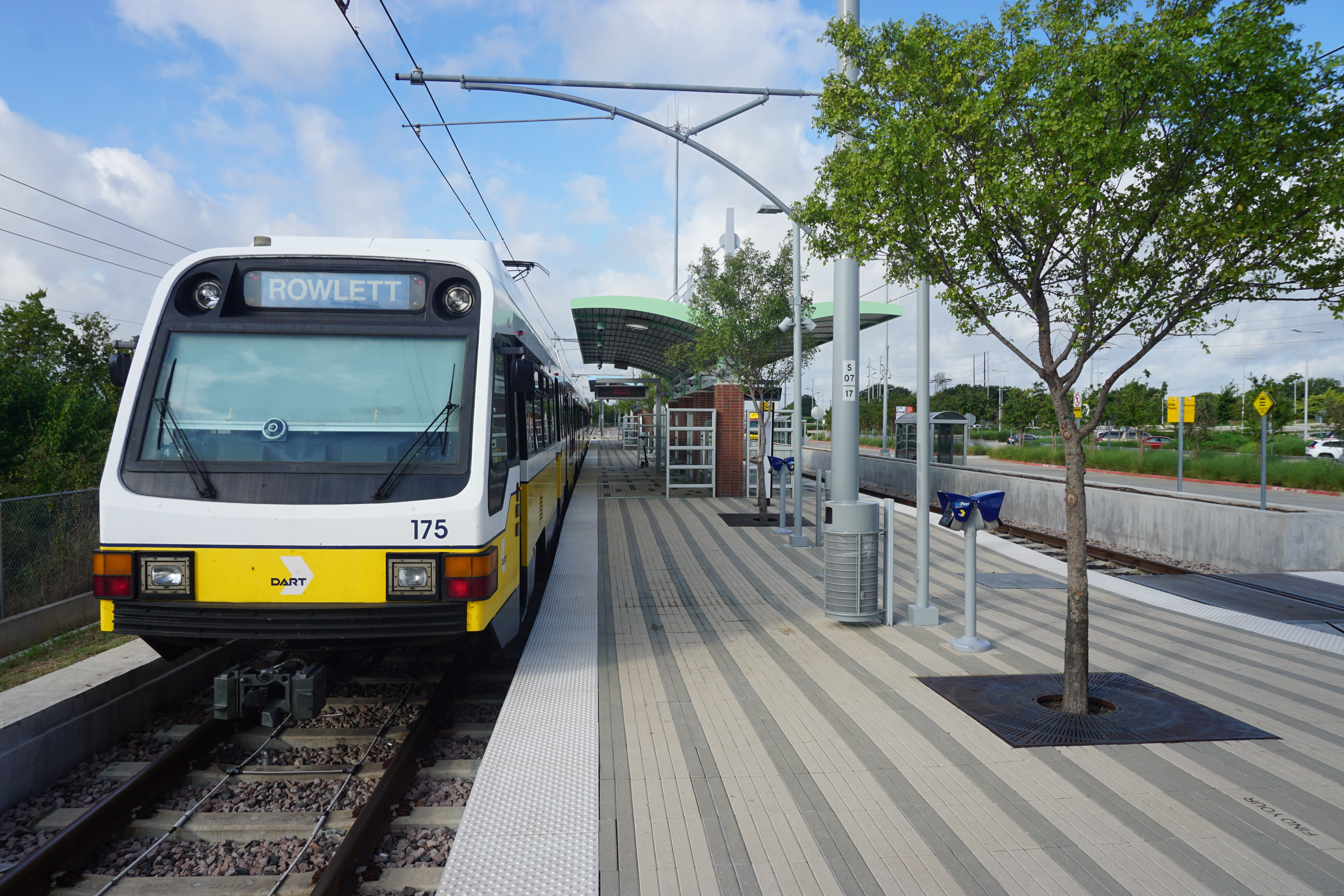

General information
- Location: 7300 University Hills Road; Dallas, Texas
- Coordinates: 32°39′15″N 96°48′04″W
- System: DART rail
- Owner: Dallas Area Rapid Transit
- Platforms: Island platform
- Tracks: 2
- Connections: Inland Port GoLink Zone (M-Sun); Glenn Heights GoLink Zone (M-Sun); STARNow: Cedar Hill, DeSoto, Duncanville, Hutchins, Lancaster, Wilmer

Construction
- Structure type: At-grade
- Parking: 457 spaces
- Accessible: yes

History
- Opened: October 24, 2016

Passengers
- FY 2025: 771 (avg. weekday) ▼4%

Services
Preceding station	DART	Following station
Terminus	Blue Line	Camp Wisdom toward Downtown Rowlett
Location

UNT Dallas station is a DART rail station in South Oak Cliff, Dallas, Texas. The station is located on University Hills Road, approximately 1/3 mile (0.54 km) southeast of the University of North Texas at Dallas campus and 3/4 mile (1.2 km) north of Interstate 20.

The station is the southern terminus of the Blue Line. In addition to the UNTD campus, the station serves as a park-and-ride lot for commuters on I-20 and I-35E. It also serves as a connection point for the microtransit services GoLink and STARNow, which serve southern Dallas County.

== History ==
UNT Dallas was constructed as the terminus of the South Oak Cliff extension, which extended the Blue Line south from Ledbetter. A groundbreaking for the extension was held on October 6, 2014, and the extension opened on October 24, 2016.
