= Trinity Mills station =

Train station in Carrollton, Texas

Trinity Mills
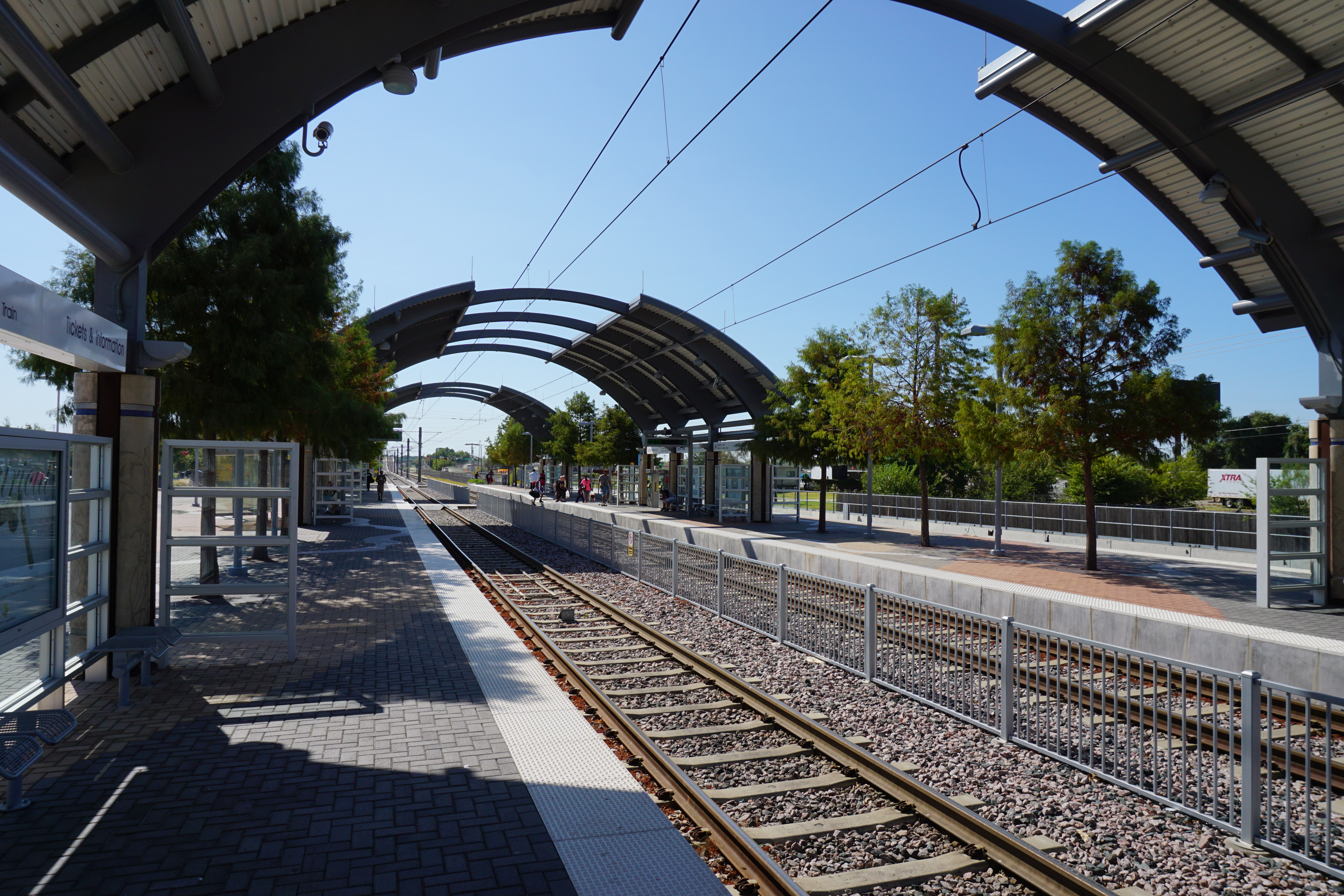

General information
- Location: 2525 Blanton Drive; Carrollton, TX 75008
- Coordinates: 32°58′50″N 96°55′34″W
- System: DART rail
- Owner: Dallas Area Rapid Transit
- Platforms: 1 side platform, 1 island platform
- Tracks: 3
- Connections: DART: 232; Keller Springs GoLink Zone (M-Sun); Lewisville/Highland Village GoZone (M-Sat nights, (Note: Outbound-only GoZone service is available Monday through Saturday nights for four hours after the last A-train departs) Sun all-day (Note: Both inbound and outbound GoZone service are available Sundays from 8 AM to 6 PM)); Denton GoZone (M-Sat nights, Sun all-day)

Construction
- Structure type: At grade
- Parking: 494 spaces
- Accessible: Yes

History
- Opened: December 6, 2010

Services
Preceding station	DART	Following station
North Carrollton/Frankford Terminus	Green Line	Downtown Carrollton toward Buckner
Preceding station	DCTA	Following station
Hebron toward Downtown Denton Transit Center	A-train	Terminus

Future services
Preceding station	DCTA	Following station
Hebron toward Downtown Denton Transit Center	A-train	Downtown Carrollton Terminus
Location

Trinity Mills station is a train station in Carrollton, Texas. It serves DART rail's Green Line and DCTA's A-train hybrid rail line. It is the southern terminus of the latter. On A-train maps, the station is represented by a yellow circle containing the DART logo.

The station is located at the intersection of Interstate 35E and the President George Bush Turnpike (PGBT). It is named for Trinity Mills Road, a frontage road for PGBT, which in turn is named after a mid-19th century settlement that was later annexed by Carrollton.

== History ==
=== North Carrollton Transit Center ===
North Carrollton Transit Center, located about 1/3 mile (0.54 km) east of the current station on Dickerson Parkway, opened on October 31, 1988. The transit center featured four bus bays and 1,047 parking spaces. It was one of the first DART stations with an indoor waiting facility, along with South Irving Transit Center.

The facility was serviced by several bus routes, most notably an express route between it and Downtown Dallas. When Trinity Mills opened, the express route was discontinued in favor of the Green Line, and all other routes were moved to Trinity Mills. The structure was demolished in 2016 during a widening of Dickerson Parkway.

=== Trinity Mills ===
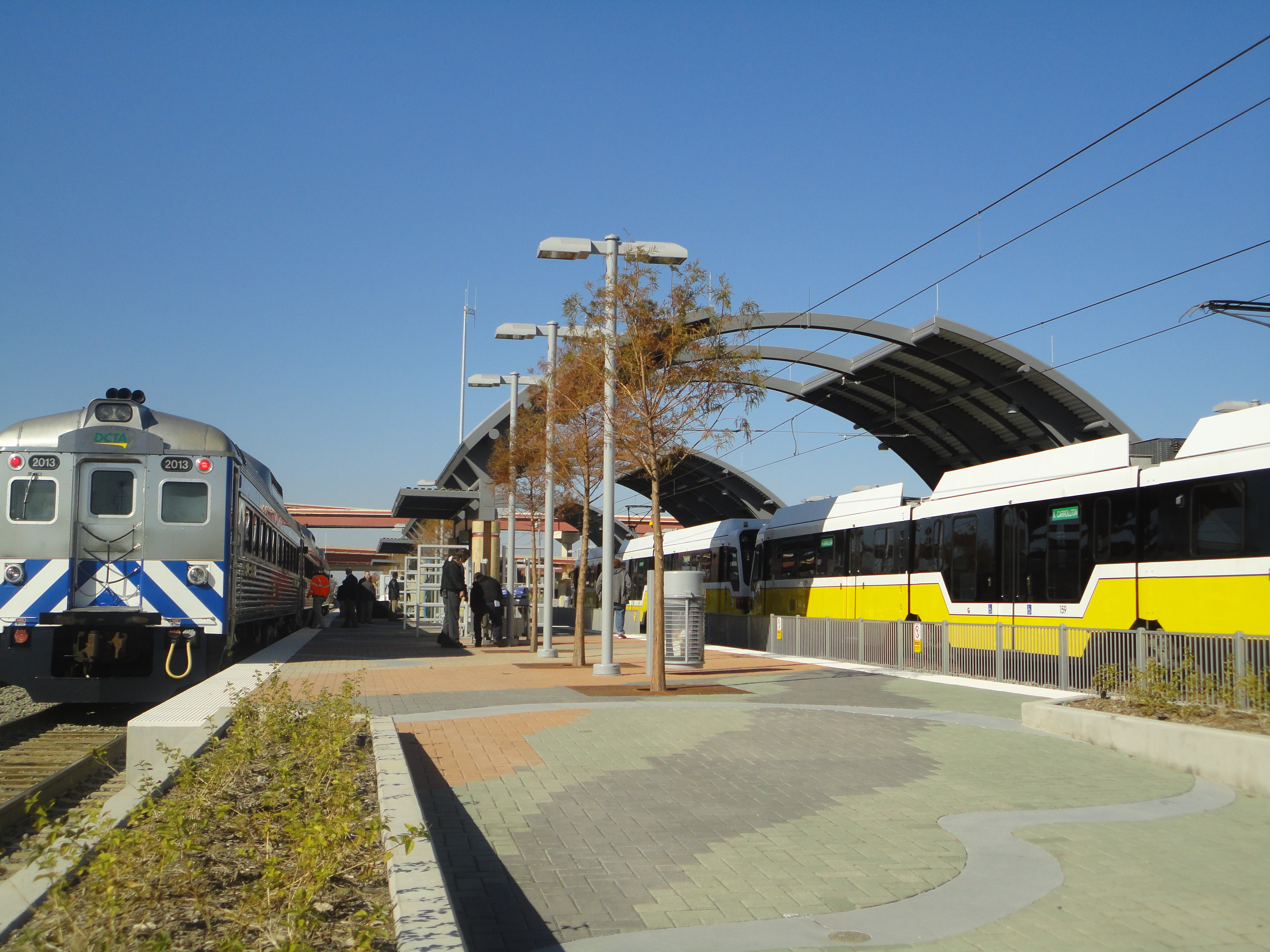
A Green Line train and A-Train meet for the first time.

In 2000, DART released an investment study on the "Northwest Corridor", which includes the present-day northern segments of the Green Line and Orange Line. The proposal included three stations in Carrolton, including one at North Carrollton Transit Center.

In 2002, the City of Carrollton proposed names for the three Carrollton stations on the corridor. The proposal named the station adjacent to North Carrollton Transit Center "Trinity Mills", moving the "North Carrollton" name to the terminus. This was done to ensure that "Carrollton" would appear on the train's destination signs.

In 2007, DART officials broke ground on the Green Line in Carrollton.

In late October 2010, DART offered a preview run of the Green Line, which ran between Downtown Carrollton and Trinity Mills, during the first annual Festival at the Switchyard. A month and a half later, on December 6, 2010, the Green Line's second expansion, including Trinity Mills, opened.

A-Train service began June 20, 2011 with a ceremonial ride from Downtown Denton Transit Center to Trinity Mills.

== Development ==
In 2003, Carrollton purchased a 12.5-acre (5.1 ha) site adjacent to Trinity Mills for the purposes of future development.

In 2020, Carrollton announced the creation of Trinity Mills Station, a transit-oriented development zone in a 25-acre (10 ha) site adjacent to the DART station.
