= Mercantile Center station =

Commuter rail station in Fort Worth, Texas

Mercantile Center
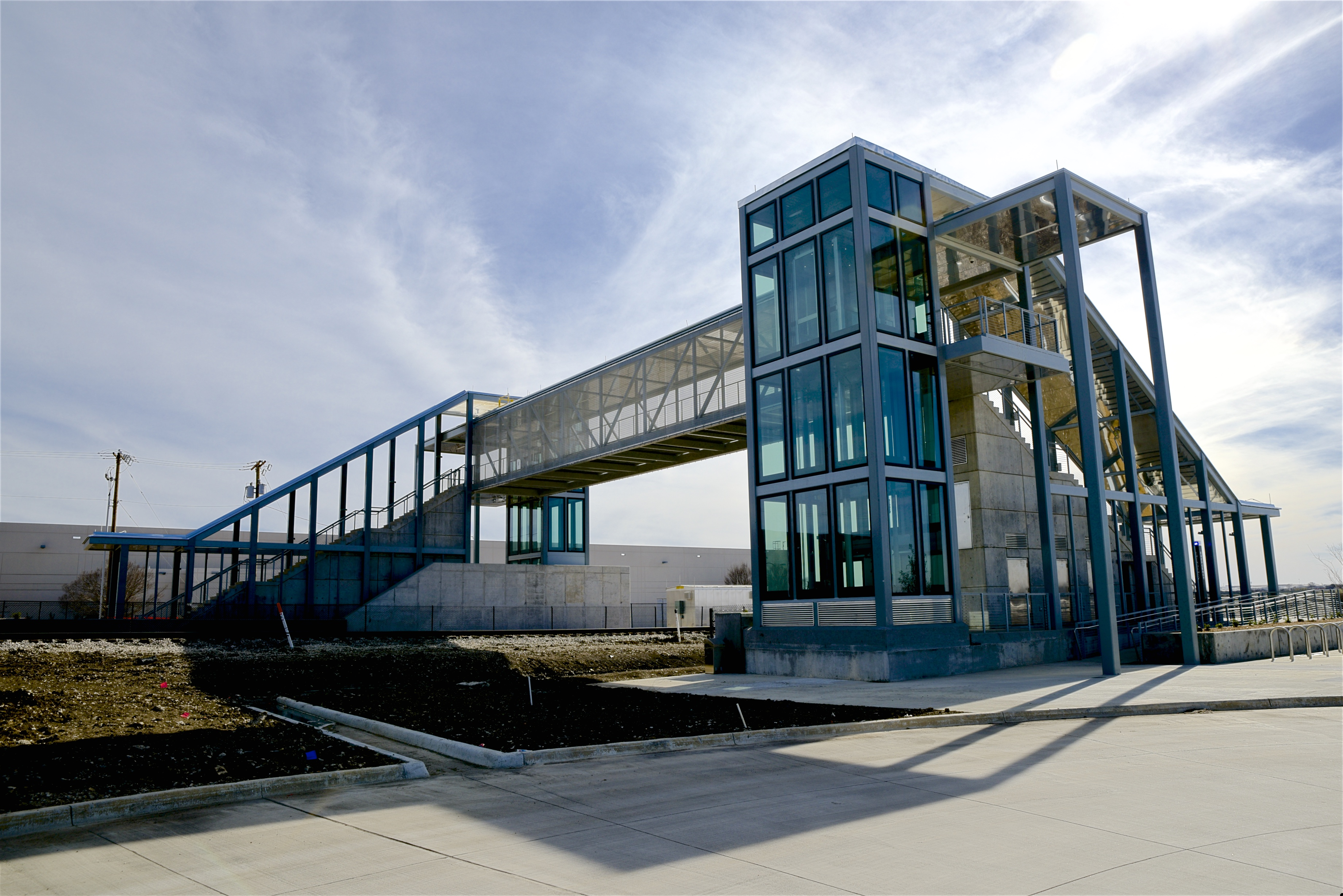
- Elevated pedestrian path between parking lot and station platform

General information
- Location: 4201 North Beach Street; Fort Worth, Texas
- Coordinates: 32.8193°N 97.2934°W
- Owner: Trinity Metro
- Platforms: Side platform
- Tracks: 1 + 1 through track
- Connections: Trinity Metro: 11, 16; Mercantile On-Demand

Construction
- Structure type: At-grade
- Parking: 318 spaces
- Cycle facilities: Bike racks
- Accessible: Yes

History
- Opened: January 10, 2019

Services
Preceding station	Trinity Metro	Following station
North Side toward T&P Station	TEXRail	North Richland Hills/Iron Horse toward DFW Airport Terminal B
Location

Mercantile Center station is a TEXRail commuter rail station in Mercantile Center, an industrial park in northeastern Fort Worth, Texas. The station primarily serves as a park-and-ride lot, though it is also a hub for microtransit service throughout the industrial park. Bus routes at the station connect it to Downtown Fort Worth and Alliance.

== Station ==
Mercantile Center is located along a former St. Louis Southwestern Railway corridor west of its intersection with Beach Street. The station is a single side platform south of the corridor used by both eastbound and westbound trains. The platform's seating shelters contain a set of murals by blind artist John Bramblitt.

North of the tracks is the station's parking lot, passenger drop-off area, bicycle racks, and bus stands. An active Fort Worth and Western Railroad freight corridor is located between the station platform and parking lot, so the two segments are connected by an elevated pedestrian walkway, which is accessible by stairs or elevators.

Mercantile Partners, the company which operates Mercantile Center, has identified a 200-acre (81 ha) site adjacent to the station for retail and residential development, though as of 2026 no development has taken place.

TEXRail's service yard is located between the North Side and Mercantile Center stations. Because of this, some westbound trains terminate at Mercantile Center to allow the vehicles to exit service.

== History ==
The station was originally named "Beach Street/Mercantile" after the adjacent street, but the name was changed to simply "Mercantile Center" in late 2016. The station opened with the TEXRail line on January 10, 2019.

In July 2019, Trinity Metro and the city of Fort Worth introduced Mercantile ZIPZONE, a pilot microtransit service operated in partnership with Via Transportation. The service, targeted to commuting workers, offered on-demand service to the Mercantile Center area. The pilot was a success, leading ZIPZONE (later renamed to Trinity Metro On-Demand) to be expanded to other areas in Fort Worth.
