= Trinity Metro =

Transit agency for Fort Worth and Tarrant County, Texas

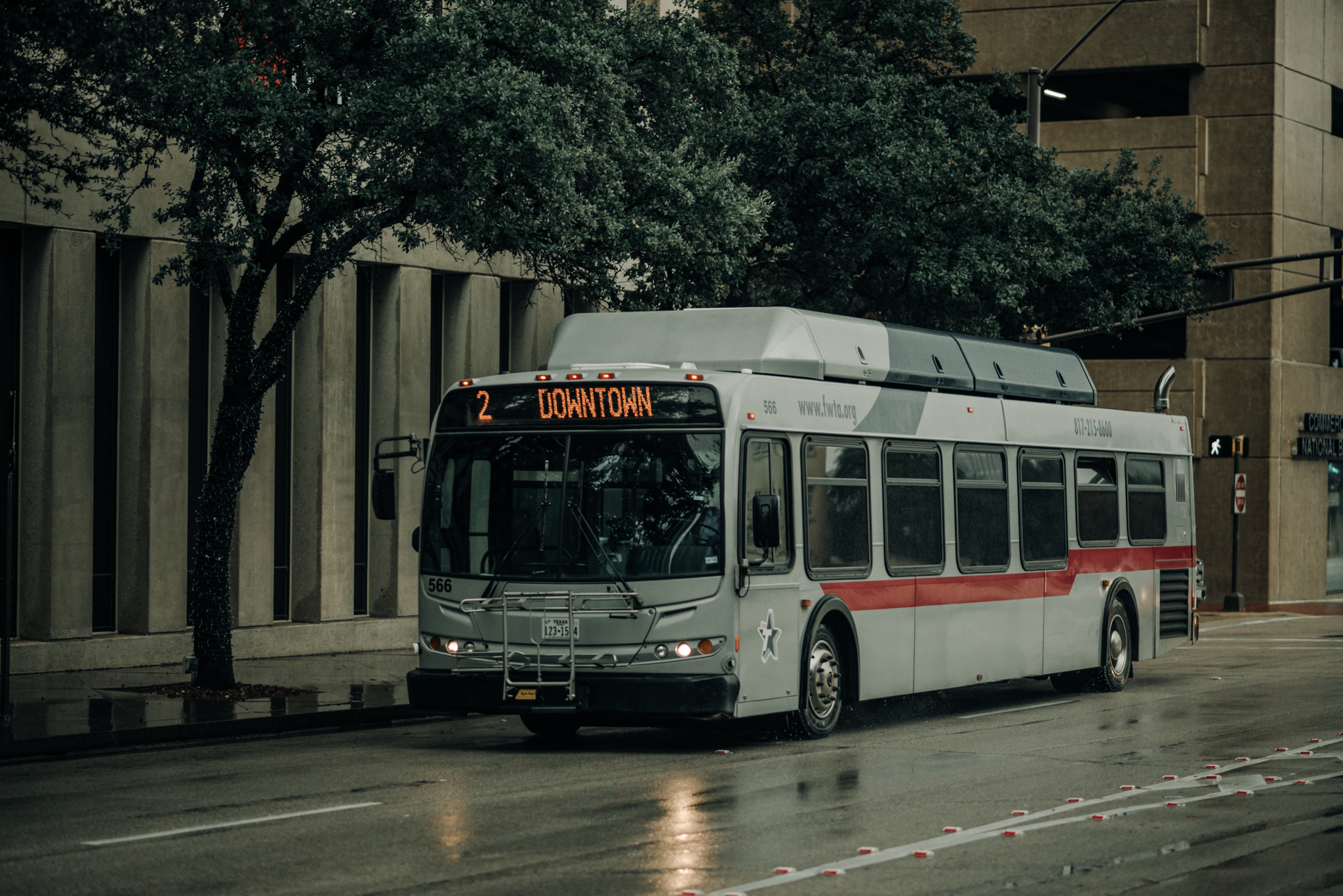

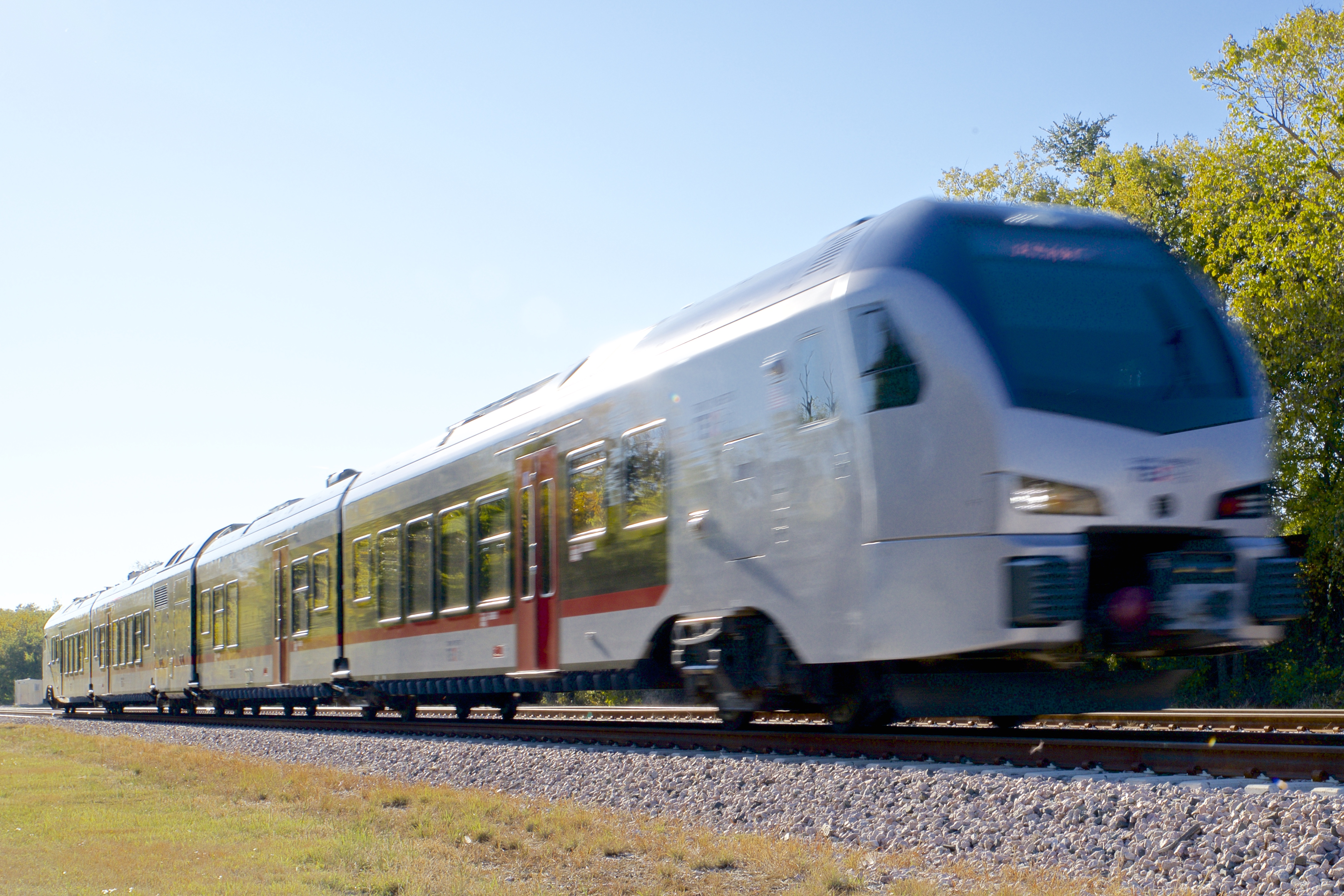

Overview
- Locale: Tarrant County, Texas
- Transit type: Bus, Commuter Rail, Paratransit
- Number of lines: 40+ (bus); 2 (commuter rail)
- Number of stations: 5 (bus hubs); 2,000+ (bus stops); 17 (commuter rail)
- Daily ridership: 22,100 (weekdays, Q2 2026)
- Annual ridership: 6,180,600 (2025)
- Chief executive: Richard Andreski
- Headquarters: 801 Grove Street; Fort Worth, Texas
- Website: ridetrinitymetro.org

Operation
- Number of vehicles: 147 fixed route 76 demand response

Trinity Metro is a transit agency located in and serving the city of Fort Worth, Texas and its suburbs in surrounding Tarrant County, part of the Dallas–Fort Worth metropolitan area. Since 1983, it was previously known officially as the Fort Worth Transportation Authority (FWTA), and branded itself as The T. As of January 29, 2018 the board of directors has voted to rebrand bus services as Trinity Metro, replacing the previous and long standing name. In 2025, the system had a ridership of 6,180,600, or about 22,100 per weekday as of the second quarter of 2026.

Trinity Metro primarily operates the region's bus service, and TEXRail, a hybrid rail system connecting downtown Fort Worth with DFW Airport via Northeast Tarrant County. The agency is also involved in the operation of the Trinity Railway Express (TRE) commuter rail line between from downtown Fort Worth and downtown Dallas in partnership with Dallas Area Rapid Transit and the North Texas Xpress (Route 64) express bus service in partnership with Denton County Transportation Authority.

== History ==
Through the early 1970s, bus transit services in Fort Worth were provided by City Transit Company, a private enterprise. Starting in 1974, the city's Traffic Engineering Department began coordinating bus operations. In 1978, the city established the Fort Worth Department of Transportation, which took over public transit operations. These operations included the City Transit Service (CITRAN) and the Surface Transportation Service (SURTRAN, a service jointly owned between the cities of Dallas and Fort Worth, shuttling passengers to and from DFW from stops in Dallas (including Dallas Union Station), Fort Worth and Arlington), with transportation services for the handicapped (MITS) being added in 1979.

On November 8, 1983, voters approved formation of The T. To finance the system, voters levied a half-cent sales tax. The CITRAN, SURTRAN, and MITS services were folded into the new agency, along with carpool and vanpool coordination.

The agency's first addition came on November 5, 1991 when the small suburb of Lake Worth voted 344–206 in favor of joining the T. That prompted three more elections on May 2, 1992 when Blue Mound, Forest Hill and Richland Hills had the issue of joining the agency on the ballot. Blue Mound and Richland Hills voted in favor while Forest Hill declined the measure nearly 2–1.

The T saw its first departure when voters in Lake Worth approved a pullout in September 2003. Service withdrawal became effective on March 21, 2004. Lake Worth had previously tried to pull out in 1996, but that measure failed. On November 8, 2016, Richland Hills residents voted to withdraw from the agency's services. FWTA's final day of service in Richland Hills was November 23, 2016.

In 2001, the FWTA saw its cooperation efforts with DART pay off as the Trinity Railway Express reached downtown Fort Worth. The other end of the line terminates in downtown Dallas.

The TRE commuter line has a daily ridership of 9,100 and is the thirteenth most-ridden commuter rail system in the country.

On August 24, 2016, Trinity Metro broke ground on TEXRail, the second commuter rail project undertaken by the agency, and the first built solely by Trinity Metro. The rail line was initially envisioned to run along the existing Cotton Belt Railway Corridor (Note: The Cotton Belt Corridor is a 56-mile disused rail line, running between Wylie and the Fort Worth Stockyards. It was purchased by DART in 1993.) from DFW airport to the Fort Worth Stockyards, head South along Union Pacific owned track to the Fort Worth Central Station, and continue along Fort Worth & Western Railroad tracks to Benbrook Lake. As of the FWTA 2015 master plan, citing "project costs and other considerations", the agency decided to build the 27 mile Minimum Operable Segment (MOS) between downtown Fort Worth and DFW Terminal B. The other considerations likely included stalled negotiations with Fort Worth & Western, Union Pacific, and DART, over securing right of way for TEXRail trains. The MOS included 2 new stations in Fort Worth, one in Grapevine, two at DFW Airport, and 3 potential stations in North Richland Hills and Haltom City. The three potential stations were conditional on either city joining the Trinity Metro service area, which requires imposing a half-cent sales tax to help fund the agency. (Note: Texas law limits local governments to a sales tax of, at most, 2%) North Richland Hills joined Trinity Metro in 2018, while Haltom City never did, as a result, two stations were built in North Richland Hills, and the Haltom City station was not. The MOS was completed, and TEXRail began service between downtown Fort Worth and DFW airport on January 10, 2019, with free rides until January 31, 2019 to " give everyone an opportunity to ride".

On January 29, 2018, the transit agency's board of directors voted to rebrand FWTA/The T as Trinity Metro, and revealed a new logo, that depicts three triangles forming the letter "M" in its negative spaces. The name change officially took place on March 23, 2018 on its website and social media presence.

== Member cities ==
Full member cities of Trinity Metro are required to levy a 1/2¢ sales tax to pay for the system. Because the state of Texas caps the total sales tax for a municipality at 2¢, many municipalities are unable to join without reducing their sales tax revenue.

In lieu of full membership, Trinity Metro allows cities to gain service through interlocal agreements. For example, Grapevine and North Richland Hills made agreements in 2006 and 2016, respectively, to obtain stations on the then-planned TEXRail line.

=== Current members ===
City	Year Joined	Member status	Notes
Forest Hill	2023	Partial	Forest Hill is serviced by the Southeast On-Demand service.
Fort Worth	1983	Full	Fort Worth hosts the vast majority of Trinity Metro services, including its main transfer center (Fort Worth Central), four TEXRail stations (from T&P to Mercantile Center), and five TRE stations (from T&P to CentrePort/DFW).
Grapevine	2006	Partial	Grapevine is serviced by two TEXRail stations: DFW Airport North and Grapevine–Main Street. The city funds its stations through a 3/8¢ sales tax.
North Richland Hills	2016	Partial	North Richland Hills is serviced by two TEXRail stations: North Richland Hills/Iron Horse and North Richland Hills/Smithfield. The city funds its stations under an agreement with Trinity Metro.
River Oaks	2017	Partial	River Oaks receives paratransit service through Trinity Metro's ACCESS. The city was also serviced by one bus route (route 91) from 2017 to 2024.

=== Former members ===
City	Year Joined	Year Left	Member status	Notes
Blue Mound	1992	2024	Full	Blue Mound was serviced by ACCESS Paratransit and the Mercantile ZIPZONE, an on-demand service. The city left Trinity Metro following a successful pull-out election in May 2024.
Crowley	2020	2024	Partial	Crowley was serviced by the South Tarrant ZIPZONE (originally Crowley ZIPZONE), an on-demand service, with funding from a federal CMAQ grant. Service to the city ended in 2024 after the grant expired.
Everman	2021	2024	Partial	Everman was serviced by the South Tarrant ZIPZONE, an on-demand service, with funding from a federal CMAQ grant. Service to the city ended in 2024 after the grant expired.
Lake Worth	1991	2003	Full	Lake Worth was serviced by a flexible-service route, Lake Worth Rider Request. The city left FWTA following a successful pull-out election in September 2003.
Mansfield	2024	2025	Partial	Mansfield was serviced by Mansfield On-Demand with funding from an NCTCOG grant. Service to the city ended in 2025 after the grant expired.
Richland Hills	1992	2016	Full	Richland Hills was serviced by the TRE Richland Hills station and by a flexible-service route, Richland Hills Rider Request. The city left FWTA following a successful pull-out election in November 2016. The TRE station remained open until 2024, when it was replaced by the Trinity Lakes station in Fort Worth.

== Services ==
=== Rail ===
TEXRail, opened in 2018, is a hybrid rail service connecting downtown Fort Worth and DFW Airport. The train travels through northeast Tarrant County with four stops in Fort Worth, two stops in North Richland Hills and three stops (including at the airport) in Grapevine.

Trinity Railway Express, opened in 1996, is a commuter rail service connecting downtown Fort Worth and downtown Dallas. The train travels on a former Rock Island throughway with five stops in Fort Worth, two stops in Irving, and three stops in Dallas. The line is jointly operated with Dallas Area Rapid Transit; Trinity Metro manages the stations in Tarrant County (from T&P Station to CentrePort/DFW Airport).

=== Bus routes ===
As of September 15, 2026, Trinity Metro operates twenty-three bus routes, three express routes, and one specialty service. The bus network travels throughout Fort Worth, with its main hub at Fort Worth Central Station. The system has three additional transfer locations and two park-and-rides.

Prior to Fort Worth Central's opening in 2001, the main downtown transit hub centered around bus lines all converging along the Houston/Throckmorton corridor, with northbound service on Throckmorton Street and southbound service on Houston Street.

Category	Routes	Peak Frequency (min.)	Notes
Local	2, 4, 5, 6, 25, 89	15	
Local	11, 16, 21, 22, 24, 46, 54, 55, 91	30	
Local	29, 33, 51, 52, 53, 72	60	
Limited	30, LINK	20 - 30	Limited routes travel to locations around CentrePort/DFW Airport station.
Xpress	61X, 63X, 65X	30 - 60	Xpress routes connect suburban park-and-ride locations to Fort Worth Central station with no stops in between. These routes only operate during weekday peak times.
Specialty	LL	15	Specialty routes are short shuttle routes.

==== Trolley routes ====
Trinity Metro currently operates three "trolley routes", which are tourist-friendly routes with color-coded branding and liveries. (Despite the "trolley" designation, the routes do not use trolley-replica buses.)

- The Blue Line, introduced in 2009 as Molly the Trolley, is a free-to-ride circulator in Downtown Fort Worth. It stops at major downtown destinations such as Sundance Square, the Fort Worth Convention Center, and the Fort Worth Water Gardens, as well as both downtown commuter rail stations (Fort Worth Central and T&P).
- The Orange Line, introduced in 2024, connects the Fort Worth Stockyards to Downtown Fort Worth (including Fort Worth Central Station) and the North Side TEXRail station.
- La Línea Rosa (the Pink Line), introduced in 2026, connects Downtown to Near Southside and La Gran Plaza de Fort Worth.

A fourth trolley route, the Green Line, has been proposed. It would serve the Fort Worth Zoo.

From 2019 to 2024, Trinity Metro operated The Dash, a shuttle route which connected Fort Worth Central station to the Cultural District and Dickies Arena using red-colored electric buses. The route was discontinued due to low ridership.

==== Fleet ====
As of 2026, Trinity Metro's bus fleet consists of the following:

- Gillig Low Floor CNG 29’
- Gillig Low Floor CNG 35’
- Gillig Low Floor Plus CNG 35’
- Gillig Low Floor CNG 40’
- New Flyer XE35
- New Flyer XN60

=== On-Demand ===
Launched in July 2019, On-Demand (formerly ZIPZONE) is a curb-to-curb microtransit service operated in partnership with Via Transportation. The service allows riders to book trips on-demand (using an app or phone number) so long as each trip starts and ends within specially designated zones. Travel between zones is not permitted, though some zones overlap. The service costs $1-3 per ride and is included with multi-ride passes.

Trinity Metro previously offered a separate curb-to-curb service in the Alliance neighborhood, which offered a complimentary Lyft ride through a promotional code. The service was replaced with a standard On-Demand zone on July 15, 2024.

Zone	Hours	Points of Interest	Connections
Alliance	4:30 AM - 7:30 PM (Mon - Fri); 5:30 AM - 7:30 AM and 4:00 PM - 7:30 PM (Sat - Sun)	Alliance Town Center; BNSF Alliance; Perot Field Fort Worth Alliance Airport; Texas Motor Speedway	Bus: 16, 63X
Mercantile	5:30 AM - 9:00 PM (Mon - Fri)	Fort Worth Meacham International Airport; Medical City Alliance	TEXRail: North Side and Mercantile Center; Bus: 11, 16, 54, 91, Orange Line
North Side	5:30 AM - 9:00 PM (Mon - Fri); 7:00 AM - 7:00 PM (Sat - Sun)	North Tri-Ethnic Community Center; Tarrant County College Northwest Campus	TEXRail: North Side; Bus: 46, 53, 54, 91, Orange Line
Southeast	7:00 AM - 7:00 PM (Mon - Fri)	City of Forest Hill; Tarrant County College South Campus; Tarrant County College Southeast Campus	Bus: 4, 5, 24, 25, 33, 54, 55
Southside	6:00 AM - 8:00 PM (Sun - Wed); 6:00 AM - 12:00 AM (Thu - Sat)	Cook Children's Medical Center; Fort Worth Botanic Garden; Fort Worth Zoo; Medical City Fort Worth; Texas Christian University; Texas Health Harris Methodist; Texas Wesleyan University	TEXRail and TRE: T&P Station; Bus: 2, 4, 5, 6, 24, 52, 53, 54, Línea Rosa
South Tarrant	7:00 AM - 7:00 PM (Mon - Fri)	Crowley ISD Multi-Purpose Stadium; South Park & Ride; Tarrant County College South Campus; Texas Health Huguley	Bus: 5, 6, 33, 52, 65X, 72
TCC Northeast	7:00 AM - 7:00 PM (Mon - Fri)	Tarrant County College Northeast Campus	TRE: Trinity Lakes

=== Trinity Metro Bikes ===
Operated in association with Lyft Urban Solutions, Trinity Metro Bikes is a short-term bike rental service. Users check out electric bikes from docking stations across Fort Worth and ride them for the duration set according to pass purchased. This service is not included with any Trinity Metro tickets; bike-exclusive passes are available on the TM Bikes app.

=== VANPOOL ===
VANPOOL is a service which allows groups of five to fifteen people to collectively rent an SUV or van for travel to and from work, with prices varying based on the type of vehicle and distance traveled by each rider. Trinity Metro covers the cost of registration, insurance, fuel, and maintenance, though they do not cover tolls.

The service is open to riders in eleven counties: Dallas, Ellis, Erath, Hood, Johnson, Navarro, Palo Pinto, Parker, Somervell, Tarrant, and Wise. A similar service operated by DCTA operates in the rest of the Metroplex.

=== ACCESS Paratransit ===
ACCESS Paratransit (originally Mobility Impaired Transit Services, or MITS) is an ADA-compliant paratransit service for riders with disabilities that prevent them from using standard Trinity Metro services. The service allows eligible patrons to schedule curb-to-curb transportation to any location in Fort Worth or River Oaks.

== List of Bus Routes ==
=== Current ===
- 2 – Camp Bowie
- 4 – East Rosedale
- 5 – Evans Ave/TCC South
- 6 – 8th Ave/McCart
- 11 – North Beach/Mercantile Center
- 16 – Alliance Town Center/Mercantile Center Station
- 21 – Boca Raton
- 22 – Meadowbrook
- 24 – Berry Street
- 25 – Miller/E. Seminary
- 29 - West Seminary/Hulen Mall
- 33 - Felix/Oak Grove
- 46 – Jacksboro Highway
- 51 – Bryant Irvin
- 52 – Hulen
- 53 – University
- 54 – Riverside/Sylvania
- 55 – Handley
- 72 – Hemphill/Sycamore School Rd
- 89 – SPUR/East Lancaster
- 91 – Normandale/North Side Station

==== Xpress/Limited routes ====
- 30 – CentrePort Circulator (Amon Carter Loop / East Loop / West Loop)
- 31 – TRE Link (CentrePort/DFW Airport station–DFW Airport Terminal B station)
- 61X – Normandale Xpress
- 63X – North Park & Ride Xpress
- 65X – South Park & Ride Xpress

==== Trolleys/Special services ====
- Orange Line (Stockyards)
- LL – Burnett Plaza Lunch Line
- Blue Line
- Línea Rosa

=== Eliminated ===
- 1 Hemphill (La Línea Rosa)
- 1N North Main (became 15, now Orange Line)
- 1S Hemphill (became 1, now La Línea Rosa)
- 2W Camp Bowie
- 2E East Lancaster (now 89 SPUR)
- 3 S. Riverside/TCC South
- 7 University Drive
- 8 Riverside/Evans (Sunday Only)
- 9 Ramey/Vickery
- 10 Bailey
- 12 Samuels/Mercantile Center
- 15 North Main/Stockyards (Orange Line)
- 16 Downtown Trolley
- 16 Rosedale/Montgomery
- 17 Central Avenue
- 20 Handley
- 23 TCC Northeast Campus/TRE Trinity Lakes Station
- 23 Mercantile
- 26 Ridgmar Mall/Normandale
- 27 Como/Ridgmar Mall
- 28 Mansfield Hwy
- 28 Diamond Hill
- 29 TCU Frog Shuttle (earlier TCU Circulator)
- 31 Sycamore School Road
- 31 Stonegate/TCU Shuttle
- 32 Bryant Irvin
- 40 Bridgewood
- 41 Richland Hills Rider Request
- 42 Southeast Rider Request
- 43 Town Center Rider Request/Fixed
- 44 Central/Azle Ave
- 44 Altamesa Rider Request
- 45 Azle-Angle Ave/TCC Northwest
- 45 Forest Park/Mistletoe Heights
- 46 Lake Worth Rider Request
- 47 Northsider Rider Request
- 48 Northside (originally Samuels)
- 57 Como/Montgomery
- 60X Eastside Express (Temporarily Suspended)
- 62 Summerfields Express
- 64 East Lancaster Express
- 64X North Texas Express (Alliance/Denton)
- 66X Candleridge/Altamesa Express
- 67X TCC Southeast Campus Express
- 67 Dallas Express
- 67 Lamar Blvd. Park & Ride
- 68 Park Springs Park & Ride
- 69 Alliance Express
- 71 Forest Hill
- 82 Southeast Zone Rider Request
- 83 Southeast Zone Rider Request
- 90 Long Ave
- 111 Bell Helicopter Shuttle
- 991 Juror Shuttle
- THE DASH
- Molly The Trolley (Blue Line)

== Labor relations ==
From November 6, 2006 through November 11, 2006, around 100 of FWTA's union workers went on strike, citing the agency's policy regarding termination of employees who had used up their short-term disability benefits. This represented about a third of the workers represented by Teamsters Local 997. Service continued with delays the next morning by non-striking drivers, and FWTA began advertising for replacement drivers. During the dispute, bus rides on FWTA were free, and the agency announced that monthly pass holders will receive a 25% discount on their December passes. By Friday, replacement workers and other drivers willing to cross the picket lines had restored service to normal levels.

FWTA offered a new contract proposal late in the week, which was rejected on Saturday by a vote of 37 to 21. But because less than half of the 155 union members voted, a 2/3 majority of the vote was required to reject the contract. That would have required 39 of the 58 votes, so the contract was declared "accepted".

Service on the Trinity Railway Express was not affected, as the rail line's employees work under a different contract.

Nine years earlier, a four-day strike in 1997 shut down 75% of The T's service.
