= North Side station (Trinity Metro) =

Fort Worth commuter-rail station

North Side
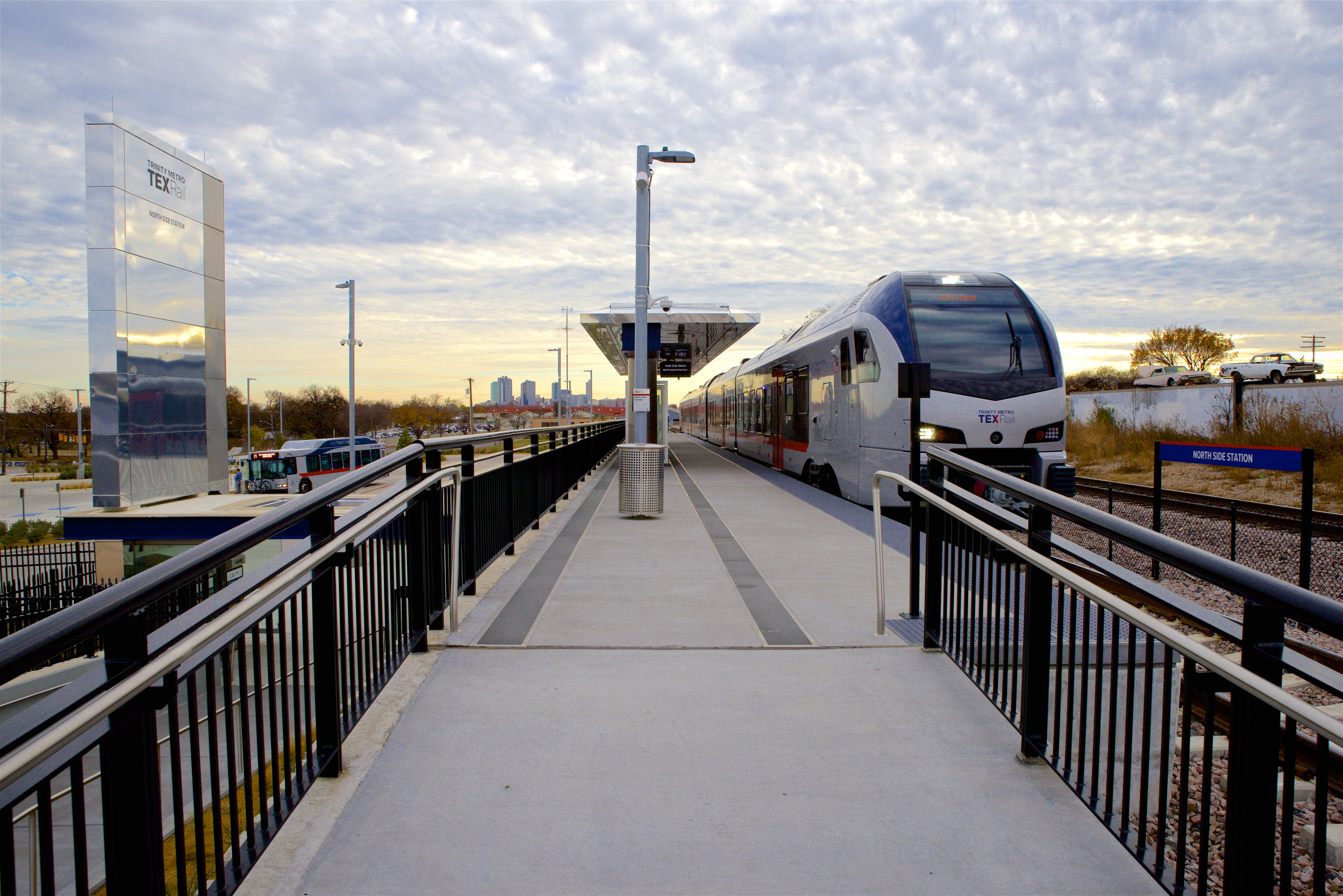

General information
- Location: 2829 Decatur Ave. Fort Worth, TX 76106
- Coordinates: 32.7959°N 97.3381°W
- Owner: Trinity Metro
- Platforms: 1 side platform
- Connections: Trinity Metro: 12, 54, 94, Orange Line; On-Demand: Mercantile, North Side

Construction
- Structure type: At-grade
- Parking: 164 spaces
- Accessible: Yes

History
- Opened: January 10, 2019

Services
Preceding station	Trinity Metro	Following station
Fort Worth Central Station toward T&P Station	TEXRail	Mercantile Center toward DFW Airport Terminal B
Location

North Side station is a TEXRail commuter rail station in Fort Worth, Texas. The station is owned and operated by Trinity Metro. It services the North Side district and is the primary transfer point for service to the Fort Worth Stockyards.

The station platform contains three murals by artist Merri Ellen Kase. Two of the murals depict the cowboy culture of the Stockyards, while the third depicts Day of the Dead in tribute to North Side's Hispanic population.

== Service ==
North Side station is the northern terminus of the Orange Line, a bus route which services the Fort Worth Stockyards.

The station is located within two of Trinity Metro's on-demand service zones. The Mercantile zone serves northern Fort Worth (excluding Alliance, which uses a separate zone), and the North Side zone serves the eponymous district.

TEXRail's service yard is located between the North Side and Mercantile Center stations. Because of this, westbound trains entering service start at North Side and eastbound trains exiting service terminate at North Side.

== History ==
North Side station was an inaugural station on TEXRail, opening on January 10, 2019 with the rest of the line. The station replaced the North Side Transfer Center, a bus-only stop on Houston Street.

== Gallery ==
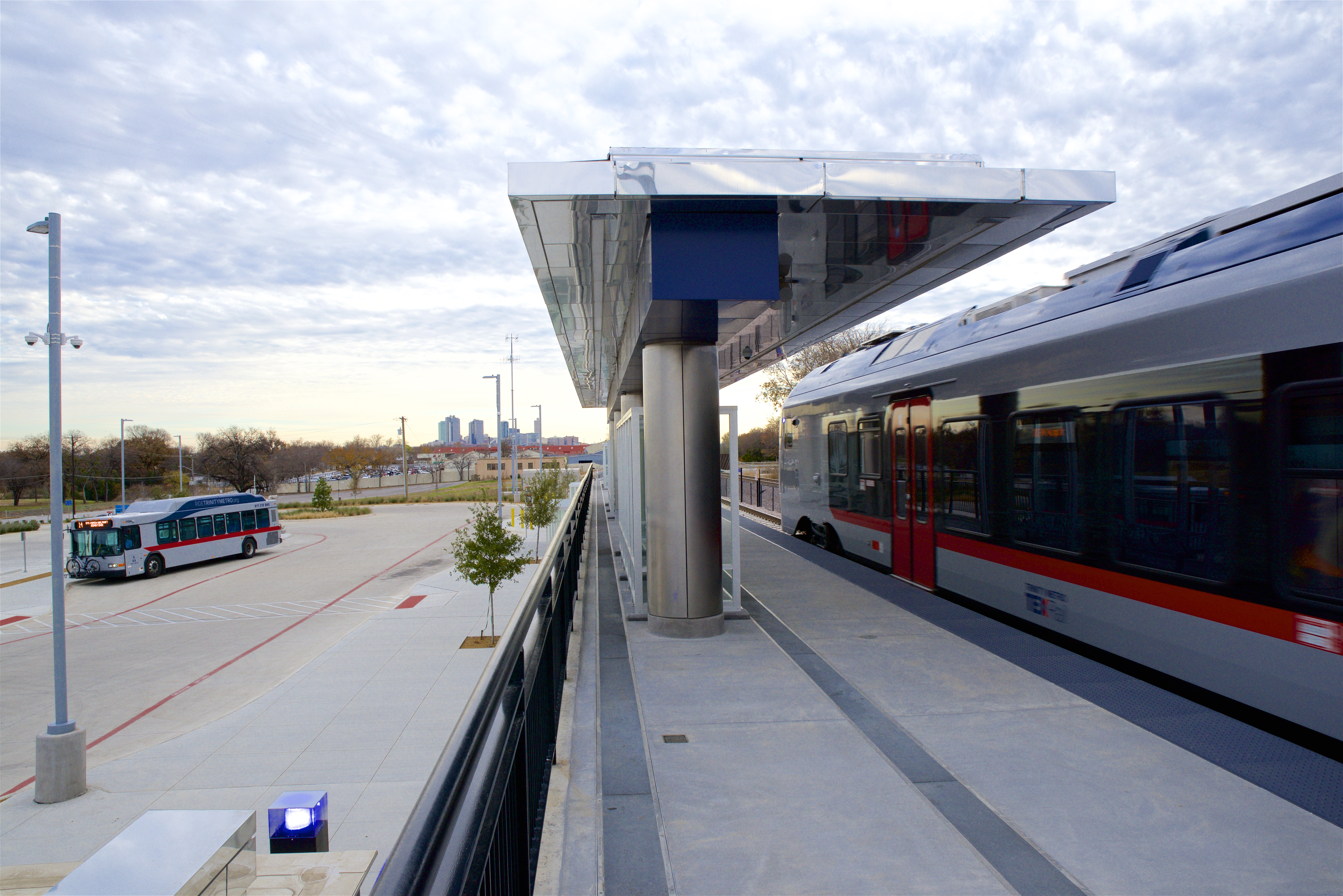
View from the rail platform; downtown Fort Worth is visible in the background.

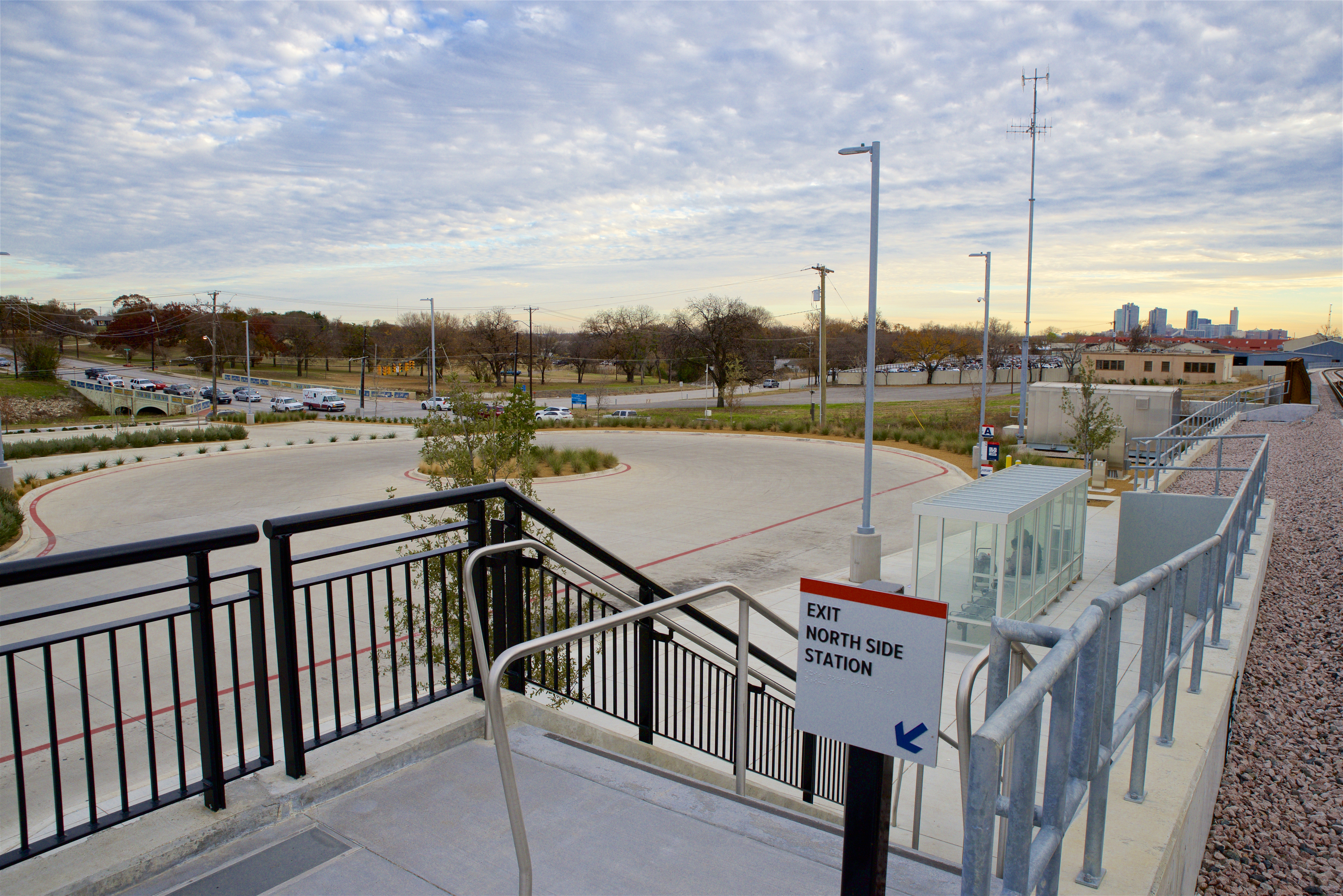
Staircase to lower level with bus stops and parking lot. A dedicated bus-only lane includes a roundabout for buses to turn around and exit the station.

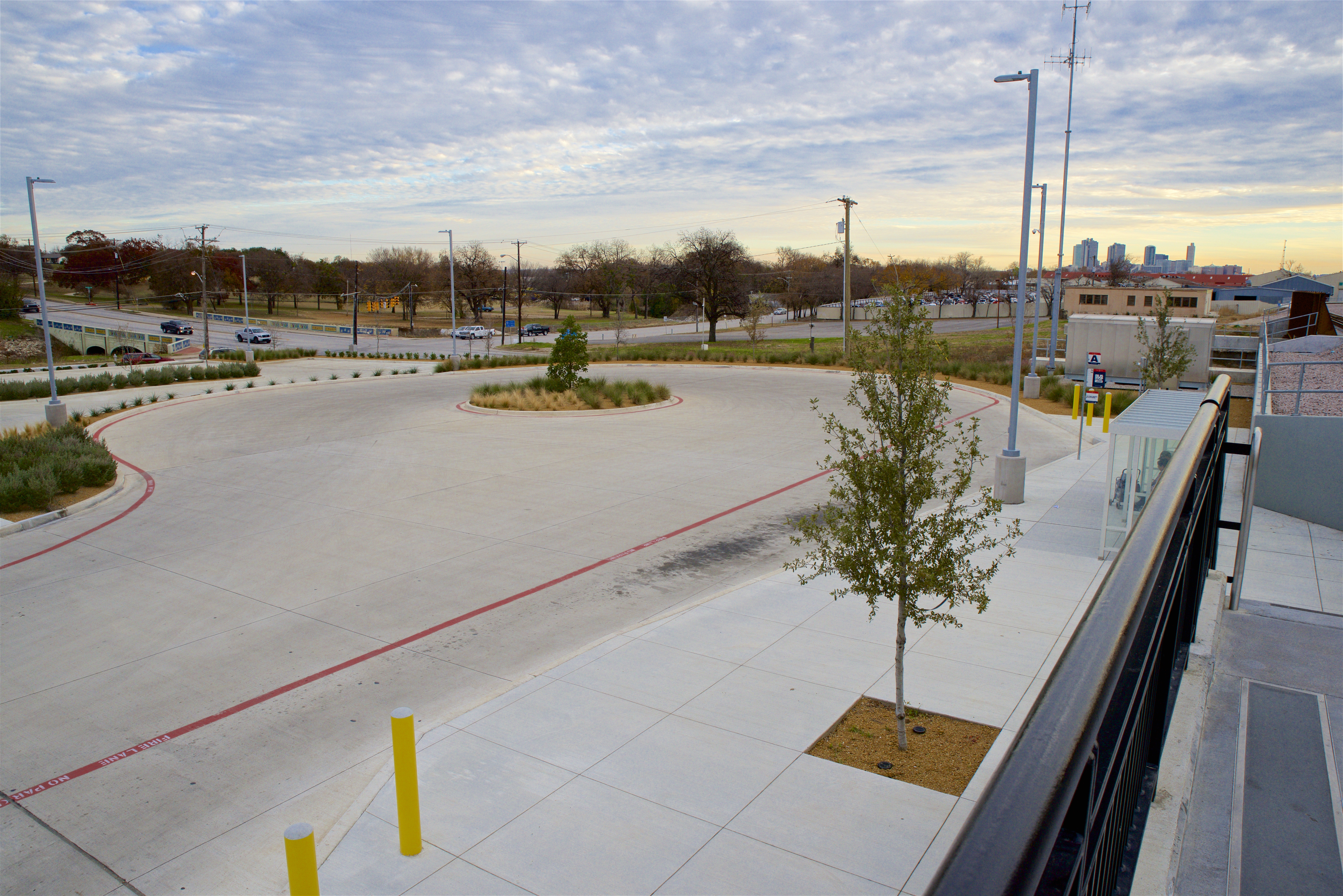
Additional view of bus roundabout.

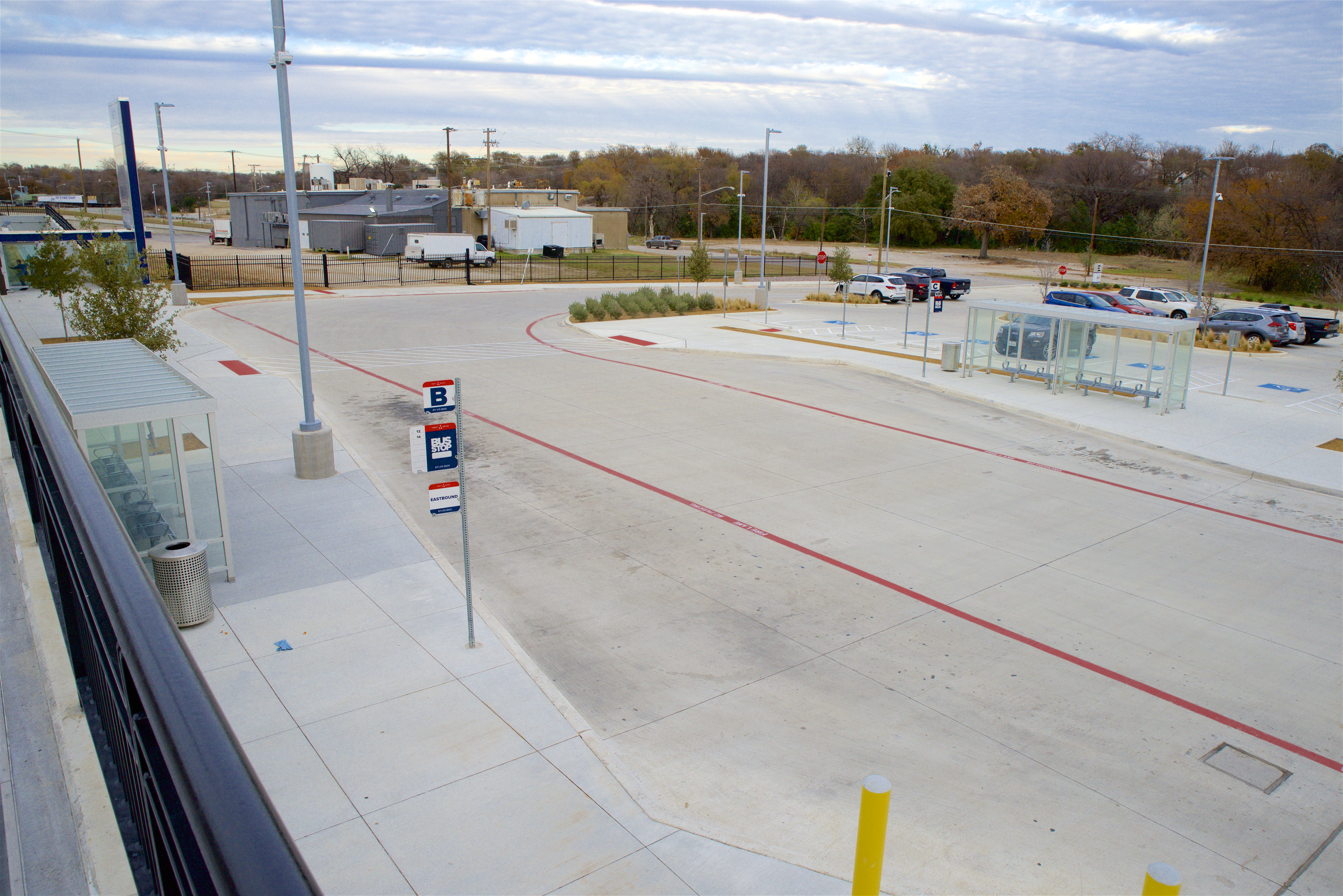
View of bus stops and parking lot from rail platform.

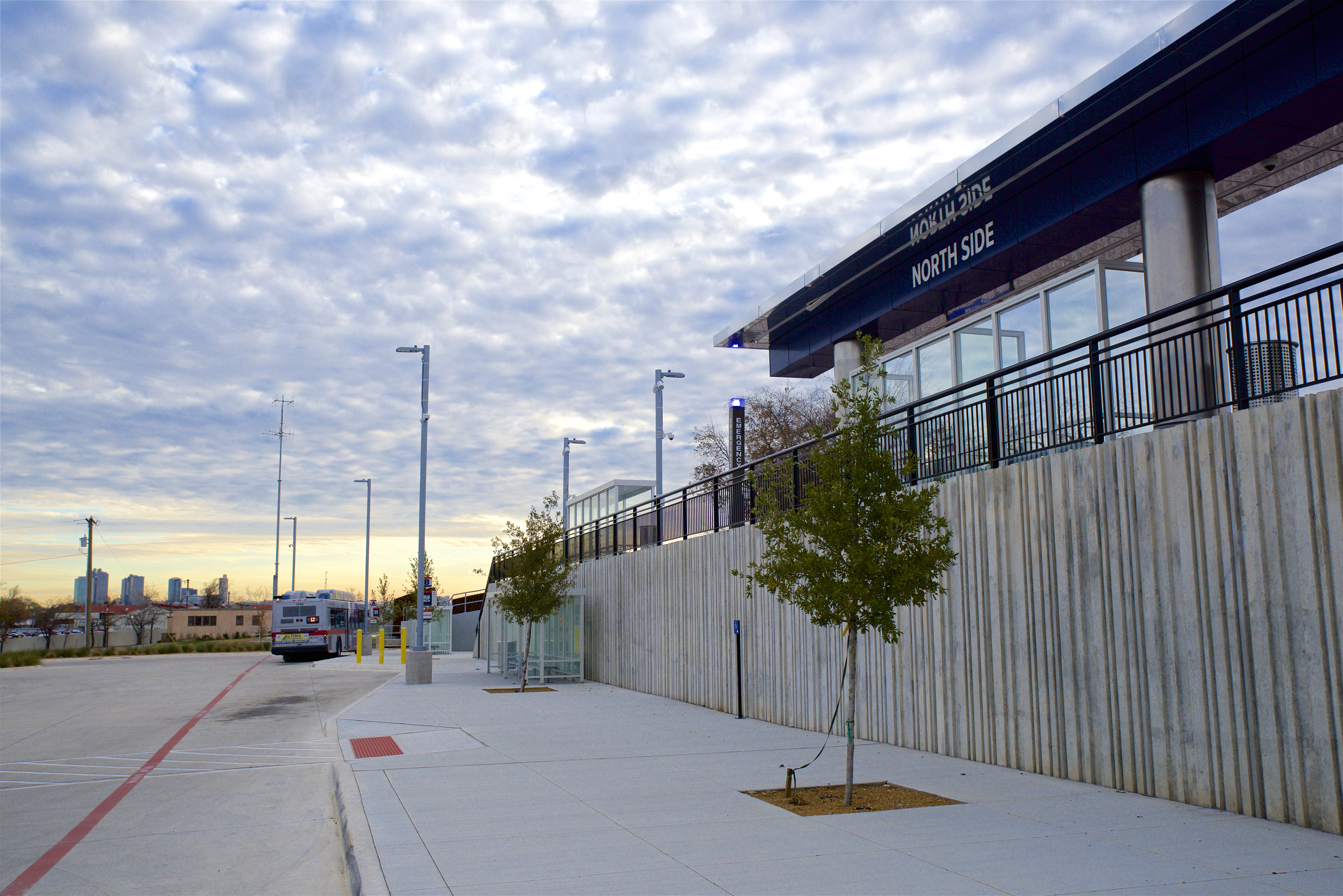
View of rail platform from lower level near bus stops.

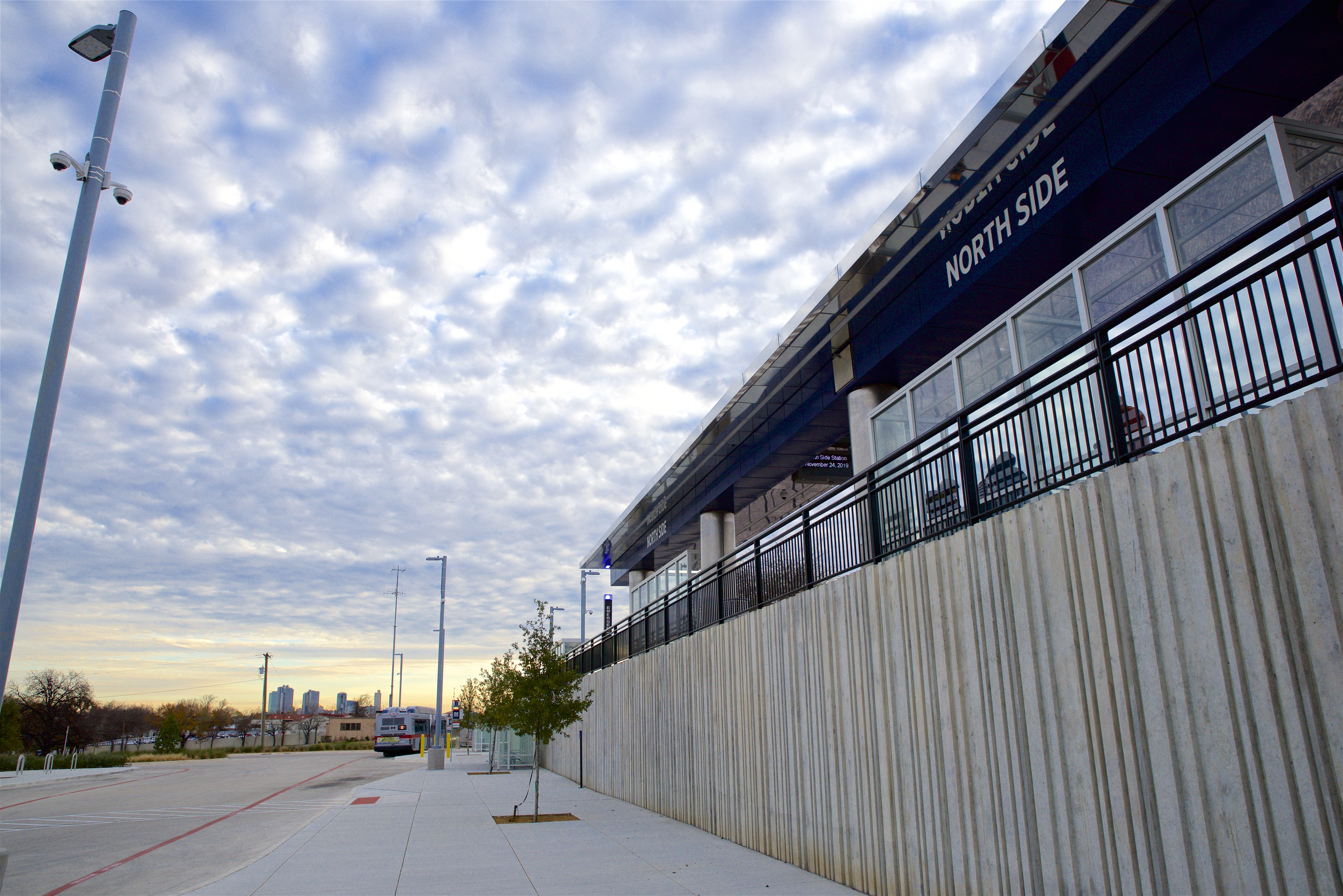
Additional view of rail platform from lower level.
