= Smithfield station =

Smithfield station may refer to:

- Smithfield railway station, a railway station and bus interchange in Adelaide, Australia
- North Richland Hills/Smithfield station, a commuter rail station in Texas, United States
- Selma-Smithfield (Amtrak station), a train station and museum in North Carolina, United States
