= North Richland Hills/Iron Horse station =

North Richland Hills/Iron Horse
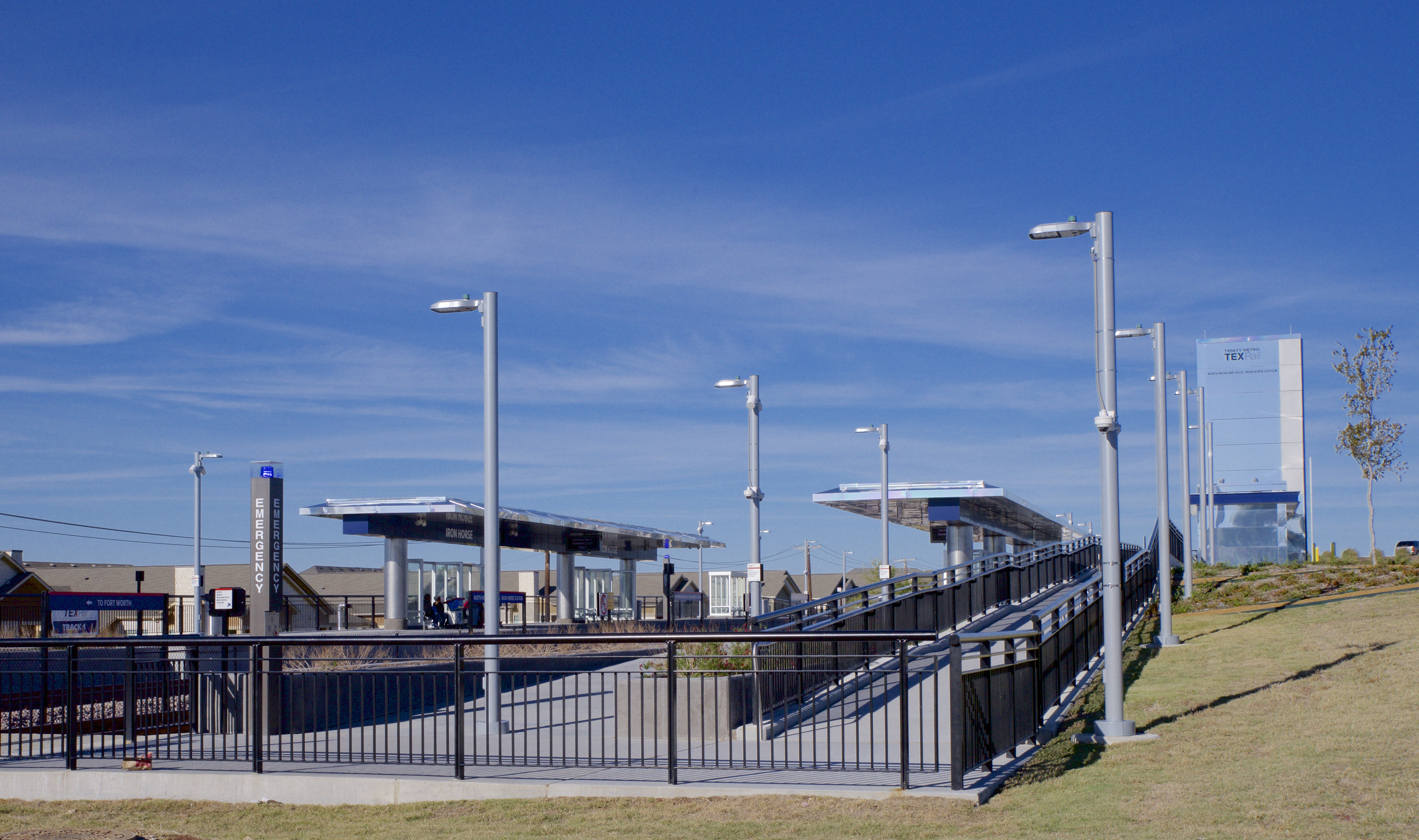
- View of the rail platforms from the southwest.

General information
- Location: 6301 NE 820 Loop; North Richland Hills, Texas 76182
- Coordinates: 32°50′34″N 97°15′04″W
- Owner: Trinity Metro
- Platforms: 2 side platforms

Construction
- Structure type: At-grade
- Parking: 500 spaces
- Accessible: Yes

History
- Opened: December 31, 2018 (preview service); January 10, 2019 (revenue service)

Services
Preceding station	Trinity Metro	Following station
Mercantile Center toward T&P Station	TEXRail	North Richland Hills/Smithfield toward DFW Airport Terminal B
Location

North Richland Hills/Iron Horse station is a TEXRail commuter rail station in North Richland Hills, Texas.

== Services ==
=== TEXRail ===
North Richland Hills/Iron Horse was an opening day station when revenue service began on December 31, 2018. A mixed-use, transit-oriented development, Iron Horse Village, is in the works nearby, which would include up to 469 apartments, office buildings, a commercial area, restaurants, shops, and bakeries. The development would cost $70 million, would be 100 acres large, and the first apartments would be available in the spring of 2017, roughly 1 year before the station's opening.

== Gallery ==
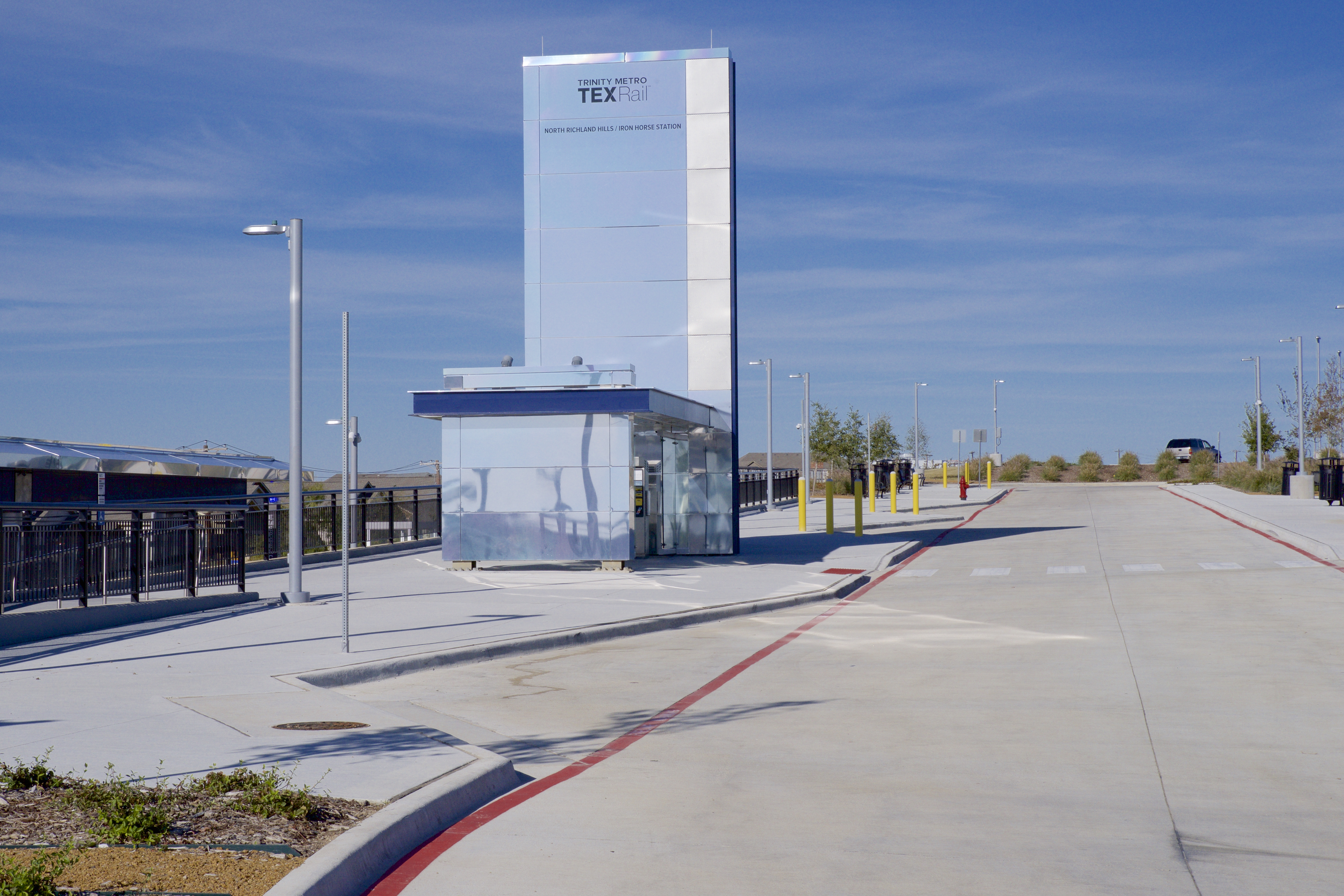
Bus transfer bays adjacent to the rail platform.

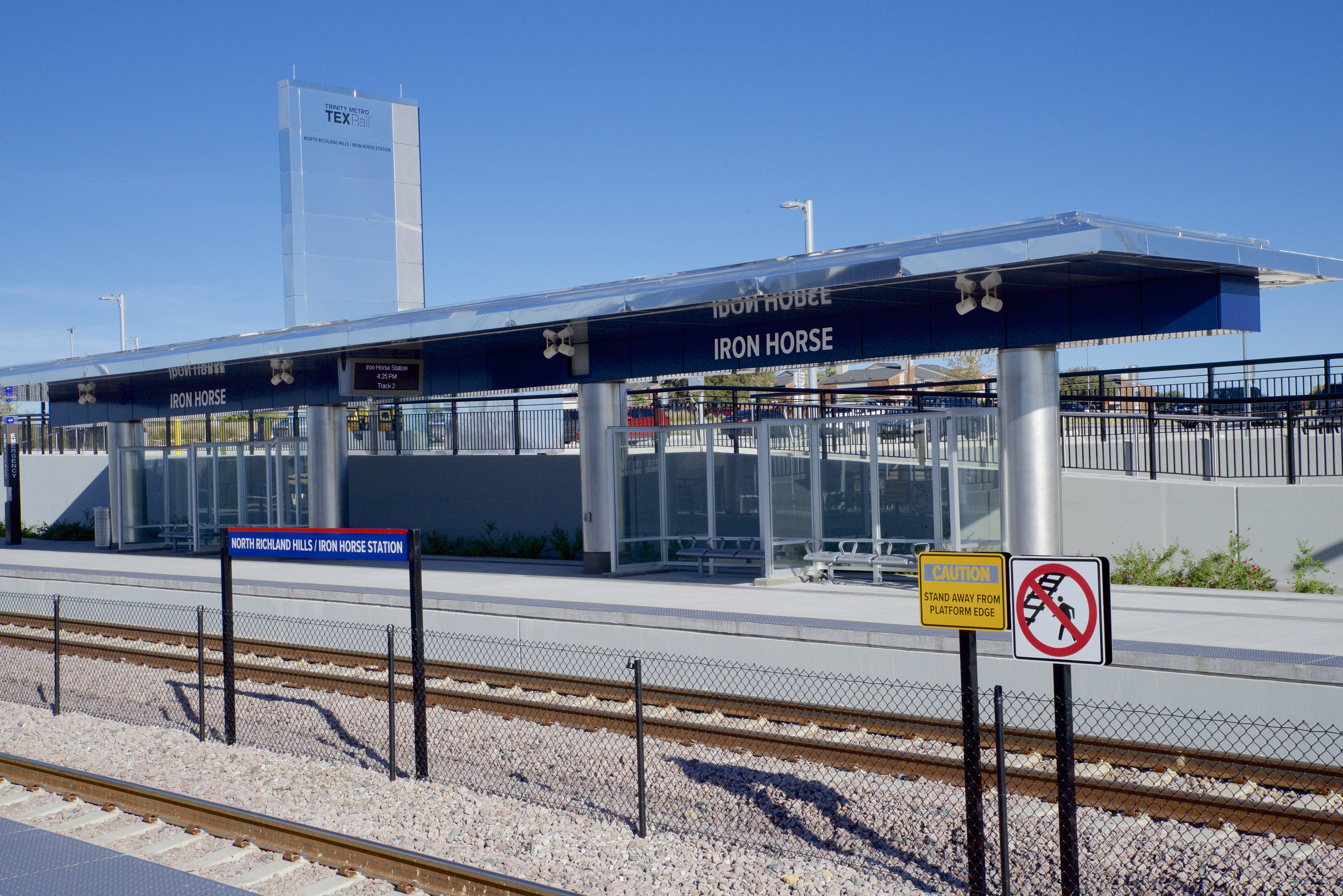
View of eastbound platform from westbound platform.

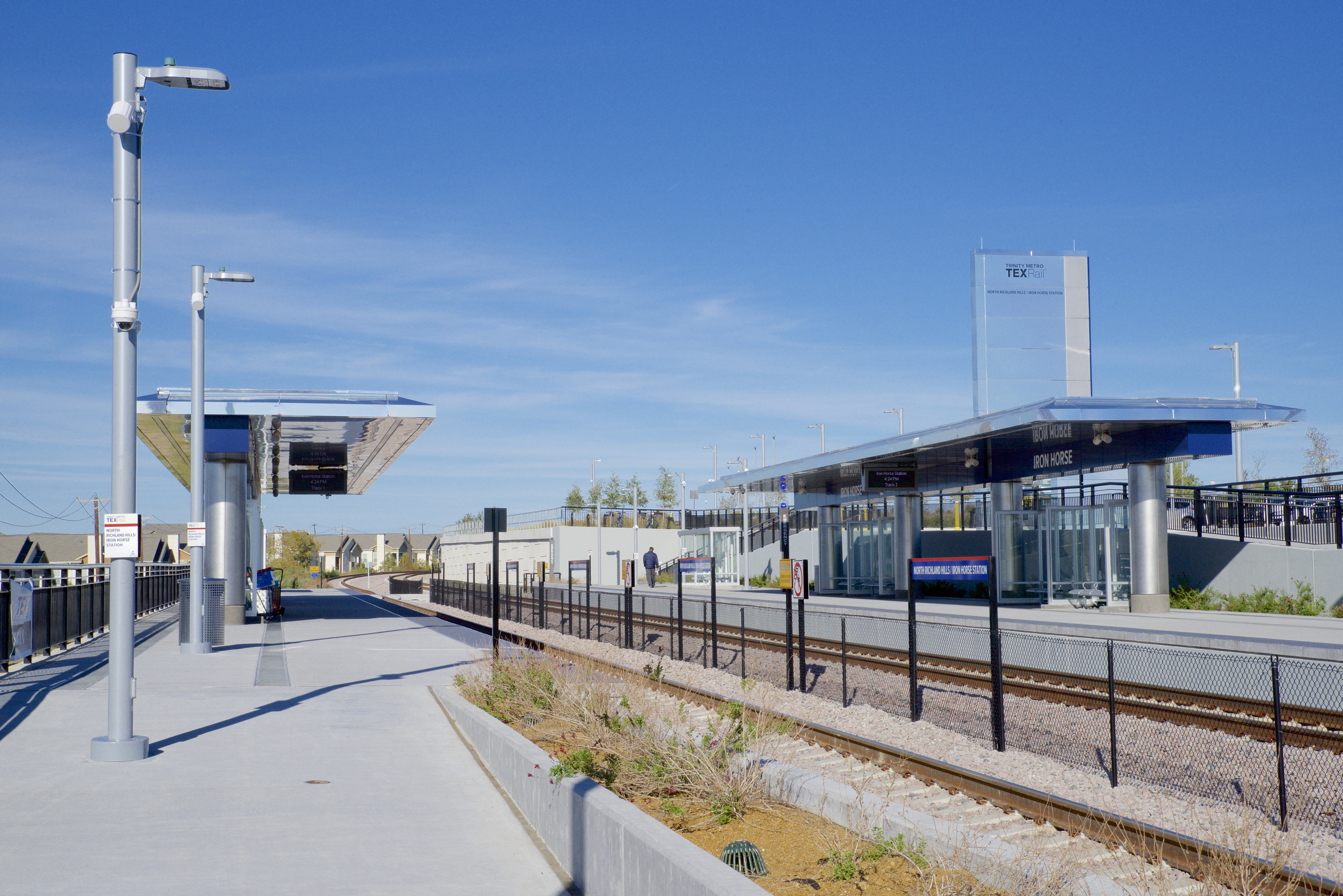
Additional view of rail platforms.

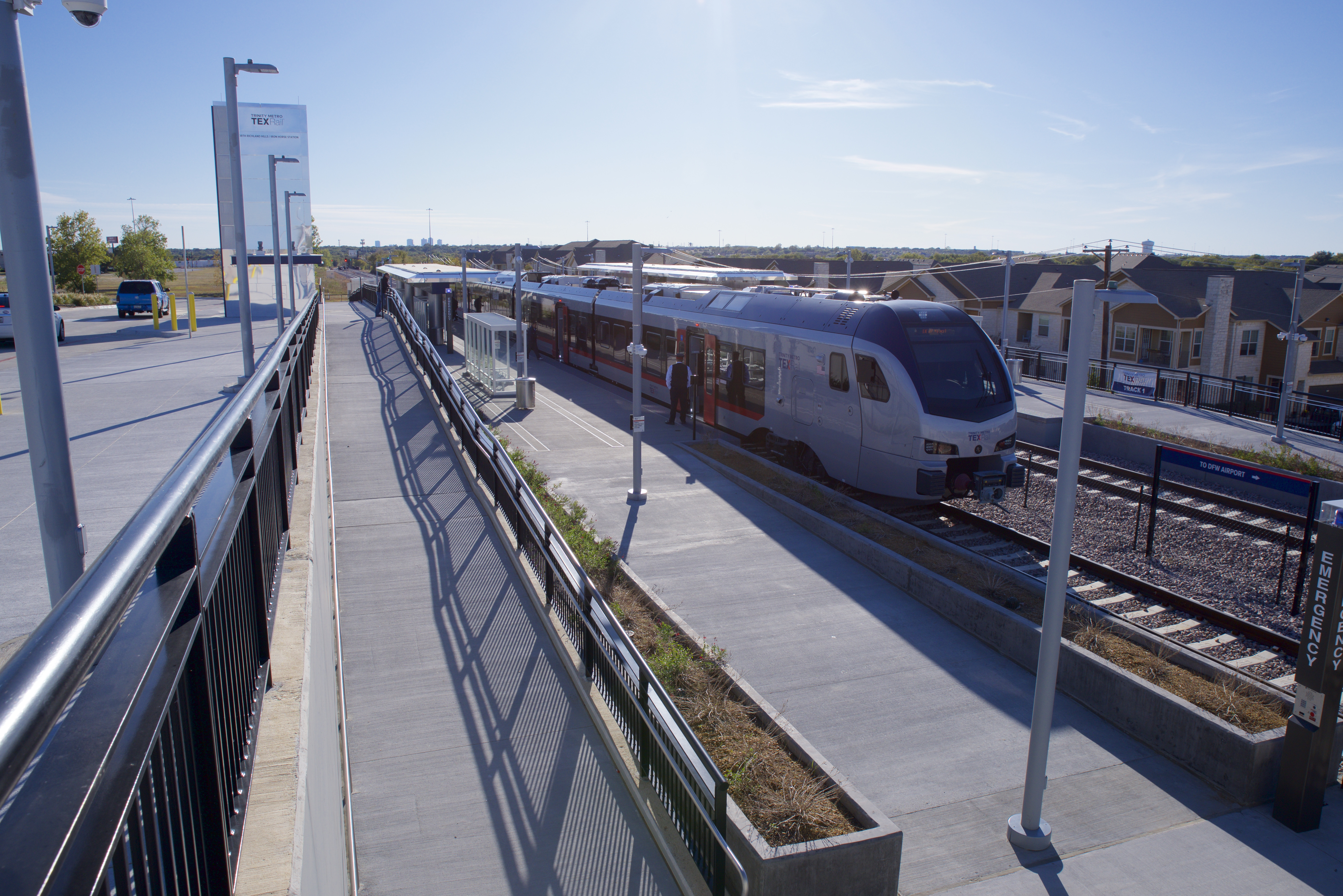
accessible-accessible ramp providing access to rail platforms.
