= CMAQ =

The community multiscale air quality model, or CMAQ, is a sophisticated three-dimensional Eulerian grid chemical transport model developed by the US EPA for studying air pollution from local to hemispheric scales. EPA and state environmental agencies use CMAQ to develop and assess implementation actions needed to attain National Ambient Air Quality Standards (NAAQS) defined under the Clean Air Act. The CMAQ simulates air pollutants of concern—including ozone, particulate matter (PM), and a variety of air toxics — to optimize air quality management. Deposition values from the CMAQ are used to assess ecosystem impacts such as eutrophication and acidification from air pollutants. In addition, the National Weather Service uses the CMAQ to produce twice-daily forecast guidance for ozone air quality across the U.S. The CMAQ unites the modeling of meteorology, emissions, and chemistry to simulate the fate of air pollutants under varying atmospheric conditions. Other kinds of models—including crop management and hydrology models— can be linked with the CMAQ simulations, as needed, to simulate pollution more holistically across environmental media.

The CMAQ is developed and maintained by scientists in the EPA's Office of Research and Development, and new versions of the software are made publicly available through regular public releases.

CMAQ may also refer to the Congestion Mitigation and Air Quality Improvement Program, a program of the United States Department of Transportation.
