= 2019 in rail transport in the United States =

The following are events related to Rail transportation in the United States that happened in 2019.

== Events ==
=== January ===
- (Texas) January 10 – TEXRail commences regular revenue service. A January 4 opening was suspended due to signal issues identified during an inspection less than 12 hours before service was scheduled to begin.
- (California) January 26 – Los Angeles Metro Rail Blue Line Improvements Project begins, which upgrades signalling and infrastructure on large sections of the line with closures of up to eight months. The line resumes normal operation on November 2, but rechristened as the A Line.

=== February ===
- (California) February 11 – After a 15-year hiatus, the BART SFO–Millbrae line restarts weekday operations, reestablishing a one-seat ride between Caltrain and San Francisco International Airport.
- February 25 – Wabtec and GE Transportation are formally merged to become a global leader in railroad manufacturing and specializing in railroad-related services.

=== March ===
- (Illinois) March 2 – All Amtrak California Pacific Surfliner EMD F59PHI units leave from service to Metra in Chicago

=== April ===
- (Arizona) April 25– Phoenix Valley Metro Rail opens an infill station at 50th Street/Washington.
- April 26 – Opening of the FasTracks commuter rail G Line in Denver, Colorado, originally estimated to open in late 2016.

=== May ===
- May 1– Union Pacific 4014 moves under its own steam for the first time in more than 59 years, at Cheyenne, Wyoming.
- May 18– Opening of Valley Metro Rail Gilbert Road Extension in Mesa, Arizona.
- (Colorado) May 19 – Opening of Denver RTD Light Rail Southeast Rail Extension to RidgeGate.

=== June ===
- (North Carolina) June 3 – Charlotte's CityLynx Gold Line ceases operation for upgrades to the line, which include new rolling stock, raised platforms at stops to accommodate level boarding, and extensions to the north and south with 11 new stations. A Rail replacement bus service is offered in the interim.

=== August ===
- (Arizona) August 26 – The Black Mesa and Lake Powell Railroad, one of America's few electric freight railroads, closes.

=== September ===
- (California) September 7 – Altamont Corridor Express begins weekend service.

=== October ===
- October 28–31 – Sonoma–Marin Area Rail Transit services are cancelled on October 28 and 29 due to the preemptive 2019 California power shutoffs affecting crossings throughout the system. Partial service as far north as Downtown Santa Rosa is restored on the 30th and full service resume the following day. Free rides are offered from October 30 until November 6 to provide transportation alternatives following the Kincade Fire.

=== December ===
- (California) December 14 – Sonoma–Marin Area Rail Transit begins revenue service to Larkspur Landing, facilitating a rail-ferry link to San Francisco. Novato Downtown station, an infill station, is opened the same day.
