= TEXRail =

Hybrid rail service in Tarrant County, Texas

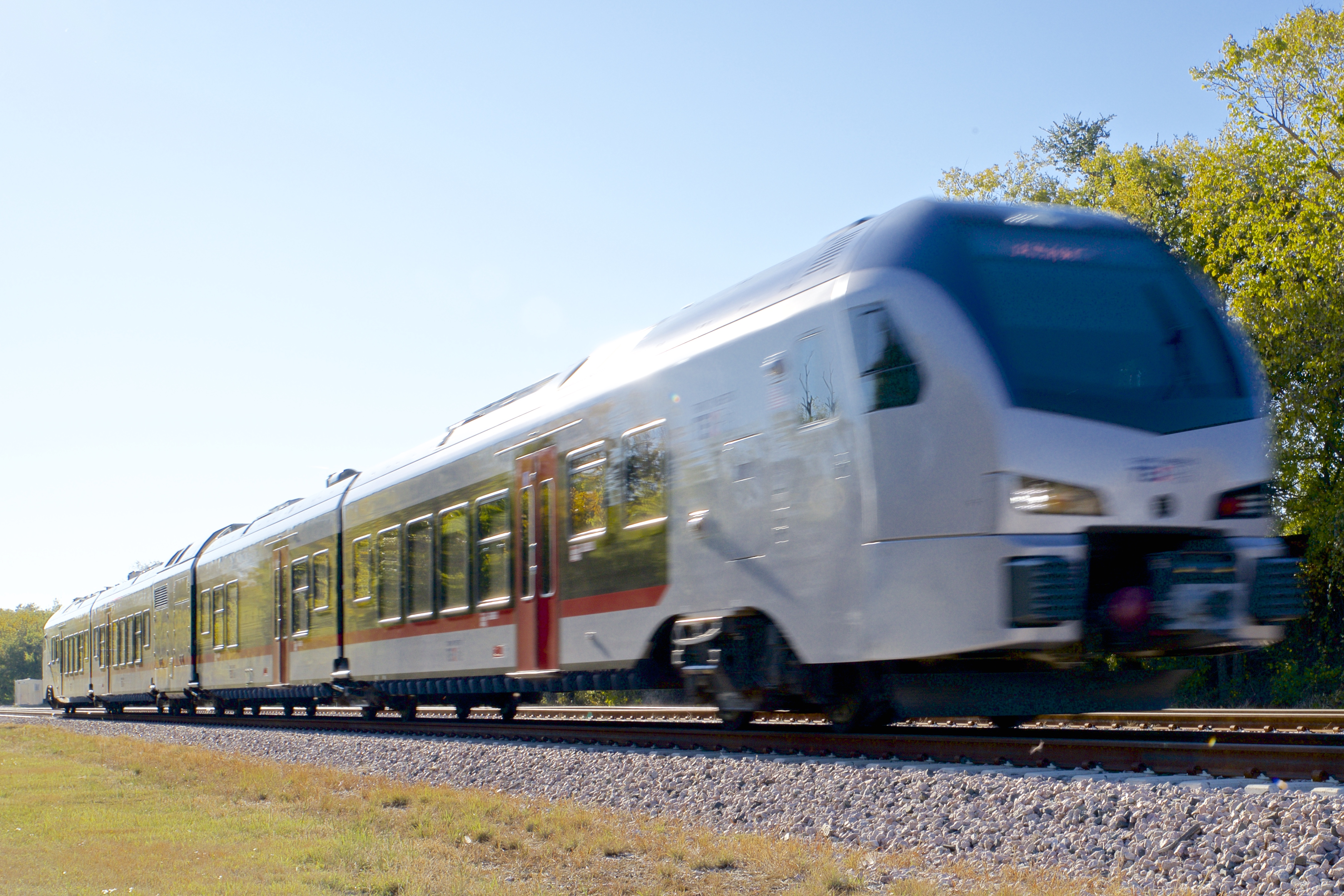

Overview
- Owner: Trinity Metro
- Locale: Tarrant County, Texas, US
- Termini: T&P Station; DFW Airport Terminal B station
- Stations: 9 (1 under construction)
- Website: ridetrinitymetro.org/texrail-schedule

Service
- Type: Hybrid rail
- System: Trinity Metro
- Operator: Herzog Transit Services
- Rolling stock: 8 Stadler FLIRT, (4 on order)
- Daily ridership: 2,800 (weekdays, Q2 2026)
- Ridership: 906,800 (2025)

History
- Opened: December 31, 2018 (preview); January 10, 2019 (full service)

Technical
- Line length: 27.2 mi (43.8 km)
- Track gauge: 4 ft 8 1/2 in (1,435 mm) standard gauge
- Operating speed: 70 mph (110 km/h) top 30 mph (48 km/h) avg.
Route map
TEXRail highlighted in red
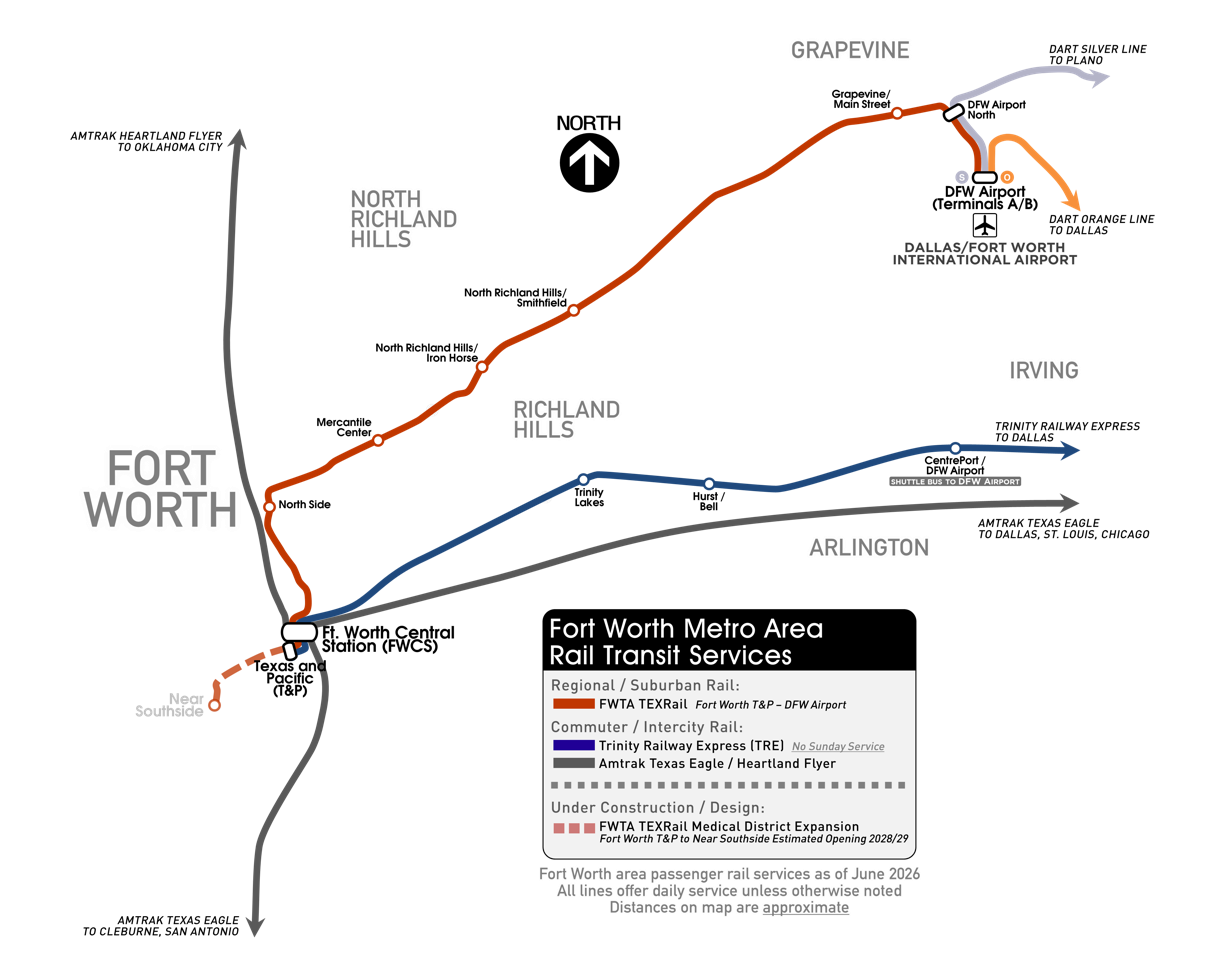

TEXRail is a hybrid rail service in Tarrant County, Texas that provides service between downtown Fort Worth and Dallas/Fort Worth International Airport, with intermediate stations in North Richland Hills and Grapevine. It is operated by Trinity Metro (formerly Fort Worth Transportation Authority). The line was opened for preview service on December 31, 2018 and started revenue service on January 10, 2019. In 2025, the system had a ridership of 906,800, or about 2,800 per weekday.

The new line is worth $1 billion. It is considered a segment of the Cotton Belt Rail Line project, alongside the DART-operated Silver Line to the east.

Officials with Trinity Metro are hoping the new rail line will entice non-member cities along the line to join the transit agency in its quest to become a regional transit entity. Planned TEXRail stations led to agreements with Grapevine and North Richland Hills in 2006 and 2016, respectively, that allowed stations to be built within those cities. The route also passes through Haltom City, Hurst, and Colleyville, but these cities have not joined or signed interlocal agreements, preventing Trinity Metro from building stations in them.

== History ==
Grapevine citizens voted 8,058 to 2,898 on November 7, 2006 to levy a 1-cent sales tax, of which 3/8¢ would authorize Grapevine to contract with Trinity Metro for rail service and another 1/8¢ for other transit improvements, like a downtown parking garage. This includes an expansion of the commuter rail system to link southwest Fort Worth to the north end of DFW International Airport.

Trinity Metro's Board of Directors finalized their plans in October 2006 for the southwest-to-northeast expansion. Two commuter routes, a light rail route and a bus rapid transit route were under consideration. The Board's recommendation was a commuter rail line that runs in the southwest part of the city near Sycamore School Road, running near Texas Christian University and the Medical District on its way to the existing T&P Station and Fort Worth Central station. At that point it turns northwest toward the Stockyards before turning northeast toward DFW International Airport. Preliminary plans call for nine new stations with eleven total, and could be contingent on other cities along the corridor joining the agency.

A proposal to use private funding to construct both TEXRail and DART's Dallas County segment was considered, but this plan was abandoned after necessary legislation was not passed in the State Legislature. Following this legislative defeat, Trinity Metro began pursuing federal grant funds in order to build TEXRail. On March 5, 2014, it was announced that the TEXRail project would receive $50 million in federal grant funds from President Barack Obama's 2015 New Starts Funding Budget.

In April 2015, Trinity Metro approved a contract for pre-construction services, awarded to an Archer Western Contractors/Herzog Contracting Corp (Archer Western Herzog) a joint venture, as well as approving the final design for the Iron Horse and Smithfield Road stations.

On June 9, 2015, Trinity Metro ordered an initial eight 4-car articulated Stadler FLIRTs DMUs. The contract was valued at $106.7 million, with an option for up to 24 additional DMUs, and includes the supply of components for 10 years. This was Switzerland-based Stadler's first order in the US for any model outside its Stadler GTW product line, therefore making it subject to the regulations of the Buy America Act. As such, one element of the contract is that the final assembly of the trains will take place in the US, at their plant in Salt Lake City.

That same month, the Federal Transit Administration (FTA) gave approval for the project to advance into the engineering phase that immediately precedes the start of construction. In June 2016, Trinity Metro received a Letter of No Prejudice from the FTA, essentially green-lighting the project. In reaction to this, Trinity Metro said they planned to start preliminary construction in July 2016, on track for a planned opening date in December 2018. DFW Airport also said they would provide the $40 million to build the station at Terminal B, with an opening date in late 2018.

Construction on the line officially started on August 24, 2016, with a groundbreaking held at Grapevine's historic depot, the site of Grapevine-Main Street station.

On January 4, 2019, less than 12 hours before service was scheduled to commence, the opening was suspended due to signal issues identified during an inspection by Federal Railroad Administration officials along the southern end of the line in Downtown Fort Worth. The new opening took place on January 10, 2019.

== Future expansion ==
Shortly after the line entered service, Trinity Metro and the city of Fort Worth have expressed interest in extending the line south along the existing rail corridor, potentially as far south as the Fort Worth municipal boundary. Areas that would be served by such an extension include Near Southside, Texas Christian University, and a Tarleton State University satellite campus.

The first segment of the extension would stretch 2.1 miles (3.4 km) from T&P Station to the medical district in the Near Southside neighborhood, with a total cost of approximately $167 million. Trinity Metro received two federal grants for the project: a $39 million FTA grant in 2020 and a $25 million RAISE grant in 2025.

On October 29, 2026, Trinity Metro broke ground on the rail extension and the new Near Southside station, with an expected opening date in mid-2030.

== Operations ==
Travel time from T&P Station to DFW International Airport is estimated to be approximately 55 minutes. Trains operate with 30 minute headways between start of service at 4:00am to 7:00pm, after which headways are 60 minutes. Certain trains listed on the Trinity Metro TEXRail schedule do not complete full journeys from FTW to DFW or vice versa.

The line is predominantly single tracked, with passing sidings installed to allow for 30-minute headways.

== Stations ==
Stations were opened on December 31, 2018:

Station	Transfer	Municipality	Parking spaces
T&P Station	Amtrak: Heartland Flyer, Texas Eagle; Trinity Railway Express	Fort Worth	350
Fort Worth Central Station	Amtrak: Heartland Flyer, Texas Eagle; Trinity Railway Express	Fort Worth	–
North Side		Fort Worth	164
Mercantile Center		Fort Worth	318
North Richland Hills/Iron Horse		North Richland Hills	376
North Richland Hills/Smithfield		North Richland Hills	559
Grapevine–Main Street	Grapevine Vintage Railroad	Grapevine	137
DFW Airport North	Silver Line	Grapevine	208
DFW Airport Terminal B	Silver Line; Orange Line (at DFW Airport Terminal A); Trinity Railway Express (via TRE Link bus)	Grapevine	–

== Rolling stock ==
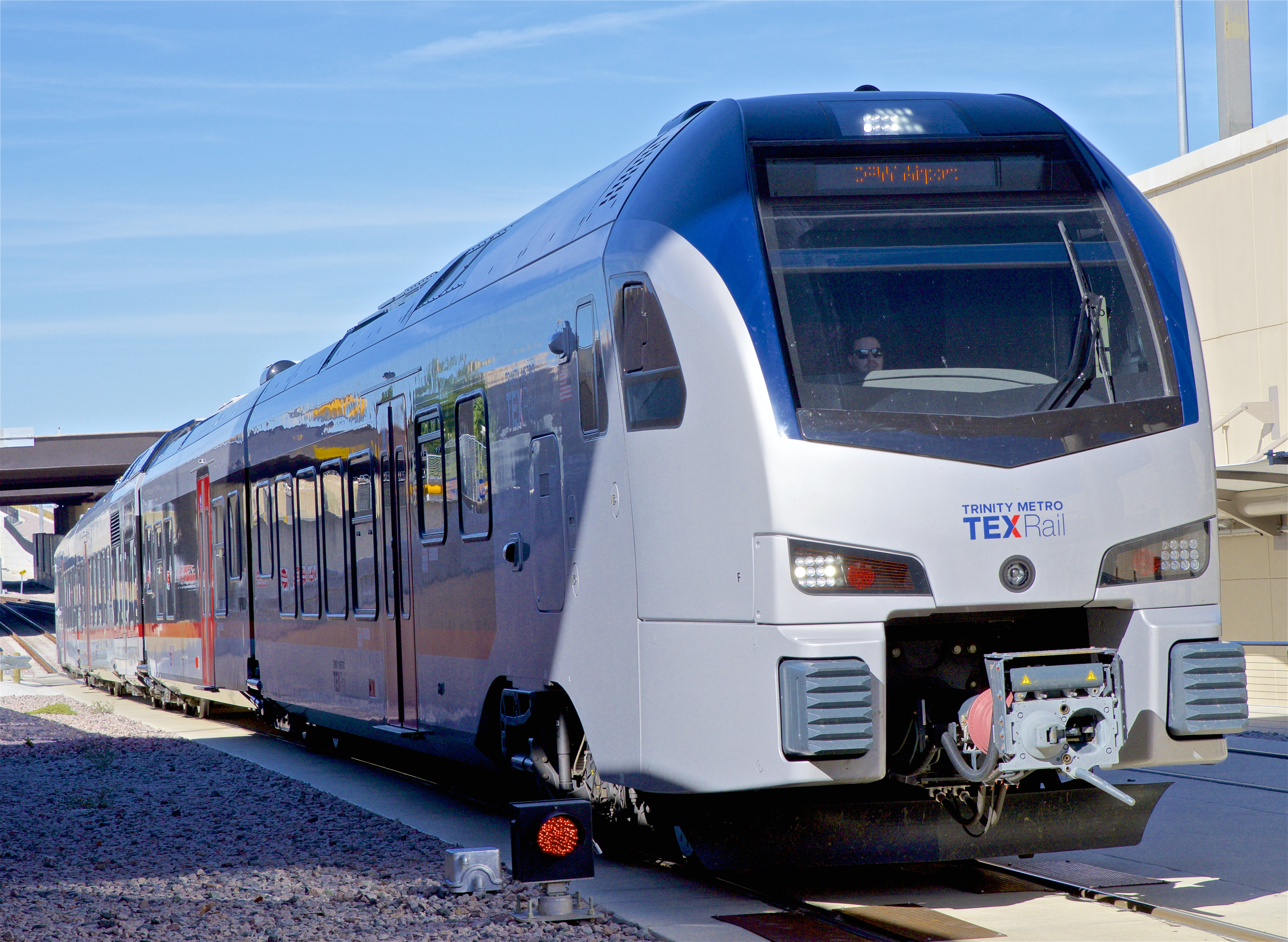
A TEXRail Stadler FLIRT trainset entering DFW Airport Terminal B Station in 2019.

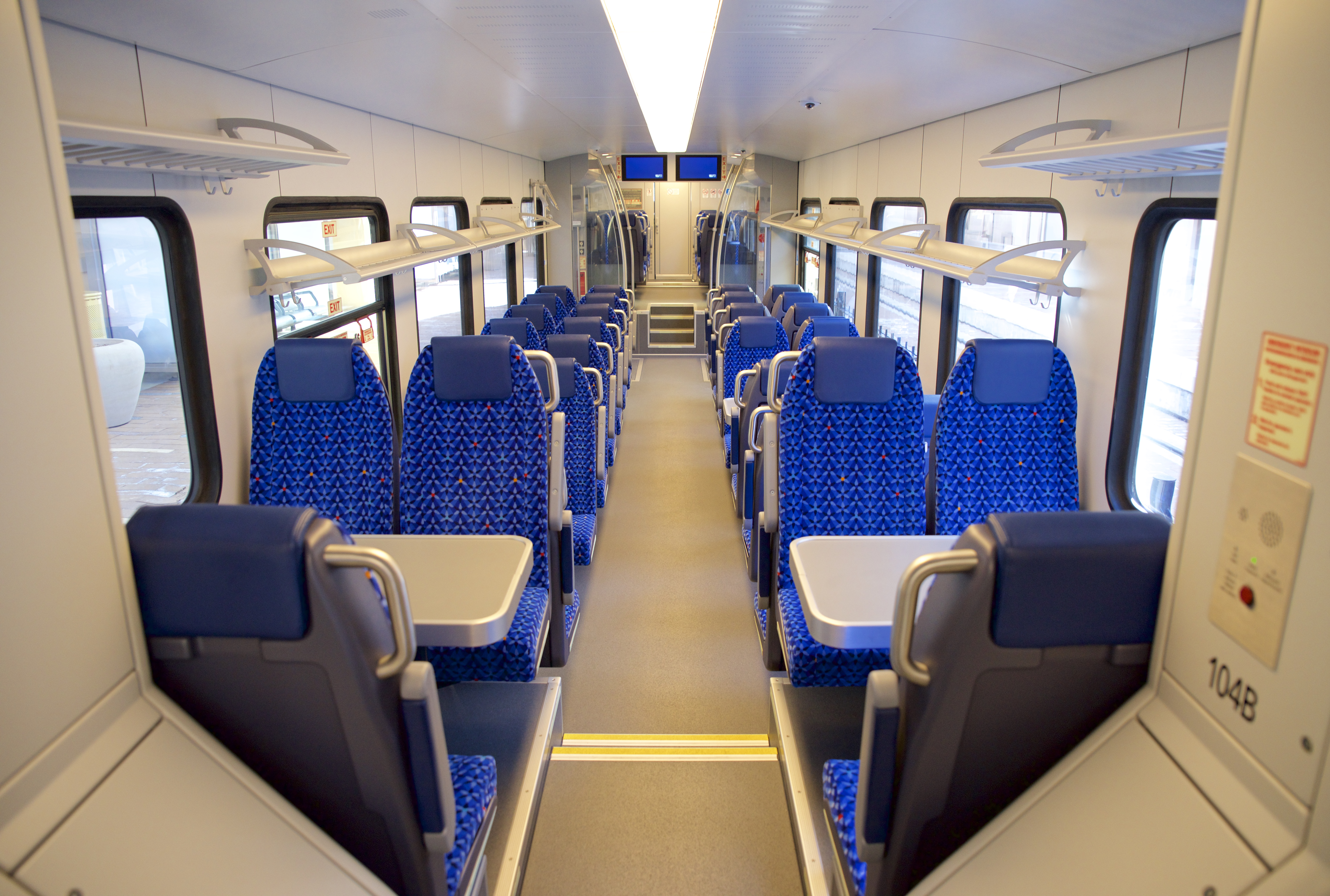
Interior of a TEXRail Stadler FLIRT trainset.

Trinity Metro provides TEXRail service using eight Stadler FLIRT self-propelled diesel multiple units (DMU), TEXRail 101-108, capable of seating 229 passengers and carrying up to 488 passengers. In TEXRail application, the diesel power module contains two 520-kilowatt (697 hp) (1400 hp Total) Deutz AG TCD 16.0 V8 engines that comply with US EPA Tier 4 emission standard, able to achieve a top speed of 81 mph (130 km/h), however mainline track speed is limited to 70 mph. These units at 266 feet (81 m) long weigh in at 352,000 pounds (160 t) empty (443,000 pounds (201 t) full load).

The contract to purchase eight trainsets, valued at about $100 million, was awarded to Stadler in June 2015. The first set was delivered in October 2017, and four more sets had arrived by November 2018. Equipment testing and crew training started in March 2018.

Each rail vehicle is configured with an operator cab at either end for bidirectional movement. At the center of the train is the power pack with two diesel engines, with a passageway to allow access to other parts of the train, and allows it to be much quieter than traditional commuter rail. TEXRail vehicle amenities include USB ports equipped at every seat, work tables, lap trays, a quiet car, ADA compliant level boarding, overhead luggage racks, bike racks, and a restroom near the center of each train.

In 2019, before its delivery to Fort Worth, Stadler used the eighth and final TEXRail vehicle in a ceremony commemorating the 150th anniversary of the golden spike, which marked the completion of the first transcontinental railroad. The vehicle used in the ceremony was nicknamed "Spike", which was emblazoned on the vehicle's front. In 2024, Trinity Metro held a contest to name the other seven TEXRail trains. New train names are:

#	Name
101	Miles
102	Ranger
103	Vaquero
104	Zippy
105	Panther
106	Bluebonnet
107	Maverick
108	Spike

Four additional FLIRT trainsets were ordered from Stadler in late 2024. Delivery is expected in 2027.

== See Also ==
- 2018 in rail transport in the United States
- 2019 in rail transport in the United States
