= 2018 in rail transport in the United States =

The following are events related to rail transportation in the United States that happened in 2018.

== Events ==
=== January ===
- January 13 – Opening of Phase 1 (South Florida) portion of Brightline higher-speed rail in Florida.
- (California) January 19 – The first train of Bay Area Rapid Transit's Fleet of the Future enters revenue service.

=== February ===
- (Illinois) February 5 - Romeoville station opens on the Metra Heritage Corridor line.

=== March ===
- March 13 – Citing infrastructure age and maintenance, Broadmoor, the operator of the Manitou and Pike's Peak Railway, announces that the railway would remain closed for 2018; it is subsequently expected to reopen in 2021 after reconstruction.
- March 16– Opening of the Lynx Blue Line Extension in Charlotte, North Carolina.
- March 21– Florida-based Kirby Family Farm purchases some railroad cars from the now-defunct Ringling Bros. and Barnum & Bailey Corporation.

=== May ===
- May 14 – Burbank Airport–North station opened in Burbank, California, providing additional Metrolink connections to the Hollywood Burbank Airport.
- May 21– GE announces the sale of its railroad manufacturing division GE Transportation to Wabtec.
- (California) May 26 – Opening of Bay Area Rapid Transit's eBART line.

=== June ===
- June 16 – Opening of the Hartford Line, a commuter rail line between New Haven, Connecticut and Springfield, Massachusetts via Hartford, Connecticut.

=== July ===
- July 30 – Opening of SunRail Phase 2 South extension to Poinciana, Florida.

=== November ===
- (Wisconsin) November 2 – Opening of The Hop (Milwaukee Streetcar).
- (Texas) November 9 – Opening of the El Paso Streetcar.
- November 16
  - Opening of the Delmar Loop Trolley in St. Louis and University City, Missouri.
  - (Florida) Brightline announced it would be rebranding as Virgin Trains USA, with the Virgin Group taking a minority shareholding.

=== December ===
- December 14 – Opening of the Oklahoma City Streetcar in Oklahoma City, Oklahoma.
- (Texas) December 31 – TEXRail carries officials and partners for its maiden preview service.
