= North Richland Hills/Smithfield station =

Commuter rail station in Texas

North Richland Hills/Smithfield
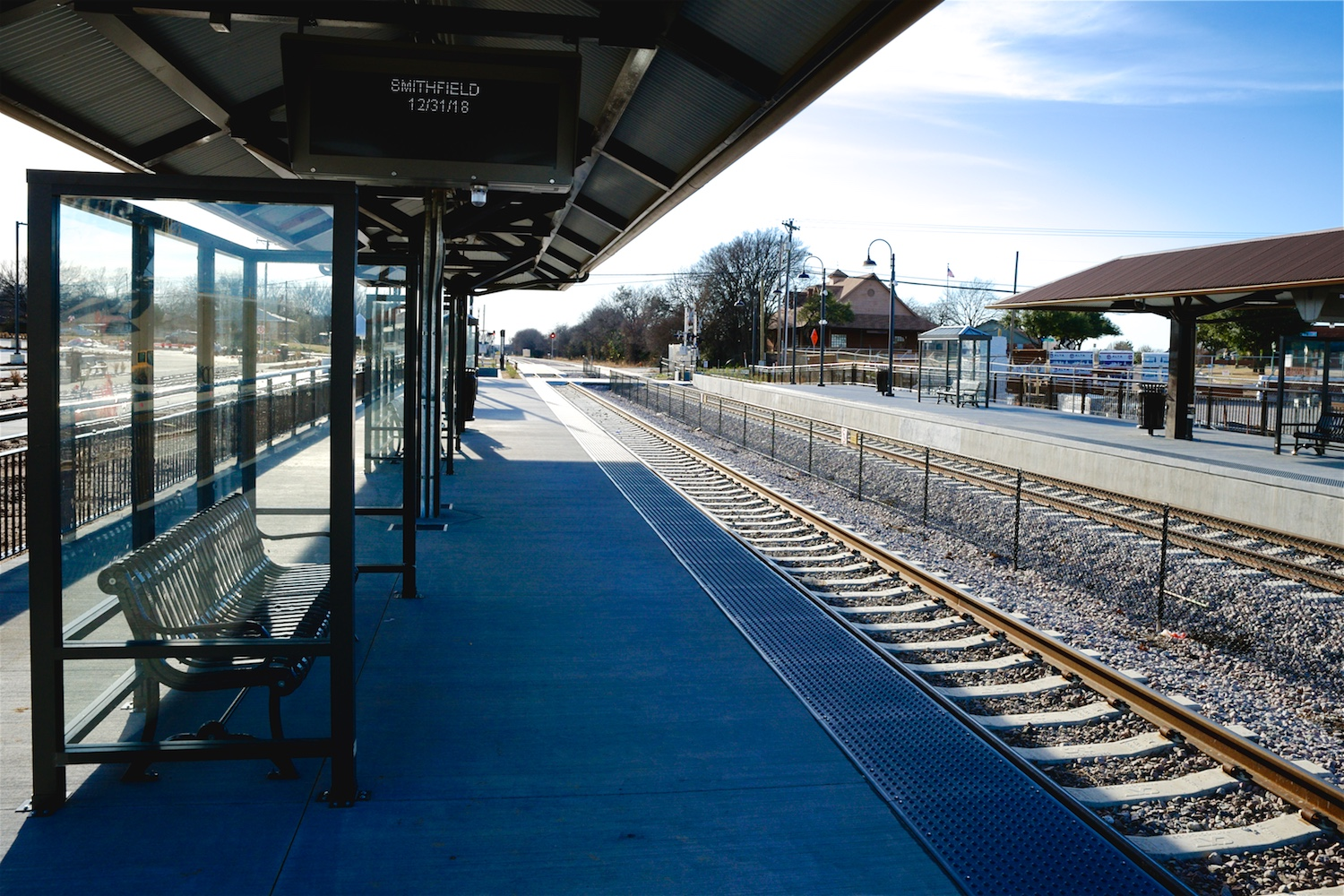
- Facing west from the platform.

General information
- Location: 6416 Smithfield Road; North Richland Hills, Texas 76182
- Coordinates: 32°51′51″N 97°12′42″W
- Owner: Trinity Metro
- Platforms: 2 side platforms

Construction
- Structure type: At-grade
- Parking: 559 spaces
- Accessible: Yes

History
- Opened: December 31, 2018 (preview service); January 10, 2019 (revenue service)

Services
Preceding station	Trinity Metro	Following station
North Richland Hills/Iron Horse toward T&P Station	TEXRail	Grapevine/Main Street toward DFW Airport Terminal B
Location

North Richland Hills/Smithfield station is a TEXRail commuter rail station in North Richland Hills, Texas.

== Services ==
=== TEXRail ===
North Richland Hills/Smithfield was an opening day station when revenue service began on December 31, 2018. North Richland Hills councilman Tom Lombard compared the TEXRail station to the 1989 opening of the nearby Iron Horse Golf Course, adding that it would be "a big, big game-changer for us". The station were included 562 spaces of parking when were opened.

== Gallery ==
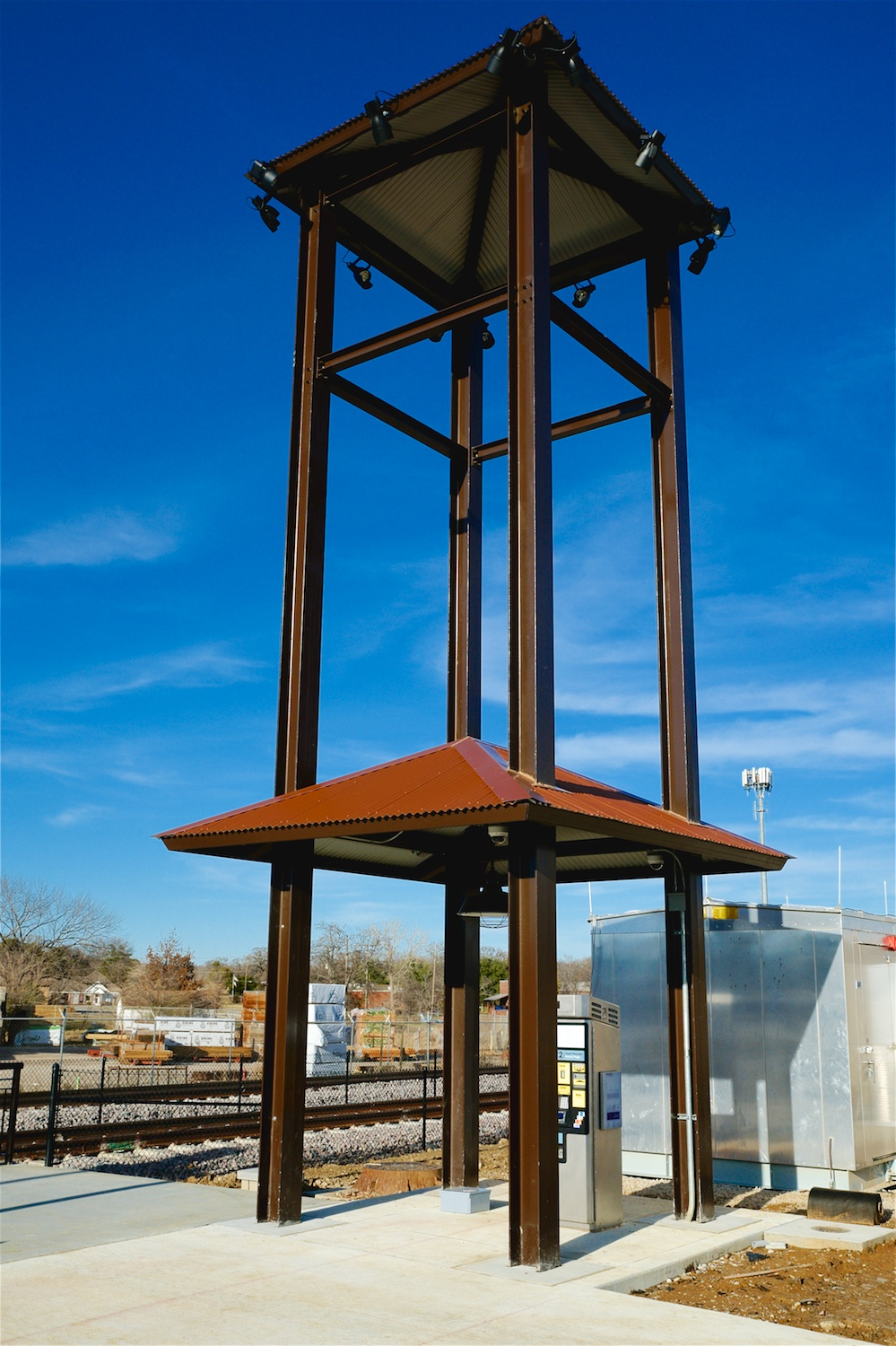
Decorative tower closeup.

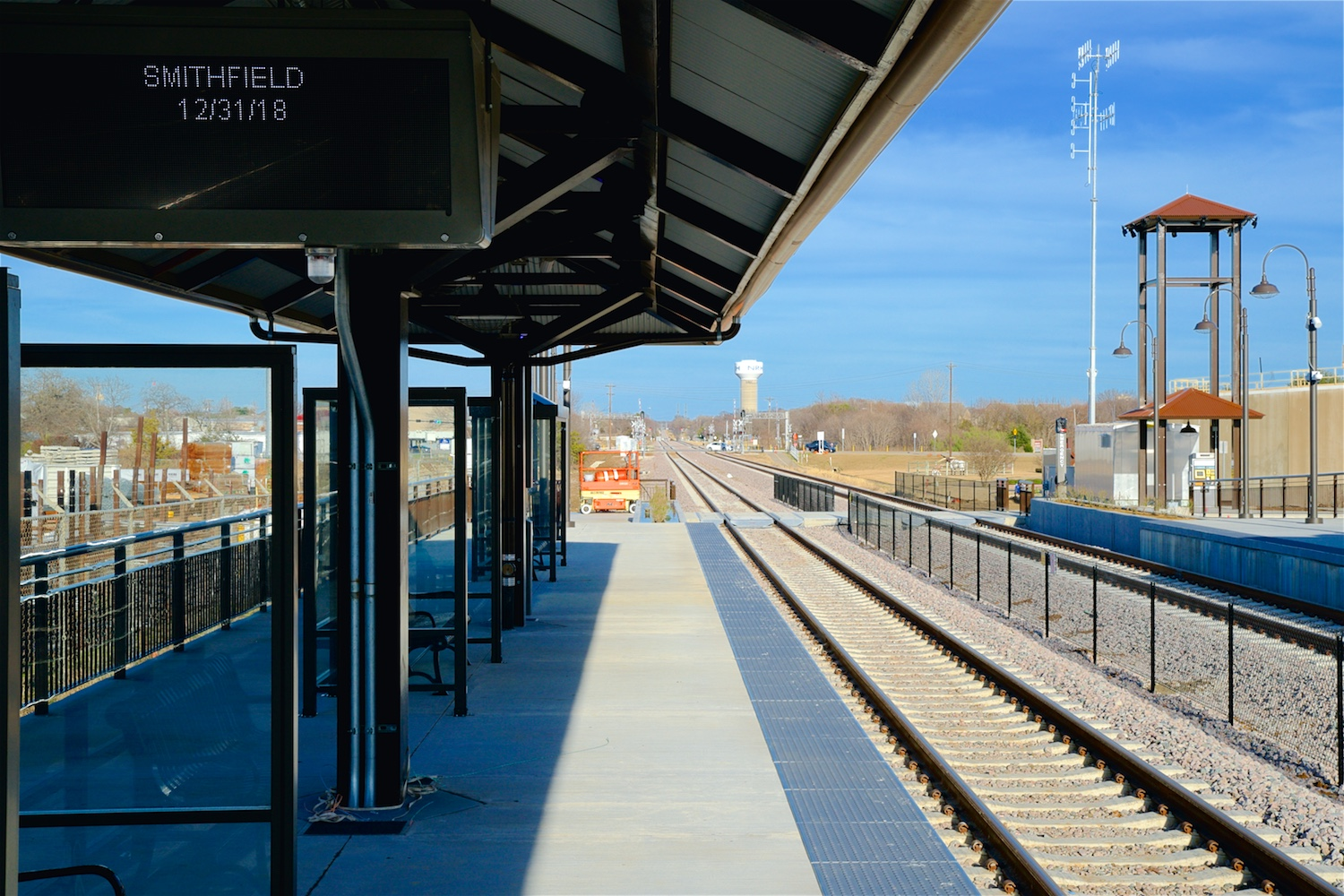
View east from the platform.

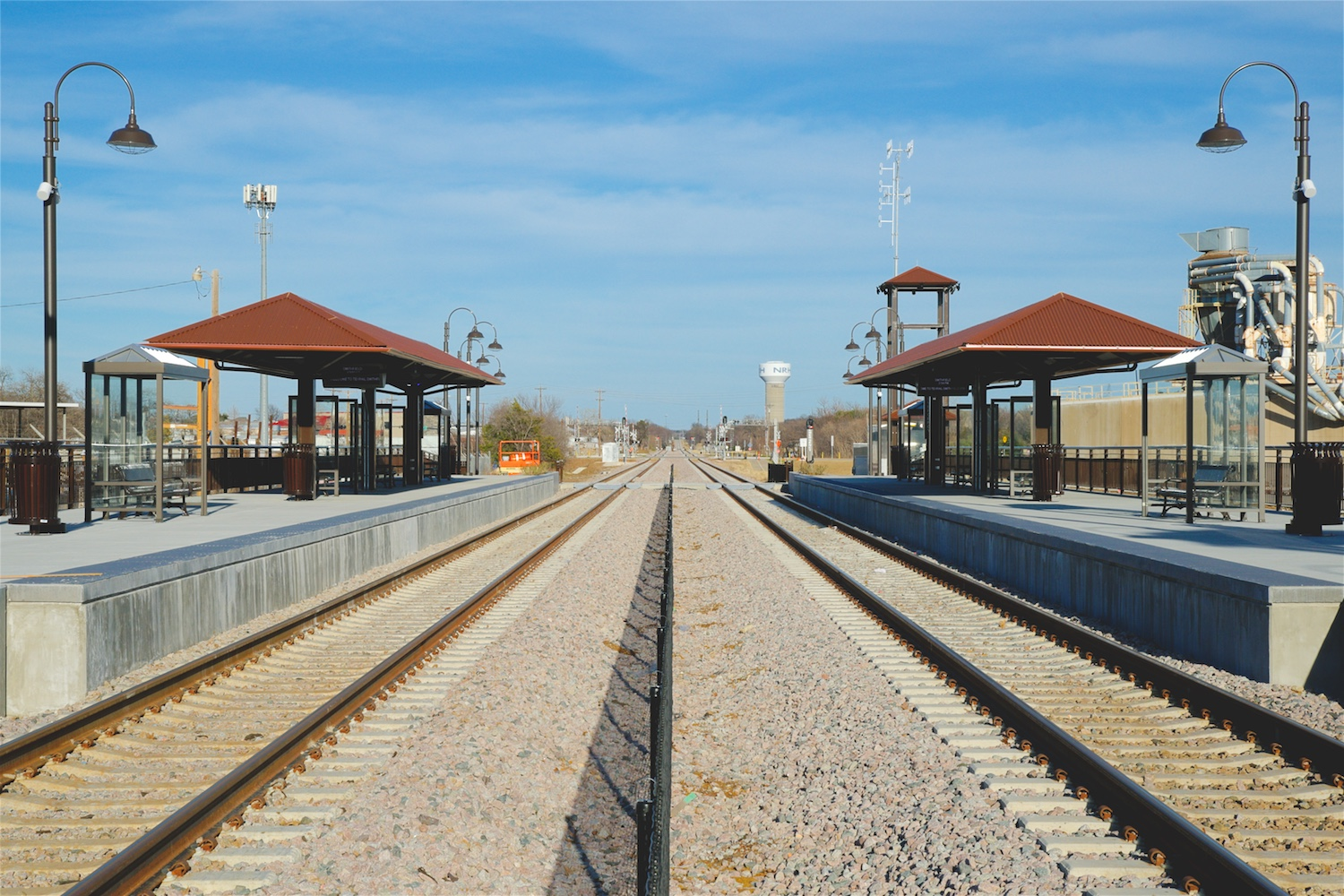
View of platforms, facing east.
