= Congestion Mitigation and Air Quality Improvement Program =

The Congestion Mitigation and Air Quality Improvement (CMAQ) program is an initiative established by the United States Department of Transportation to provide flexible funding—at local and state levels—for transportation projects which reduce emissions and improve air quality. A focus is on areas which violate National Ambient Air Quality Standards, including reducing traffic congestion and pollutants such as ozone, carbon monoxide and particulate.
