= Alliance, Texas =

Planned community in the United States

AllianceTexas
- Planned community
- Logo
- Interactive map of AllianceTexas
- Coordinates: 33°0′0.6984″N 97°17′35.5236″W
- Country: United States
- State: Texas
- County: Tarrant

Government
  - Type: Multiple HOAs

Area
  - Total: 26.56 sq mi (68.8 km^{2})
  - Land: 26.56 sq mi (68.8 km^{2})
  - Water: 0 sq mi (0.0 km^{2})
- Elevation: 751 ft (229 m)
- Time zone: UTC-6 (Central (CST))
  - Summer (DST): UTC-5 (CDT)
- ZIP code: 76244
- Area codes: 682, 817, 940
- Website: alliancetexas.com

Alliance is a planned community located within Denton and Tarrant counties, Texas, United States. It includes parts of the cities of Haslet, Fort Worth, Westlake, Northlake, Denton, and Roanoke. It is developed by Hillwood, a Henry Ross Perot, Jr. company.

== Business ==
Alliance, Texas is home to the branches of more than 500 companies, of which 69 were Fortune 500 corporations as of December 2018. Total private investment, as of December 2018, is $9,036,738,025, with total public investment totaling $775,380,929. Alliance companies employ 61,602 people of various positions.

== Residential ==
Alliance, Texas contains seven major developments: Heritage, Saratoga, Harvest, Chisholm Ridge, Creekwood, Park Glen, and Pecan Square. There are over 10,000 single-family homes located within these communities, plus 2,100 apartment units and 200 hotel rooms, all of which are located near the town center, Cabela's, and the Texas Motor Speedway.

== Transportation ==
Alliance, Texas is served by a logistics hub, including the BNSF Railway's Alliance Intermodal Rail Hub and Fort Worth Alliance Airport for rail and air cargo. Interstate 35W, Alliance Gateway Freeway, U.S. Route 377, Texas Highway 114, Texas Highway 170, and Texas Farm to Market Road 156 all run through the community.
