= DFW Airport Terminal B station =

Commuter rail station at Dallas/Fort Worth International Airport

DFW Airport Terminal B
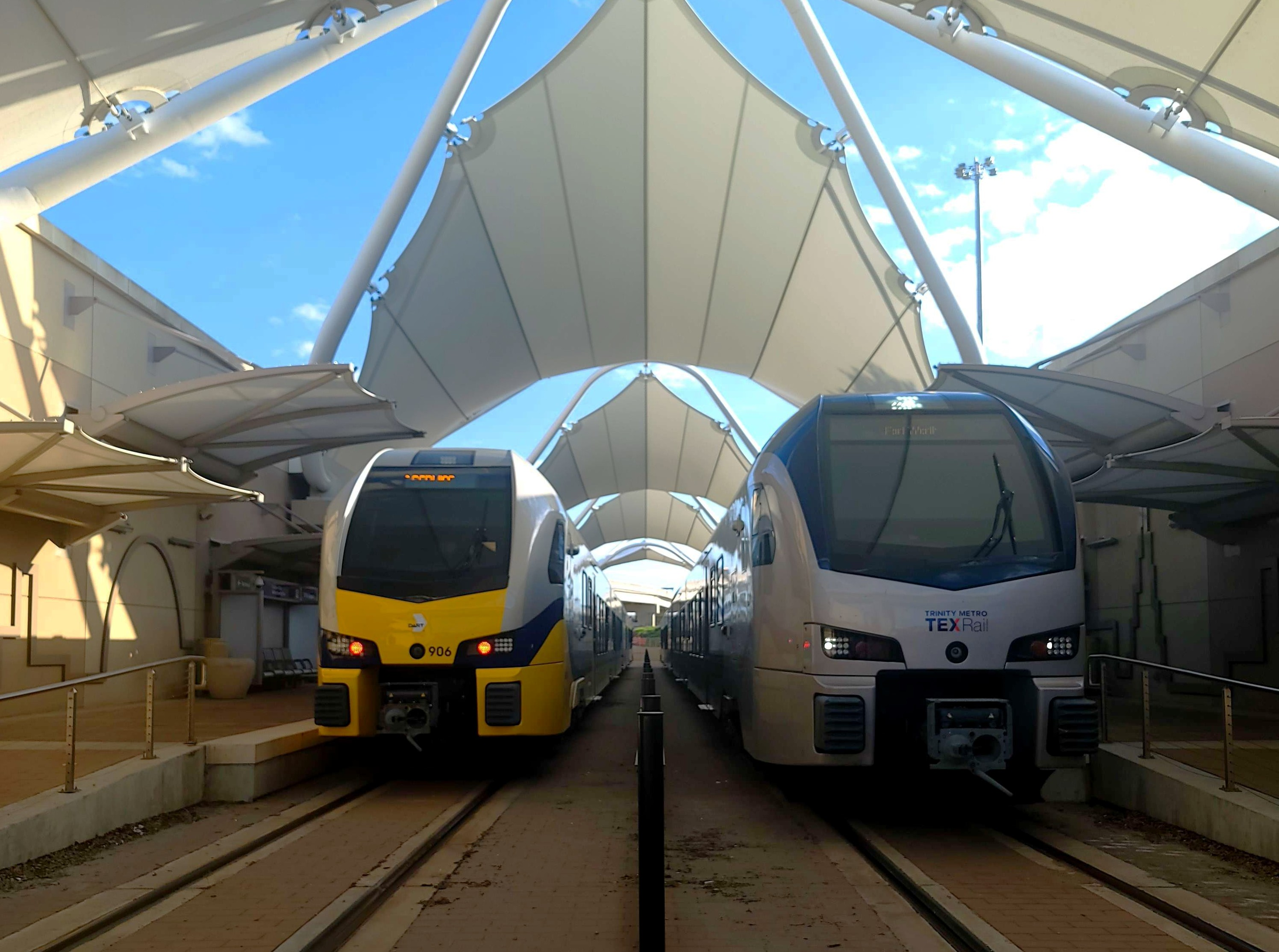
- DART Silver Line (left) and TEXRail (right) at DFW Airport Terminal B station, October 2025

General information
- Location: South Service Road; DFW Airport, Texas
- Coordinates: 32.906909°N 97.041193°W
- Owner: Dallas Fort Worth International Airport
- Operator: Trinity Metro
- Platforms: 2 side platforms
- Tracks: 2
- Connections: Orange Line at Terminal A; Skylink (post-security); DFW Terminal Link; Trinity Metro: 31 (TRE Link); FlixBus

Construction
- Structure type: At-grade
- Accessible: Yes

History
- Opened: January 10, 2019

Passengers
- May 2025: 21,300 (avg. monthly) ▲12.7% (TEXRail)

Services
Preceding station	Trinity Metro	Following station
DFW Airport North toward T&P Station	TEXRail	Terminus
Preceding station	DART	Following station
DFW Airport North toward Shiloh Road	Silver Line	Terminus
Location

DFW Airport Terminal B station is a commuter rail station at Dallas Fort Worth International Airport. The station serves as the eastern terminus of Trinity Metro's TEXRail service, which connects the airport to Grapevine, North Richland Hills, and Fort Worth. It also serves as the western terminus of Dallas Area Rapid Transit's Silver Line, which connects the airport to northern Dallas, Carrollton, Addison, Richardson, and Plano.

Pedestrian walkways connect the station to the lower level of Terminal B and the DFW Airport Terminal A light rail station, which serves the Orange Line. TRE Link, a shuttle bus to the Trinity Railway Express line, can be accessed from Terminal B. Additionally, the walkway between the Terminal A and Terminal B stations is used as a FlixBus station.

Terminals C, D, and E can be accessed both landside (via DFW's Terminal Link shuttle) or airside (via the Skylink people mover) from Terminal B's upper level.

As of May 2025, the station is the most-used on the TEXRail line, with approximately 21,300 riders per month.

== History ==
Original plans for the Cotton Belt Rail Corridor, which eventually became TEXRail and the Silver Line, did not call for a direct connection to the airport. Instead, both services would terminate at DFW Airport North, a small park-and-ride closer to the rail corridor, which would then require a transfer to the Orange Line (or, in one proposal, an extension of the airport's Skylink people mover) for terminal access. However, the Orange Line extension required by this design was rendered infeasible due to expansions of SH 114 and SH 121, so the rail corridor was instead extended south to a new station at Terminal B.

The station was designed and constructed by the airport at an estimated $28.4 million cost. Construction required the demolition of a guideway used by the airport's now-defunct Airtrans system. Both TEXRail and the Terminal B station entered revenue service on January 10, 2019.

When the corridor into the airport was constructed, it was built with two tracks: one for use by TEXRail, and one for use by the Silver Line. Silver Line service began on October 25, 2025.

== Gallery ==
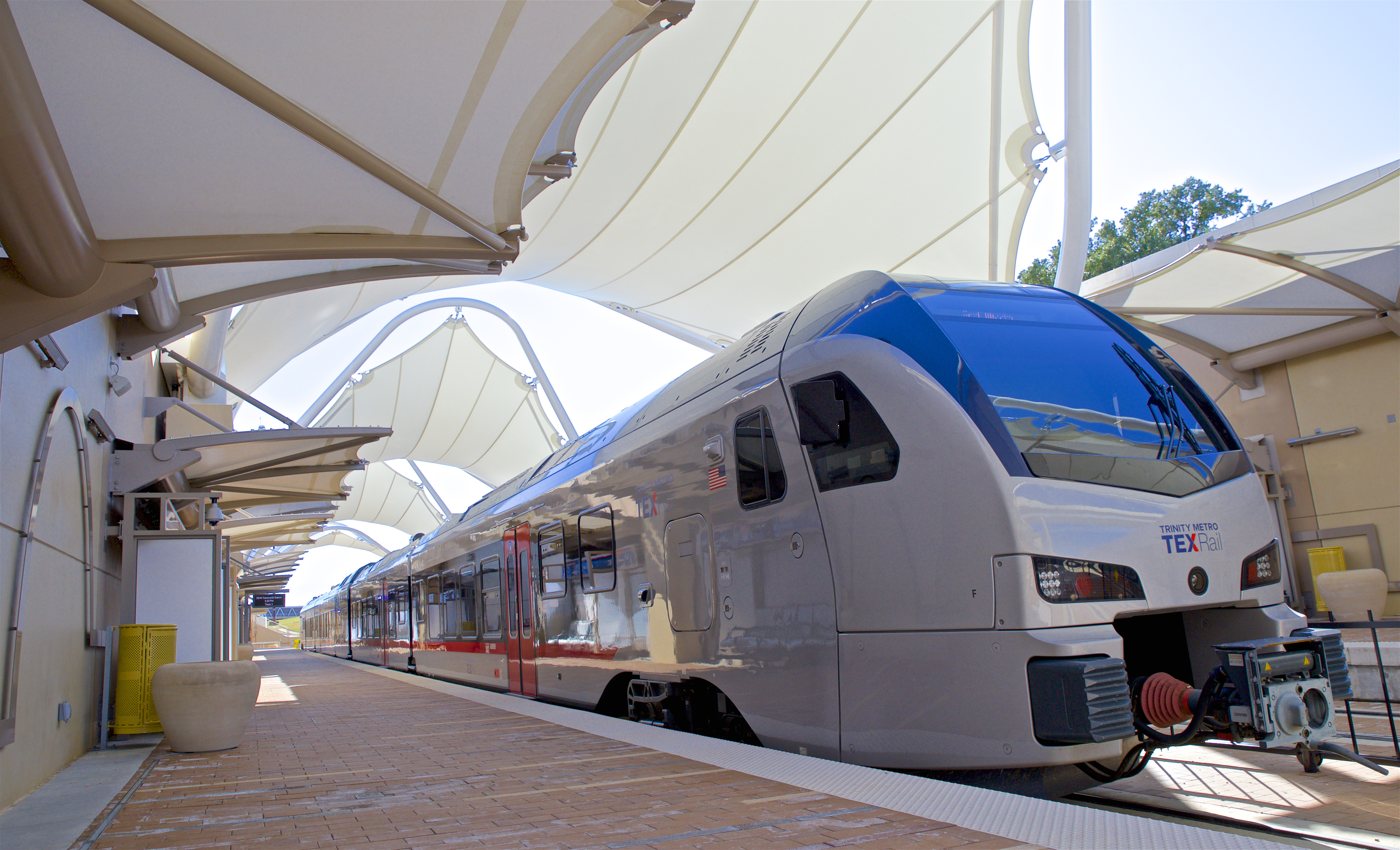
TEXRail Stadler FLIRT waiting on the platform

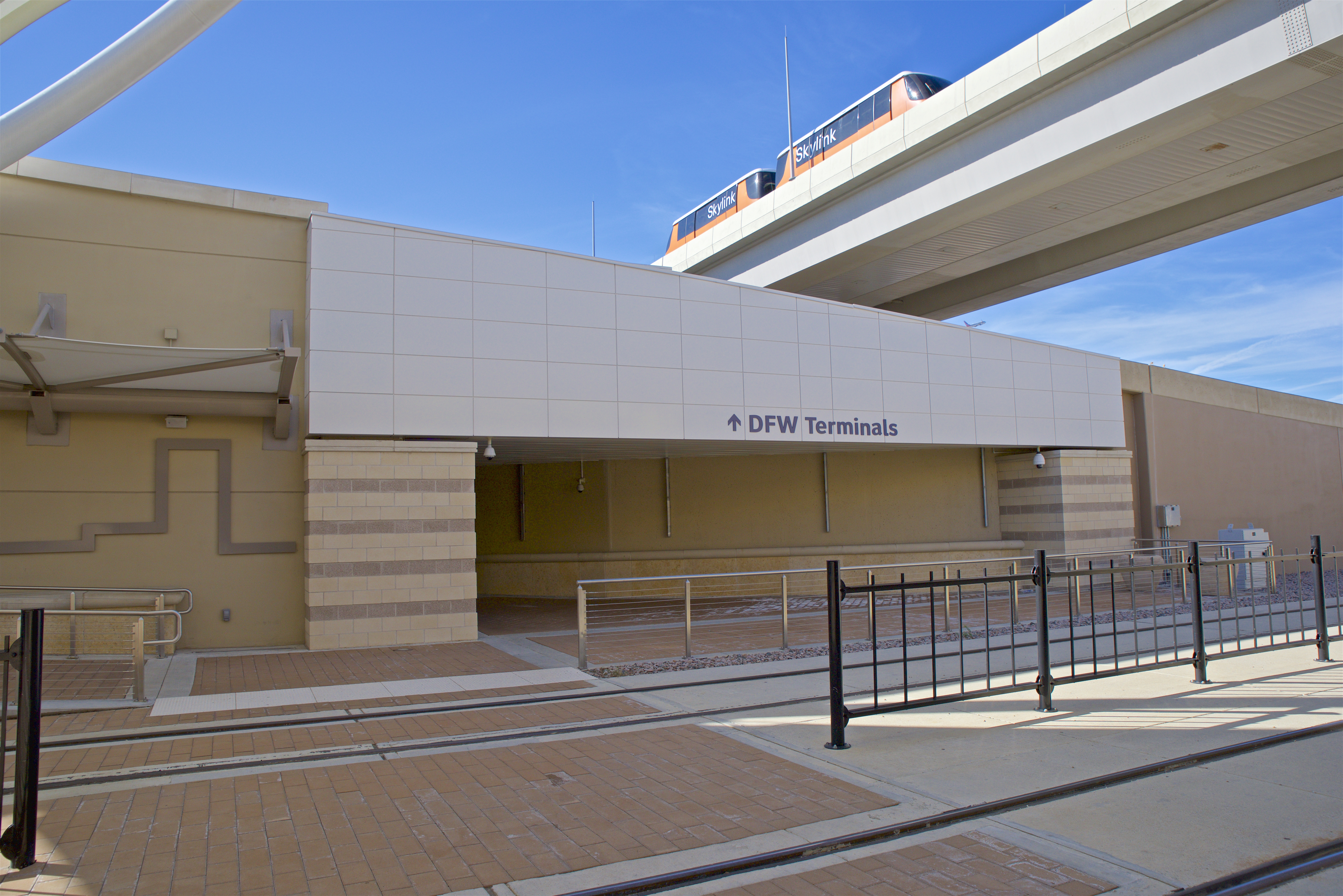
Pedestrian entrance to Terminal B, with Skylink overpass in background

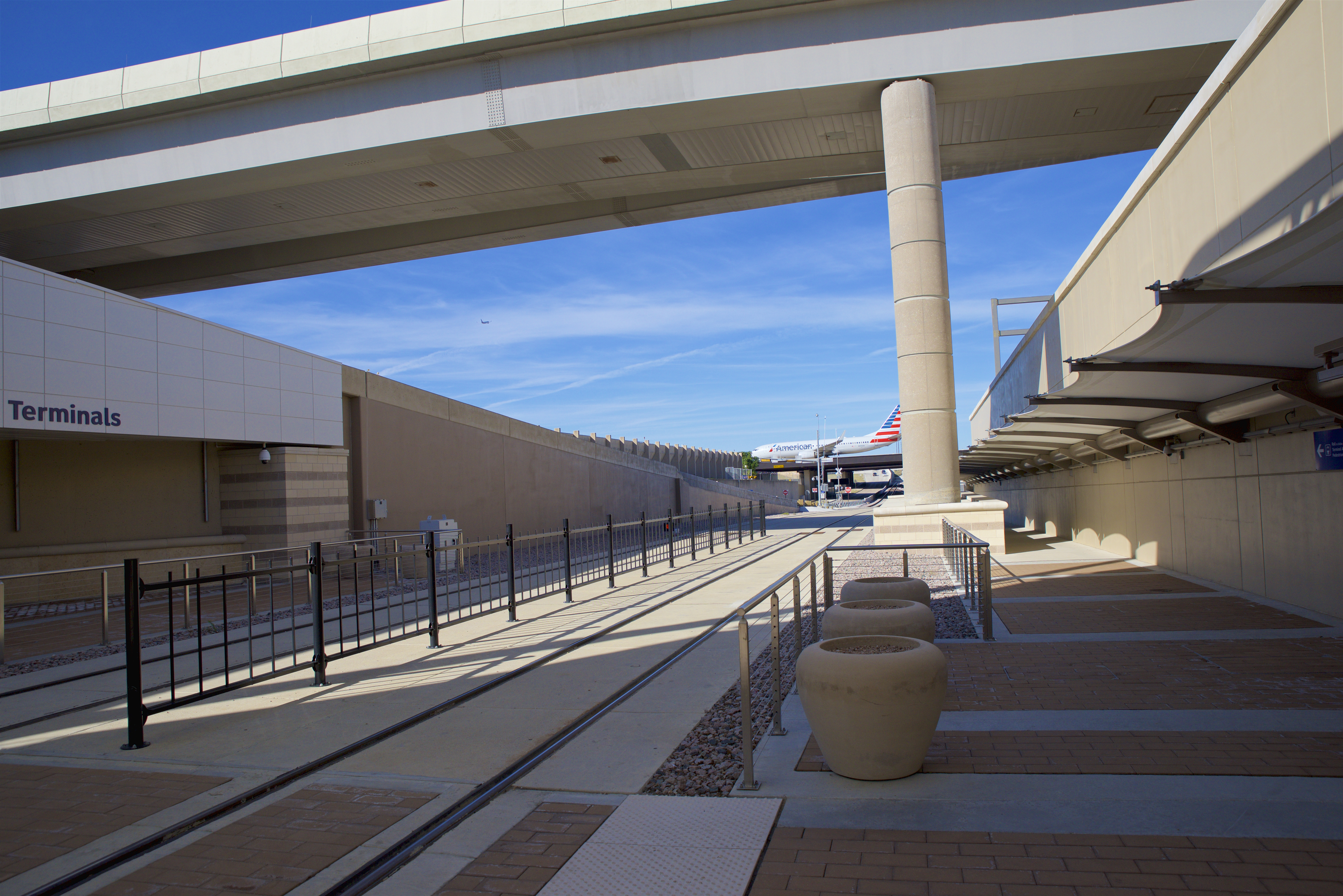
Tracks entering station from the north, with an aircraft overpass visible in background

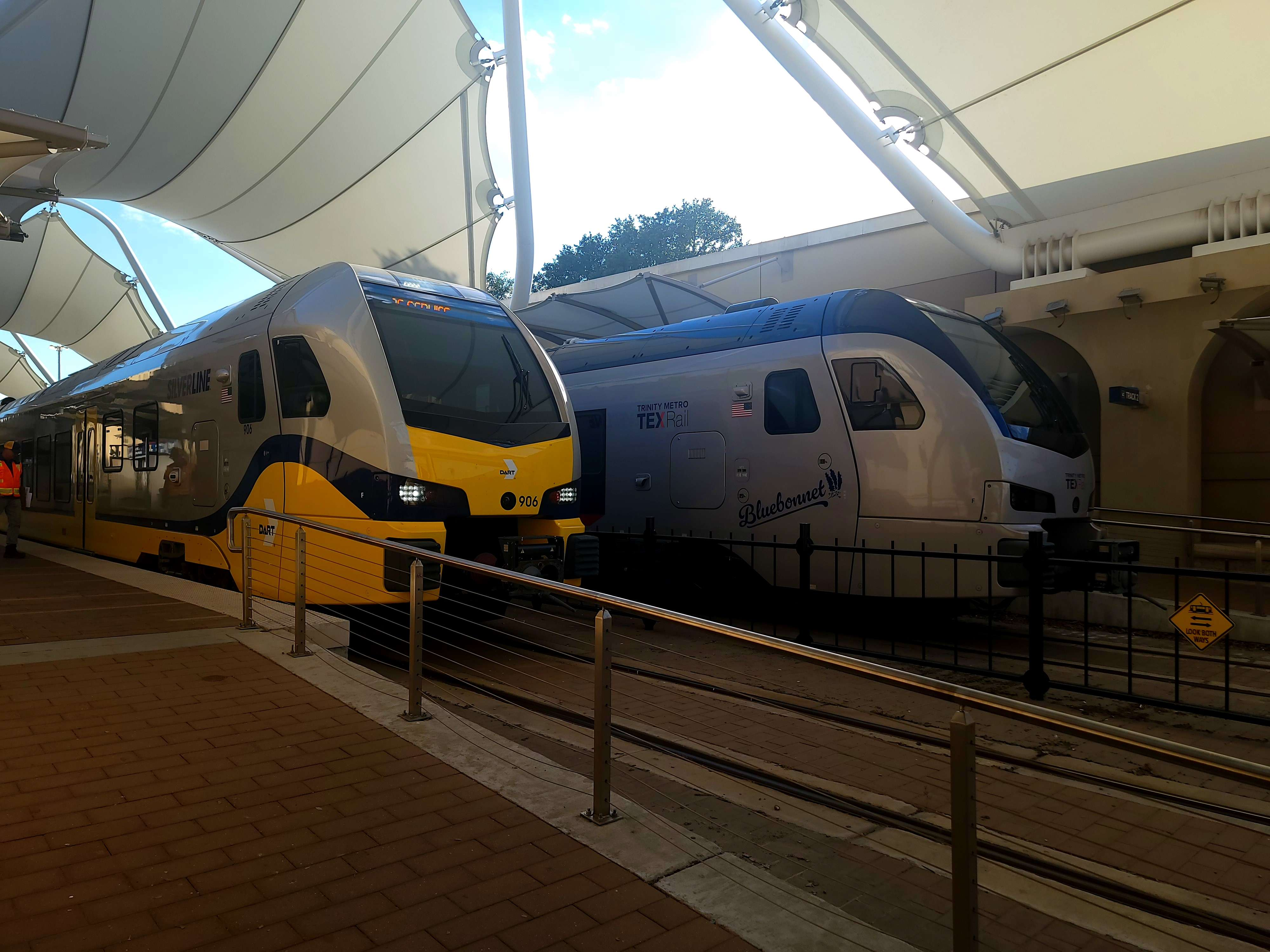
DART Silver Line test train and TEXRail
