= Dallas Union Station =

Large intermodal railroad station in Dallas, Texas

Eddie Bernice Johnson Union Station Dallas, TX
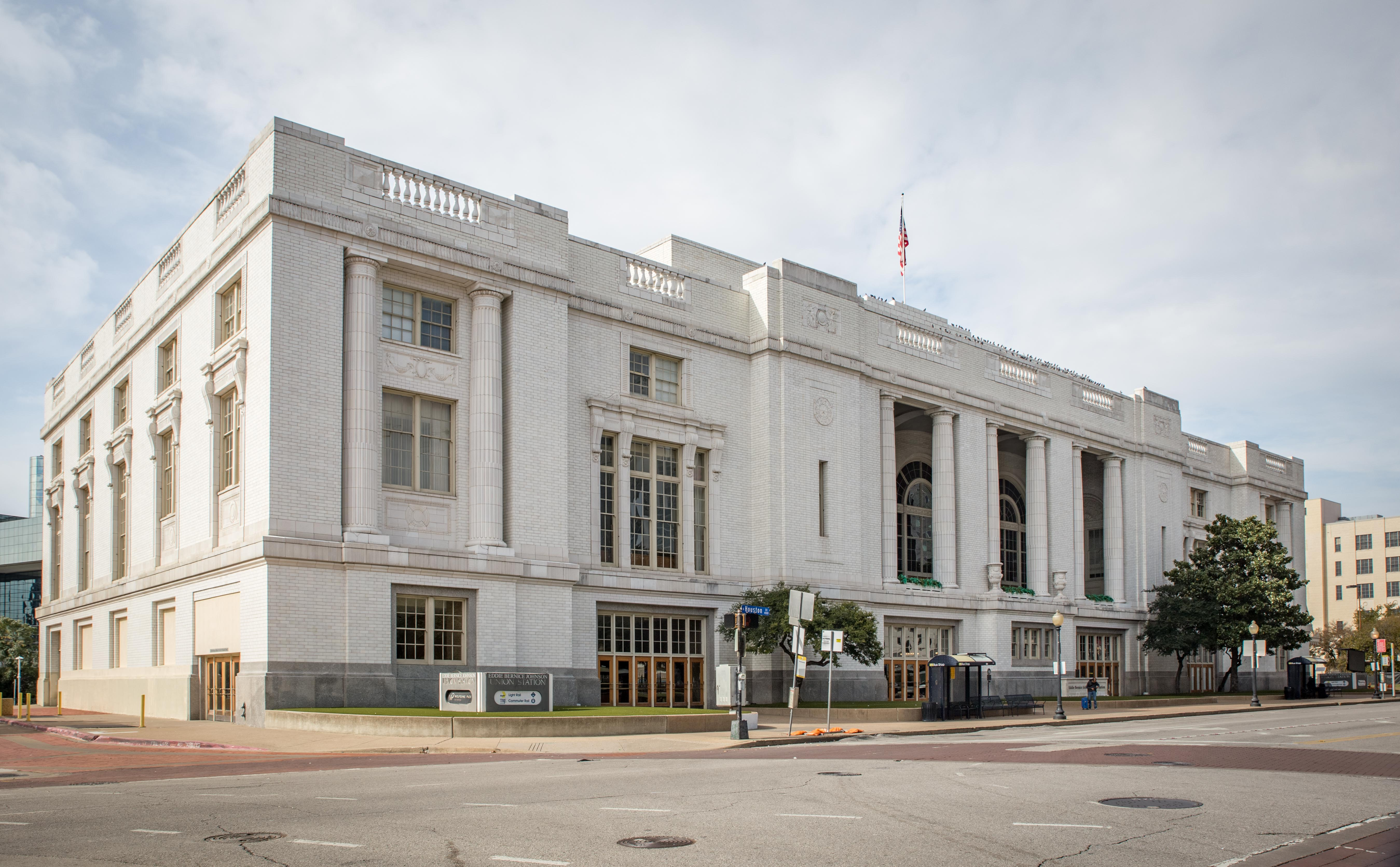

General information
- Other names: Dallas Union Station; EBJ Union Station
- Location: 400 South Houston Street; Dallas, Texas; United States
- Coordinates: 32°46′34″N 96°48′27″W
- Owner: City of Dallas
- Line: Dallas/UP
- Platforms: 1 side and 2 island platforms
- Tracks: 5 + 2 through tracks
- Train operators: Amtrak, TRE and DART rail
- Connections: DART: 9, 45, 147, 214, 224, 306; West Dallas Shuttle

Construction
- Structure type: At-grade
- Parking: 20 long-term and 20 short-term spaces
- Accessible: Yes
- Architect: Jarvis Hunt
- Architectural style: Beaux-Arts

Other information
- Station code: Amtrak: DAL
- Fare zone: TRE: East

History
- Opened: October 14, 1916
- Rebuilt: 1996, 2010
- Former names: Dallas Union Terminal

Passengers
- FY 2025: 61,939 (Amtrak)
- FY 2025: 951 (avg. weekday) ▼8.4% (DART)
- FY 2025: 951 (avg. weekday) ▲5.3% (TRE)

Services
Preceding station	Amtrak	Following station
Fort Worth toward Los Angeles or San Antonio	Texas Eagle	Mineola toward Chicago
Preceding station	Trinity Railway Express	Following station
Victory toward T&P Station	Trinity Railway Express	Terminus
Preceding station	DART	Following station
Convention Center toward UNT Dallas	Blue Line	West End toward Downtown Rowlett
Convention Center toward Westmoreland	Red Line	West End toward Parker Road
Terminus	Dallas Streetcar	Greenbriar toward Bishop Arts
Proposed services
Preceding station	Amtrak	Following station
Fort Worth Terminus	Crescent Proposed Texas Section	Mineola toward New York
Former services
Preceding station	Amtrak	Following station
Fort Worth toward Laredo or Houston	Inter-American	Longview toward Chicago
Corsicana toward Houston	Texas Eagle Until 1995	Mineola toward Chicago
Fort Worth toward Houston	Lone Star 1975–1979	Cleburne toward Chicago
Preceding station	Atchison, Topeka and Santa Fe Railway	Following station
Fort Worth toward San Angelo	San Angelo – Dallas	Terminus
Duncanville toward Cleburne	Cleburne – Paris	Reinhardt toward Paris
Preceding station	Burlington Route	Following station
Fort Worth toward Denver	Denver – Teague Fort Worth and Denver Railway	Waxahachie toward Teague
Preceding station	Chicago, Rock Island and Pacific Railroad	Following station
Waxahachie toward Teague	Teague – Minneapolis	Irving toward Minneapolis
Preceding station	Missouri–Kansas–Texas Railroad	Following station
Waxahachie toward Galveston	Main Line via Dallas	Highland Park toward St. Louis
Roselawn toward Denton	Dallas and Denton	Terminus
Preceding station	Missouri Pacific Railroad	Following station
Fort Worth toward El Paso	Texas and Pacific Railway Main Line	Terrell toward New Orleans
Preceding station	St. Louis–San Francisco Railway	Following station
Irving Terminus	Dallas Branch	Terminus
Preceding station	St. Louis Southwestern Railway	Following station
Terminus	Main Line	Addison toward St. Louis
Addison toward Fort Worth	Fort Worth local	Terminus
- Dallas Union Terminal
- U.S. National Register of Historic Places
- Texas State Antiquities Landmark
- Recorded Texas Historic Landmark
- Dallas Landmark
- Location within Texas Location within the United States
- Interactive map of Dallas Union Terminal
- Area: 5 acres (2.0 ha)
- NRHP reference No.: 75001966
- TSAL No.: 8200000214
- RTHL No.: 6908
- DLMK No.: H/5

Significant dates
- Added to NRHP: May 29, 1975
- Designated TSAL: January 1, 1981
- Designated RTHL: 1979
- Designated DLMK: January 17, 1977
Location

Dallas Union Station, officially Eddie Bernice Johnson Union Station (or simply EBJ Union Station), also known as Dallas Union Terminal, is a large intermodal railroad station in Dallas, Texas. It is located on Houston Street in the Reunion district of Downtown Dallas. The structure is a Dallas Landmark and is listed on the National Register of Historic Places.

The station serves the Red and Blue lines of DART rail, the Dallas Streetcar, Trinity Railway Express commuter rail, and Amtrak inter-city rail. The station is the third busiest Amtrak station in Texas, behind Fort Worth Central Station and San Antonio station. It is also the busiest Trinity Railway Express station.

== Services ==
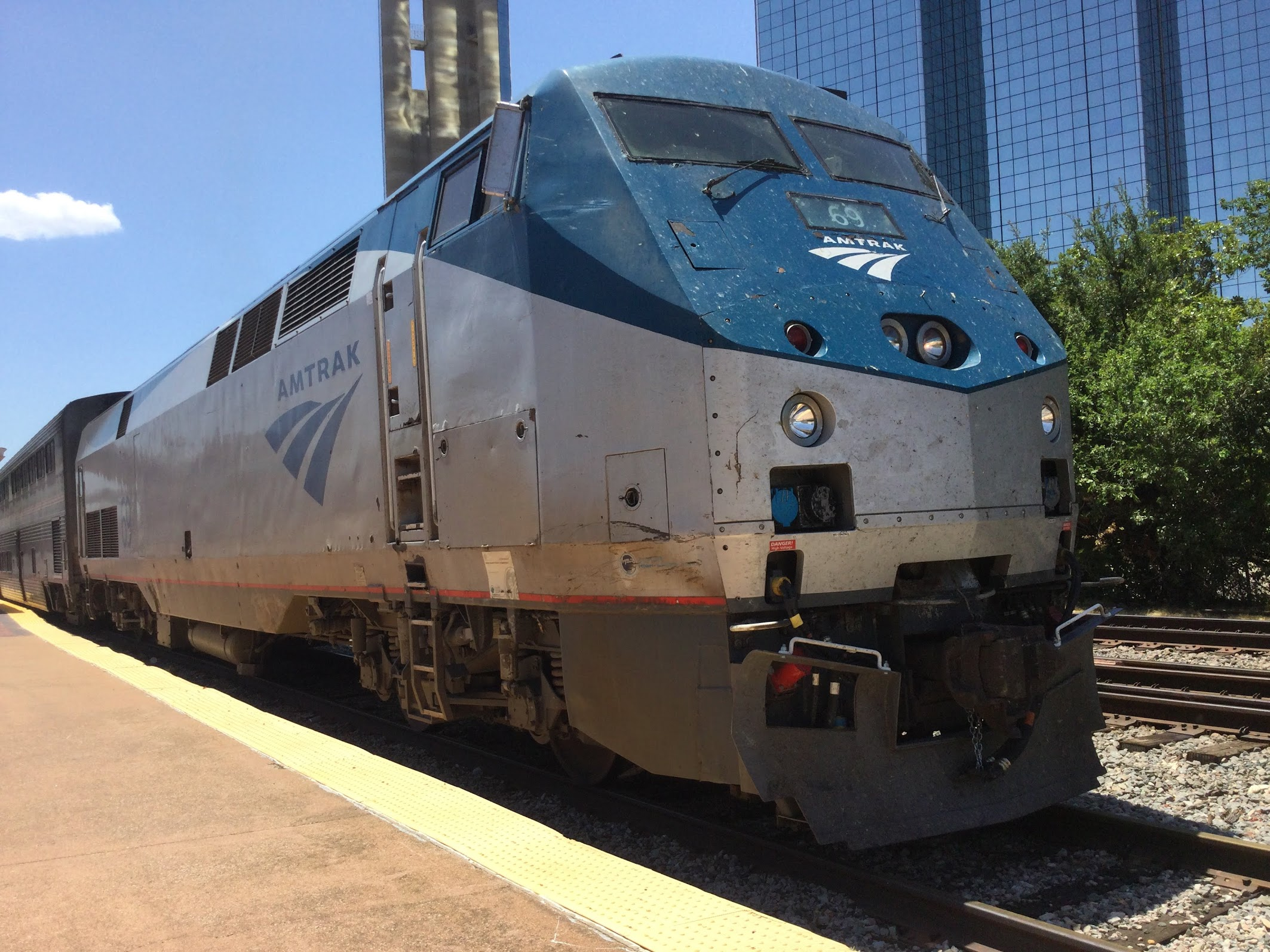
Texas Eagle #421 in Dallas Union Station led by Amtrak P42DC #69

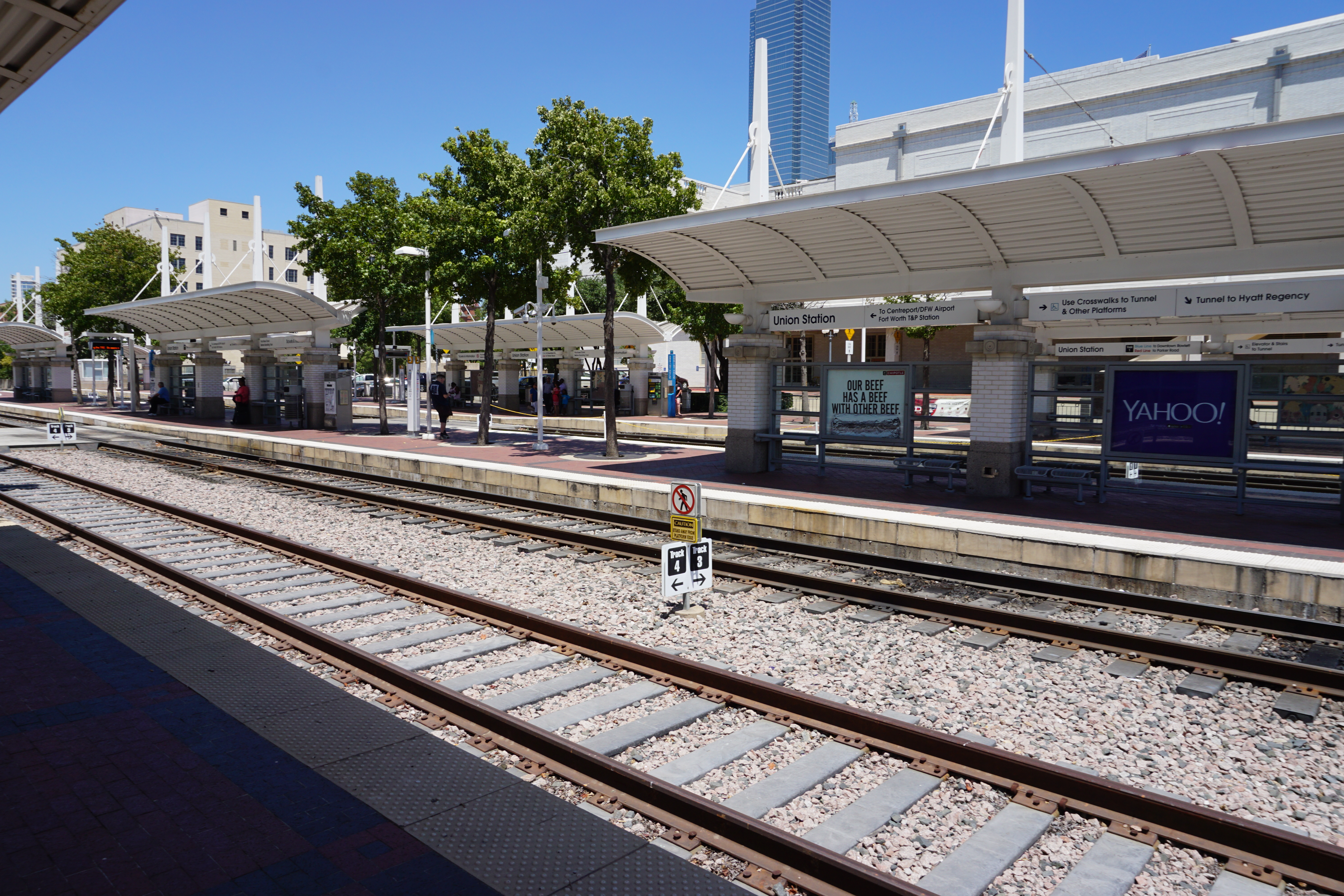
Looking across tracks and platforms

The station is served by Amtrak's Texas Eagle with Chicago as the eastern terminus and either San Antonio or Los Angeles as the western terminus and later by proposed Crescent (train). The light rail station serves as a stop on the Red Blue lines as well as the TRE. Union Station is the northern terminus of the Dallas Streetcar and provides access to the Greyhound bus terminal, the George Allen Courts Building, Dealey Plaza, the Hyatt Regency Dallas at Reunion and Reunion Tower.

The first floor is occupied by an Amtrak ticketing window, a waiting room, and privately rented offices. The second floor contains the restored Grand Hall and several meeting rooms named after railroads that previously serviced Dallas. The second floor and a mezzanine are operated by Wolfgang Puck Catering.

== History ==
A single passenger terminal to replace the depots then scattered around Dallas was among the recommendations of the Kessler Plan, the comprehensive city plan that George Kessler prepared for the city. The Union Terminal Company, chartered in March 1912 by the seven railroads serving the city, built the Dallas Union Terminal, as Union Station was originally called, which opened in October 1916. It consolidated five rail stations into one, making Dallas a major transportation center in the Southern United States; at the peak of its usage, as many as 80 trains stopped each day at the station. It was designed by Jarvis Hunt, who also designed Kansas City Union Station and Joliet Union Station.

Railroads served by the station included Atchison, Topeka and Santa Fe Railway ('Santa Fe'), St. Louis Southwestern Railway ('Cotton Belt'), Fort Worth & Denver Railway, Chicago, Rock Island and Pacific Railroad ('Rock Island'), Burlington-Rock Island Railroad, St. Louis and San Francisco Railway ('Frisco'), Missouri–Kansas–Texas Railroad ('Katy'), Southern Pacific Railroad and Texas & Pacific Railway.

In 1954, the building served as a temporary library while the Dallas Public Library system built a new central library to replace the original Dallas Carnegie Library.

Originally, the 2nd level waiting room was connected to train platforms via an overhead walkway, but this design was never popular with travelers as they needed to climb a large number of stairs. Escalators were added, but the Grand Hall was finally abandoned in favor of renovated ticketing and a waiting room on the ground floor (still in use today). Also, an underground corridor replaced the overhead walkway, with ramps at each platform. Despite Dallas' status as the second most populous city of the state at the time, the Dallas Union Station was eclipsed in some regard by Fort Worth Union Station. For example, the Rock Island Railroad's Twin Star Rocket from Minneapolis terminated at Fort Worth, not at Dallas. The Santa Fe Railroad's Texas Chief from Chicago also took its route through Fort Worth, en route to Houston.

The last passenger train to serve Union Station before the inauguration of Amtrak, the Missouri Pacific Railroad's Texas Eagle, left on May 31, 1969. When it began in the spring of 1971, Amtrak initially consolidated most of its Metroplex service at Fort Worth, but planned to introduce service to Dallas once improvements were made at Union Terminal, which it considered outdated. With those improvements, Amtrak service began on March 14, 1974, with the Inter-American between St. Louis and Laredo; the train evolved into today's Texas Eagle. From 1975 to 1979, the station was also served by the Lone Star, a descendant of an old Santa Fe mainstay, the Texas Chief.

DART's light-rail service began at the station on June 14, 1996. The station's upper-level waiting room was repurposed into meeting and convention space for the Hyatt Regency Dallas, which is connected via an underground walkway.

In October 2016, the Dallas City Council renamed the station to Eddie Bernice Johnson Union Station in honor of U.S. Representative Eddie Bernice Johnson. In April 2019, DART approved the new name and held a dedication ceremony. It is mostly referred to as EBJ Union Station.

== Murals ==
In 1934, as part of the federally sponsored Public Works of Art Project, Jerry Bywaters and Alexandre Hogue were granted the first commission in Texas to create a series of 10 murals depicting events in Dallas history. They had painted them on the walls of the second-floor lobby at the old Dallas City Hall Building, located on Harwood Street between Main and Commerce Streets. In 1954, the original murals were destroyed when City Hall relocated. When the station was renovated to accommodate light rail usage, the murals were partially recreated by Phillip Lamb along the train platforms at Union Station.

== See also ==
- National Register of Historic Places listings in Dallas County, Texas
- Recorded Texas Historic Landmarks in Dallas County
- List of Dallas Landmarks
