= T&P Station =

Terminal commuter rail station in Fort Worth, Texas

Texas and Pacific Station
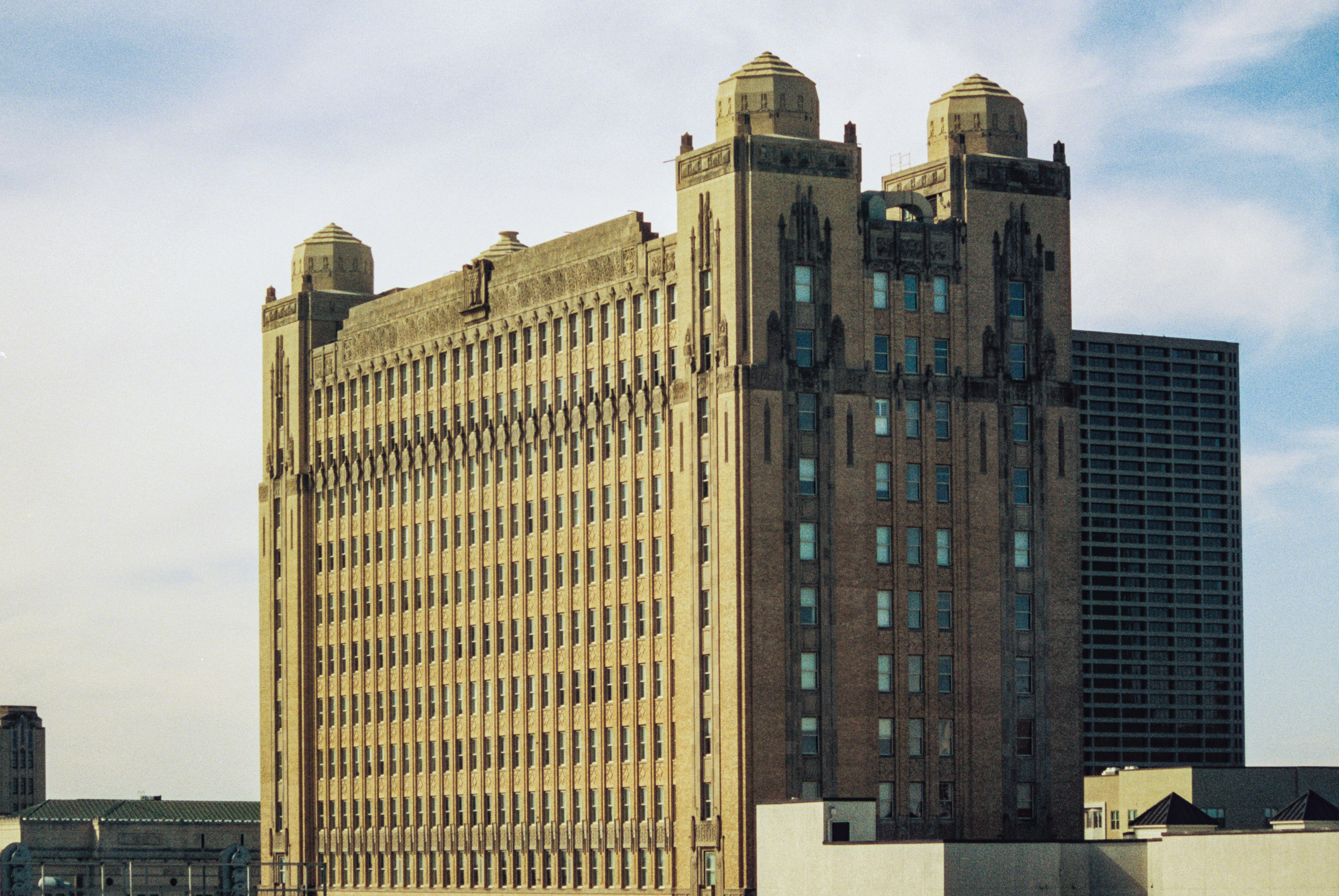
- T&P Passenger Terminal in 2022

General information
- Location: 221 W. Lancaster Ave., Fort Worth, Texas 76102; United States
- Coordinates: 32°44′45″N 97°19′43″W
- Owner: Trinity Metro
- Platforms: 1 island platform
- Tracks: 2
- Connections: Trinity Metro: 6, Blue Line; Southside On-Demand

Construction
- Structure type: At-grade
- Parking: 351 spaces
- Accessible: Yes
- Architect: Wyatt C. Hedrick
- Architectural style: Art Deco, Skyscraper

Other information
- Fare zone: Western TRE Fare Zone

History
- Opened: 1931 (T&P), December 3, 2001 (TRE), December 31, 2018 (preview service), January 10, 2019 (revenue service)
- Closed: 1967
- Rebuilt: 1999 (station building)

Passengers
- FY 2025: 455 (avg. weekday) ▲6.1% (TRE)

Services
Preceding station	Trinity Railway Express	Following station
Terminus	Trinity Railway Express	Fort Worth Central Station toward Dallas Union Station
Preceding station	Trinity Metro	Following station
Terminus	TEXRail	Fort Worth Central Station toward DFW Airport Terminal B
Former services
Preceding station	Burlington Route	Following station
Saginaw toward Denver	Denver – Teague	Dallas toward Teague
Preceding station	Missouri–Kansas–Texas Railroad	Following station
Alvarado toward Galveston	Main Line via Ft. Worth	Denton toward St. Louis
Preceding station	Missouri Pacific Railroad	Following station
Sunset Terrace toward El Paso	Texas and Pacific Railway Main Line	Dallas toward New Orleans
- Texas and Pacific Terminal Complex
- U.S. National Register of Historic Places
- Recorded Texas Historic Landmark
- Interactive map of Texas and Pacific Terminal Complex
- Area: 10.7 acres (4.3 ha)
- Built: 1928
- NRHP reference No.: 78002983
- RTHL No.: 5243

Significant dates
- Added to NRHP: May 26, 1978
- Designated RTHL: 1980
Location

Texas and Pacific Station, commonly known as T&P Station, is a terminal Trinity Railway Express and TEXRail commuter railroad station is located at 1600 Throckmorton Street in Fort Worth, Texas, on the south side of downtown. It is the current western terminus of the TRE commuter line, and is located near the Fort Worth Convention Center, the Fort Worth Water Gardens, Sundance Square and Tarrant County government facilities. T&P Station features free parking (unlike the nearby Fort Worth Central Station) which can be accessed from West Vickery Boulevard.

== History ==
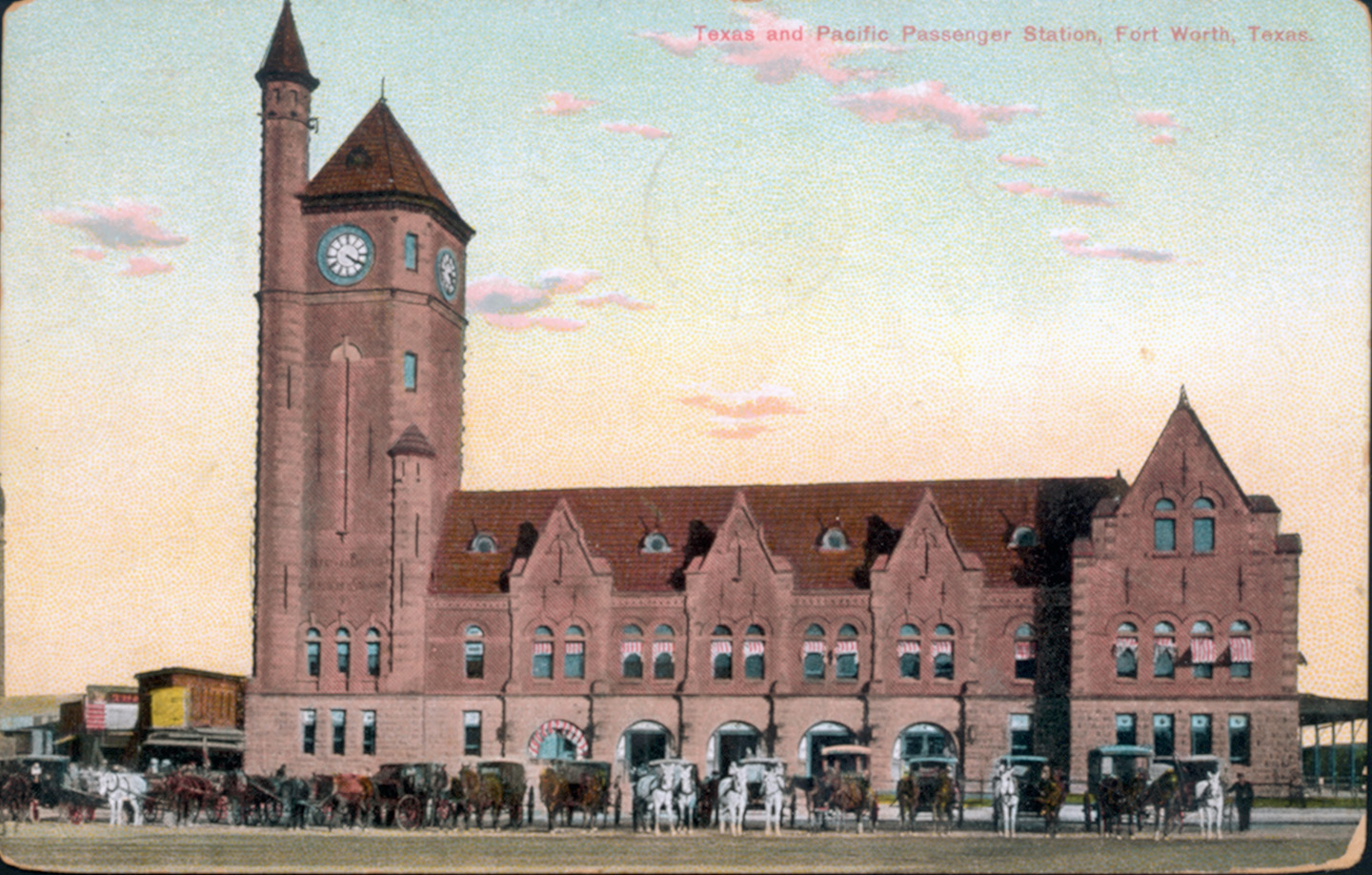
Postcard of the original T&P Station, 1910

The current Texas & Pacific Station building was built by the Texas and Pacific Railway. It opened on October 25, 1931, as a replacement for an earlier station. It was originally listed at the address, 221 W. Lancaster Avenue. It was designed in the Zigzag Moderne Art Deco style popular at the time. The opulent lobby features marble floors, metal-inlaid panel ceilings, and nickel and brass fixtures, incorporating the zigzags and chevrons distinctive of the style. The terminal facilities also included the larger Texas & Pacific Warehouse one block to the west, built in the same style as the station. The T&P Warehouse remains vacant despite significant civic support and third-party developer interest.

During the heyday of American passenger railroading, the station was also served by trains of the CB&Q (through the subsidiary Colorado and Southern Railroad and the Fort Worth and Denver Railway), Missouri Pacific, Katy, and Frisco Lines. Other railroads, such as the Santa Fe and Rock Island Lines, stopped at the nearby Gulf, Colorado and Santa Fe Railroad Passenger Station. The Texas & Pacific ran the Louisiana Eagle from New Orleans to Fort Worth, until 1963. A successor night train and a successor day train ran on the route to New Orleans as late as 1968. Up to the station's waning years, the Texas & Pacific ran the West Texas Eagle section of the Texas Eagle from St. Louis to the station, after breaking off at Longview.

The station declined along with the rest of the Lancaster Avenue area when the elevated portion of Interstate 30 was built in 1958, effectively separating the area from downtown. The railroad vacated the terminal in 1967 when passenger service in Fort Worth ended, dispatching offices remained on the third floor until November 1, 1981, and the Department of Housing and Urban Development became the exclusive tenant from the early 1980s until the late 1990s.

The passenger area of the station, which had not been occupied by HUD and was virtually untouched since 1967, was restored to its former beauty in 1999 at a cost of $1.4 million. Passenger service resumed at Texas & Pacific station on December 3, 2001, with the TRE's extension into Fort Worth.

== Future plans ==
The demolition of the elevated highway in 2002 opened the Lancaster Avenue area for redevelopment. The upper floors of the T&P station have been renovated and are available for purchase as condominiums. The building's facade also underwent renovation and a new parking facility was built on the south side of the building. The historic diner on the ground floor was renovated and converted into a bar called the T&P Tavern. The T&P Warehouse building has not yet been renovated and is currently vacant; in July 2007, after nearly four years of negotiations, the city of Fort Worth contracted with Dallas owner Cleopatra Investments to begin residential development, slated for completion in 2012. The building remains vacant as of Qtr.2, 2022.

Trinity Metro plans to demolish and rebuild the station's commuter rail platform to accommodate the planned expansion of TEXRail to Near Southside.

== Photo gallery ==
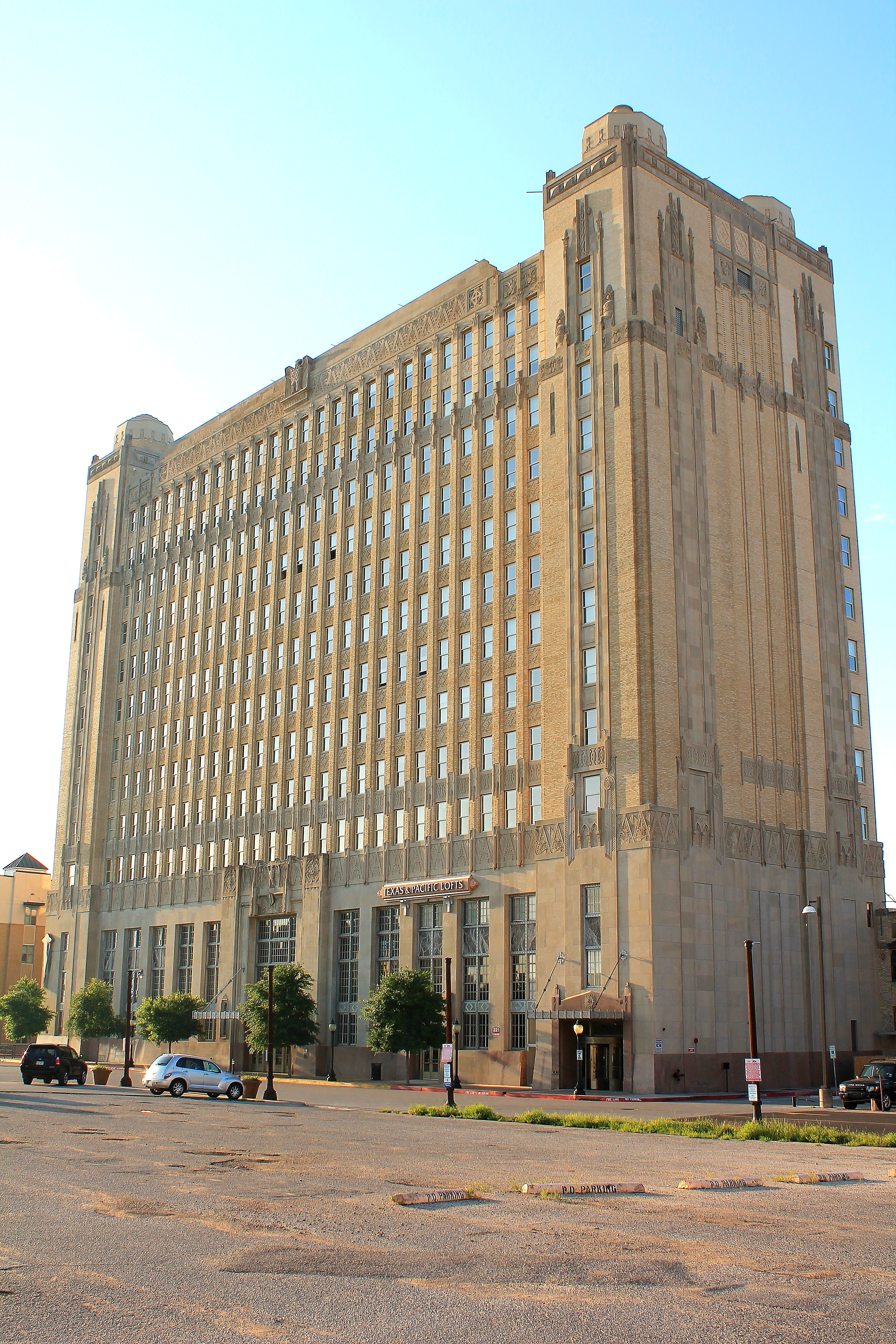
Texas & Pacific Station

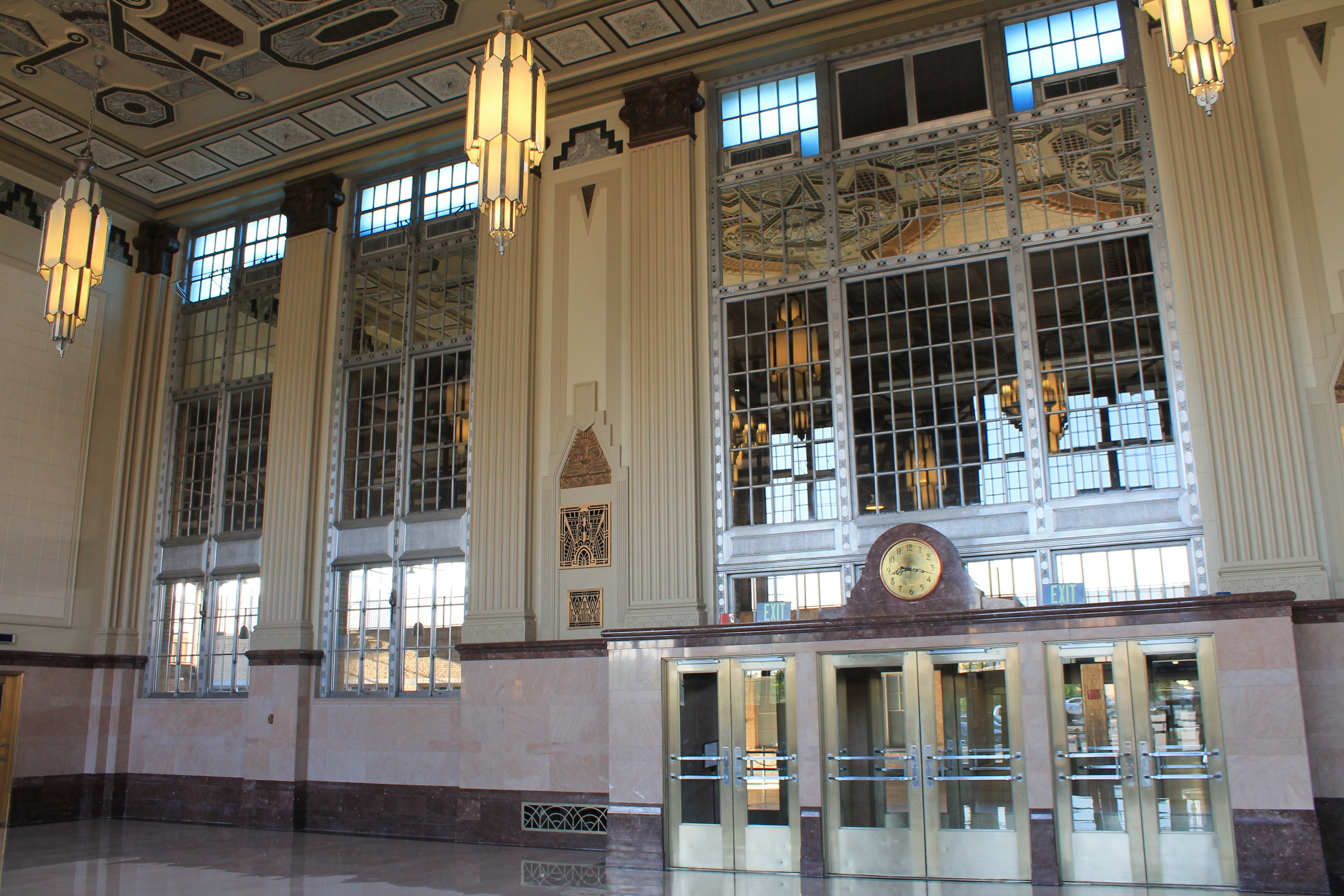
View of the entrance

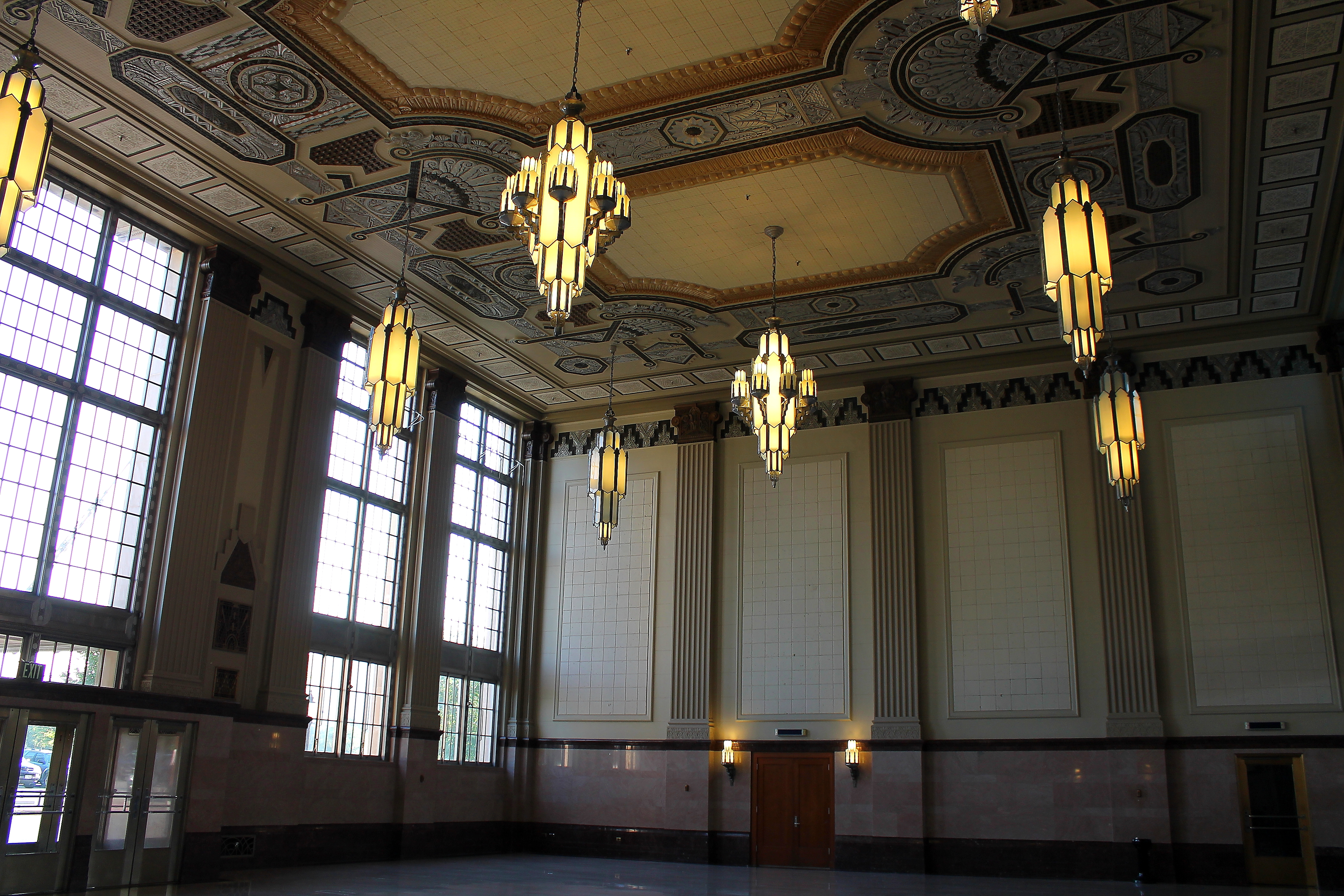
Interior view.

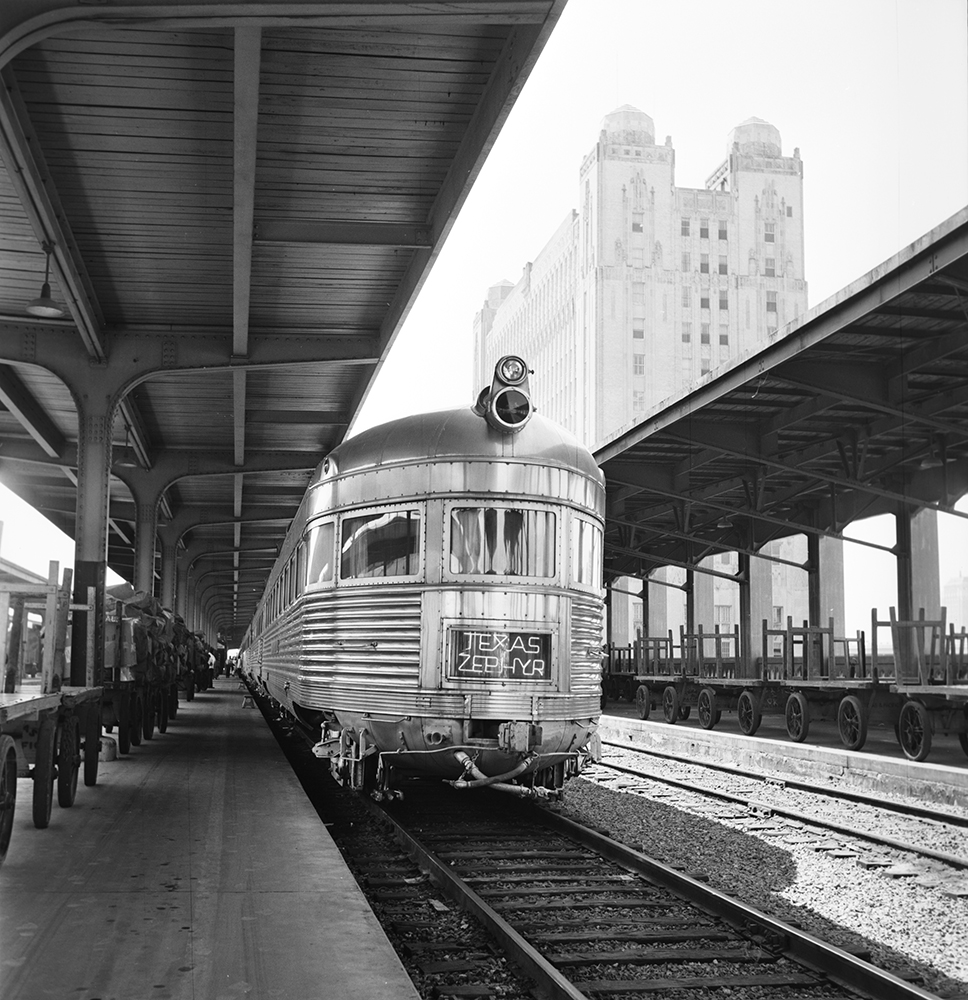
The Texas Zephyr beside the station, August 1962.

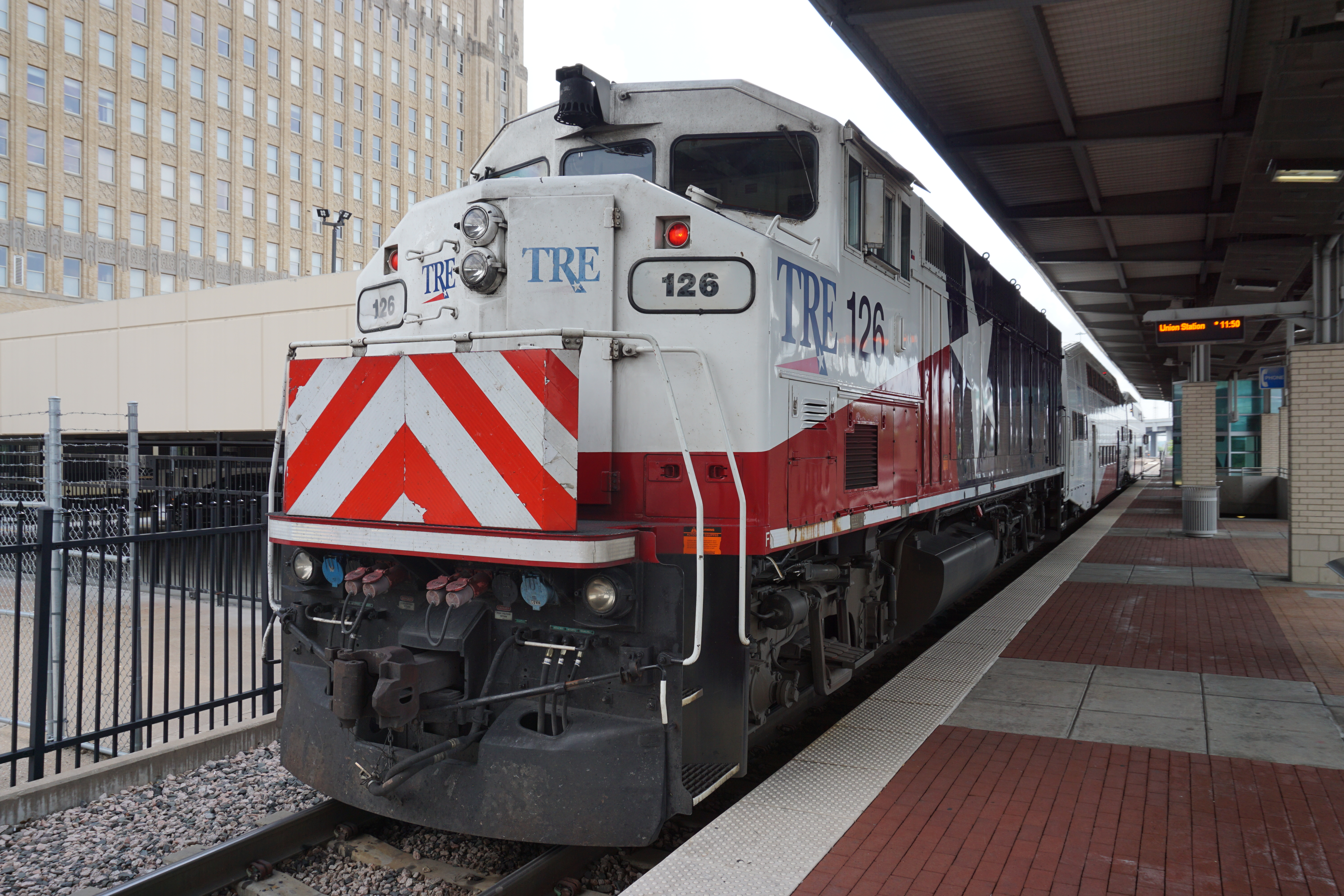
A TRE train at the station in 2016.

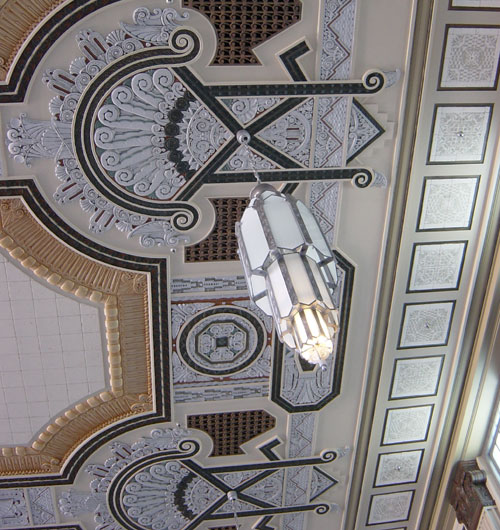
Interior view of main passenger lobby showing the art deco-style fixtures and ceiling detail

== See also ==
- National Register of Historic Places listings in Tarrant County, Texas
- Recorded Texas Historic Landmarks in Tarrant County
