= Hyatt Regency Dallas =

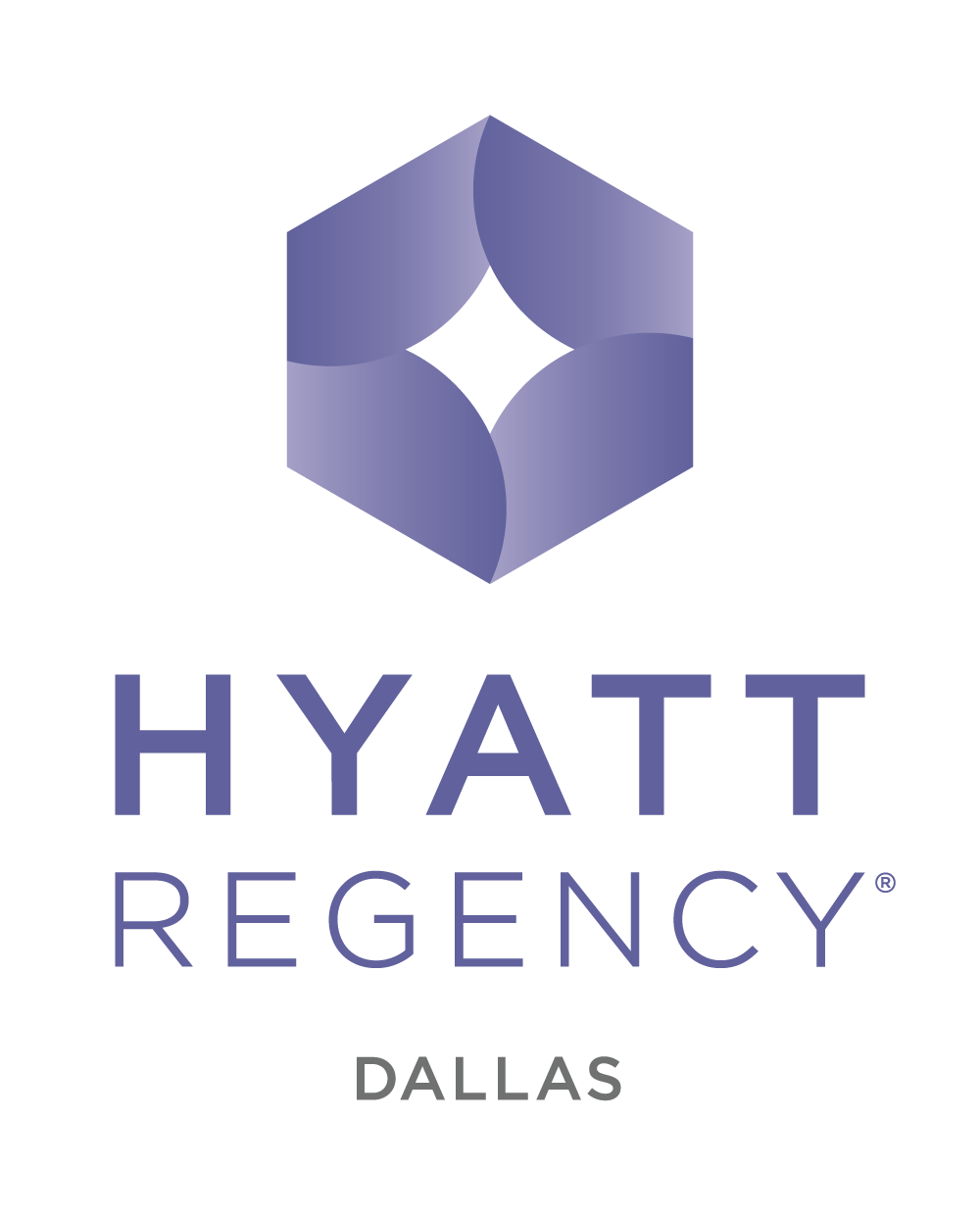

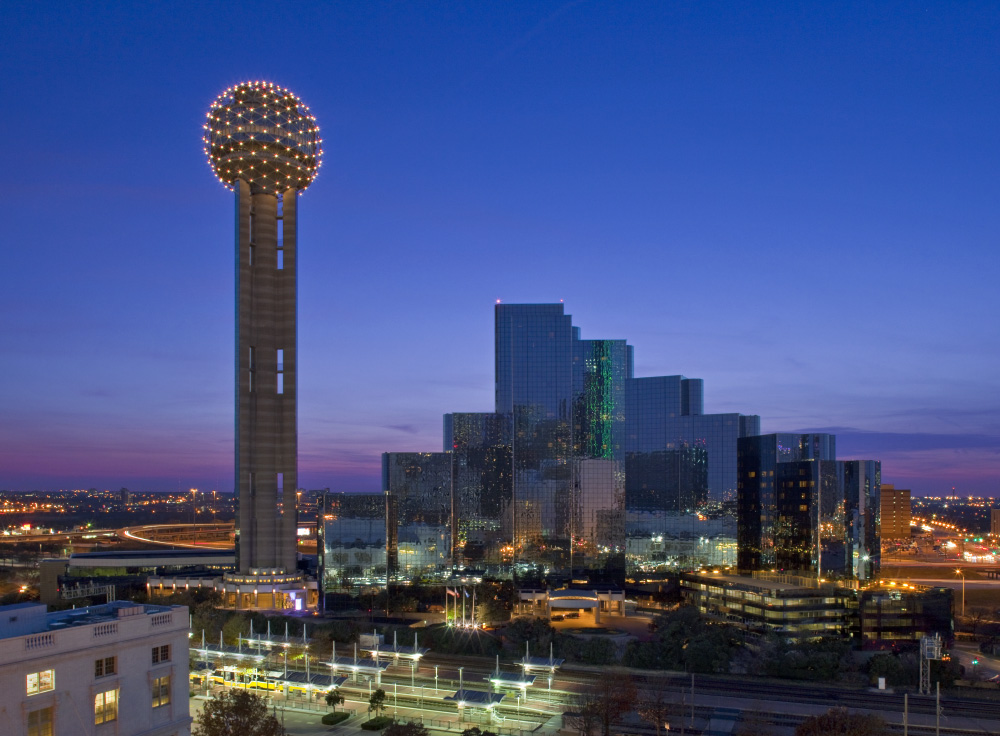
- Interactive map of the Hyatt Regency Dallas area

General information
- Status: Completed
- Type: Hotel
- Location: 300 Reunion Boulevard; Dallas, Texas; 75207
- Coordinates: 32°46′33″N 96°48′34″W
- Opening: 1978
- Renovated: 2012

Height
- Roof: 343 ft (105 m)

Technical details
- Floor count: 28

Design and construction
- Architects: Welton Becket & Associates
- Developer: Woodbine Development Corp.

Website
- Hyatt Regency Dallas

The Hyatt Regency Dallas is a 28-story, 1,120-room hotel in the Reunion district of downtown Dallas, Texas, United States The building is connected to Union Station and Reunion Tower, which is the city's landmark observation tower in downtown Dallas. The Y-shaped building has an atrium on the south side. In 1998, the hotel added a low-rise ballroom with an area of 32,000 square feet (the equivalent of 3,000 square meters). The Hyatt Regency Dallas completed a $50 million renovation in April of 2013 that features newly redone guest rooms, bathrooms, and corridors.

== In popular culture ==
The building was featured in the opening credits of the TV series Dallas for the entirety of the show's 13-year run (1978–1991).
