= Reunion District, Dallas =

Neighborhood in Dallas, Texas

Reunion District
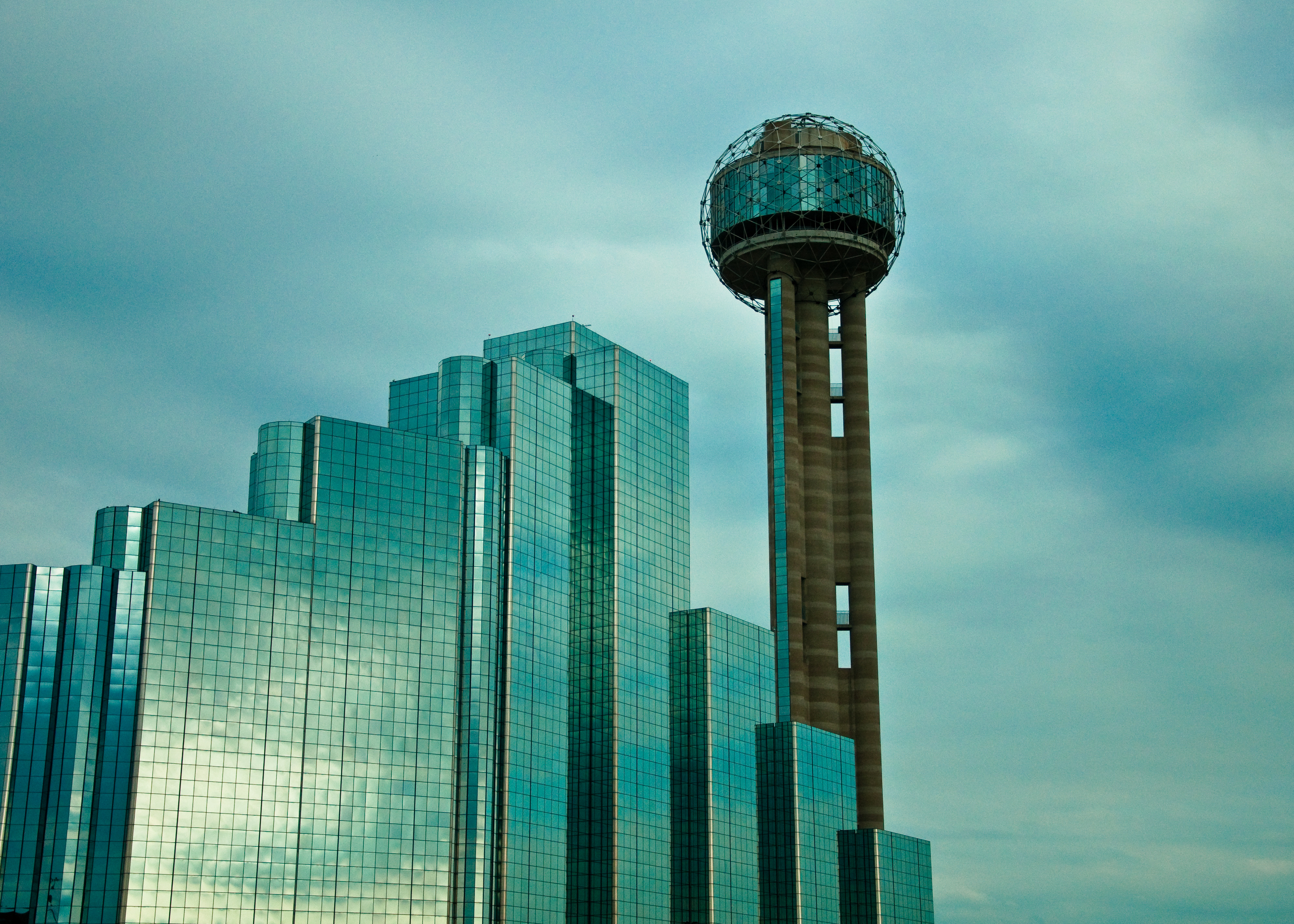
- The Hyatt Regency Dallas and Reunion Tower

- Location in Dallas
- Country: United States
- State: Texas
- Counties: Dallas
- City: Dallas
- Area: Downtown
- Elevation: 397 ft (121 m)
- ZIP code: 75202
- Area codes: 214, 469, 972

The Reunion district of downtown Dallas, Texas, US, is an area in western downtown anchored by the Hyatt Regency Dallas and Reunion Tower. The name "Reunion" originates from the mid-nineteenth century commune La Reunion.

The district included Reunion Arena from 1980 to its demolition in 2009. The arena was originally intended to be an economic engine to drive redevelopment of the surrounding district. However, the real estate bust of the 1980s discouraged owner Ray Hunt and his Woodbine Development Corp. from investing beyond the Hyatt and the Tower, and no further building took place. It was originally proposed to be named "Esplanade" by marketing consultants, but this was rejected by developer John Scovell of Woodbine, in favor of the Reunion name after studying the local La Reunion colony. With the Mavericks and Stars having relocated to American Airlines Center, plans indicated that the land would be put to other uses after demolition of the arena in November 2009, no further use for the former arena site has been found..

The Reunion District of downtown Dallas, Texas, is undergoing major redevelopment. The area had remained largely vacant since the demolition of Reunion Arena in 2009. Hunt Realty Investments is leading a $5 billion project to transform 20 acres around the Hyatt Regency Dallas and Reunion Tower. The plan includes housing, with many units designated as affordable, a hotel with 600 to 1,000 rooms, 150,000 square feet of retail space, up to 2 million square feet of office space, and a 3- to 4-acre public park.

The site could support around 5,000 new residents. That would be about one-third of the current downtown population. Hart Howerton, a design and planning firm, is leading the project's master planning.

The redevelopment is timed to coincide with the $3 billion rebuild of the Kay Bailey Hutchison Convention Center. The plan also includes upgrades to Union Station and better pedestrian connections.

Some infrastructure issues remain unresolved. These include the alignment of a proposed high-speed rail line and the final location of the new convention center.

== Attractions ==
- Hyatt Regency Dallas
- Reunion Tower

== Transportation ==
=== Highways ===
- - Interstate 30
- - Interstate 35E

=== Trains ===
==== Commuter ====
- Trinity Railway Express
  - Union Station

==== Light Rail ====
- DART: Blue Line and Red Line
  - Union Station

==== Regional ====
- Amtrak
  - Union Station

== Education ==
The district is zoned to schools in the Dallas Independent School District.

Residents of the district are zoned to City Park Elementary School, Billy Earl Dade Middle School, and James Madison High School.
