= Reunion Tower =

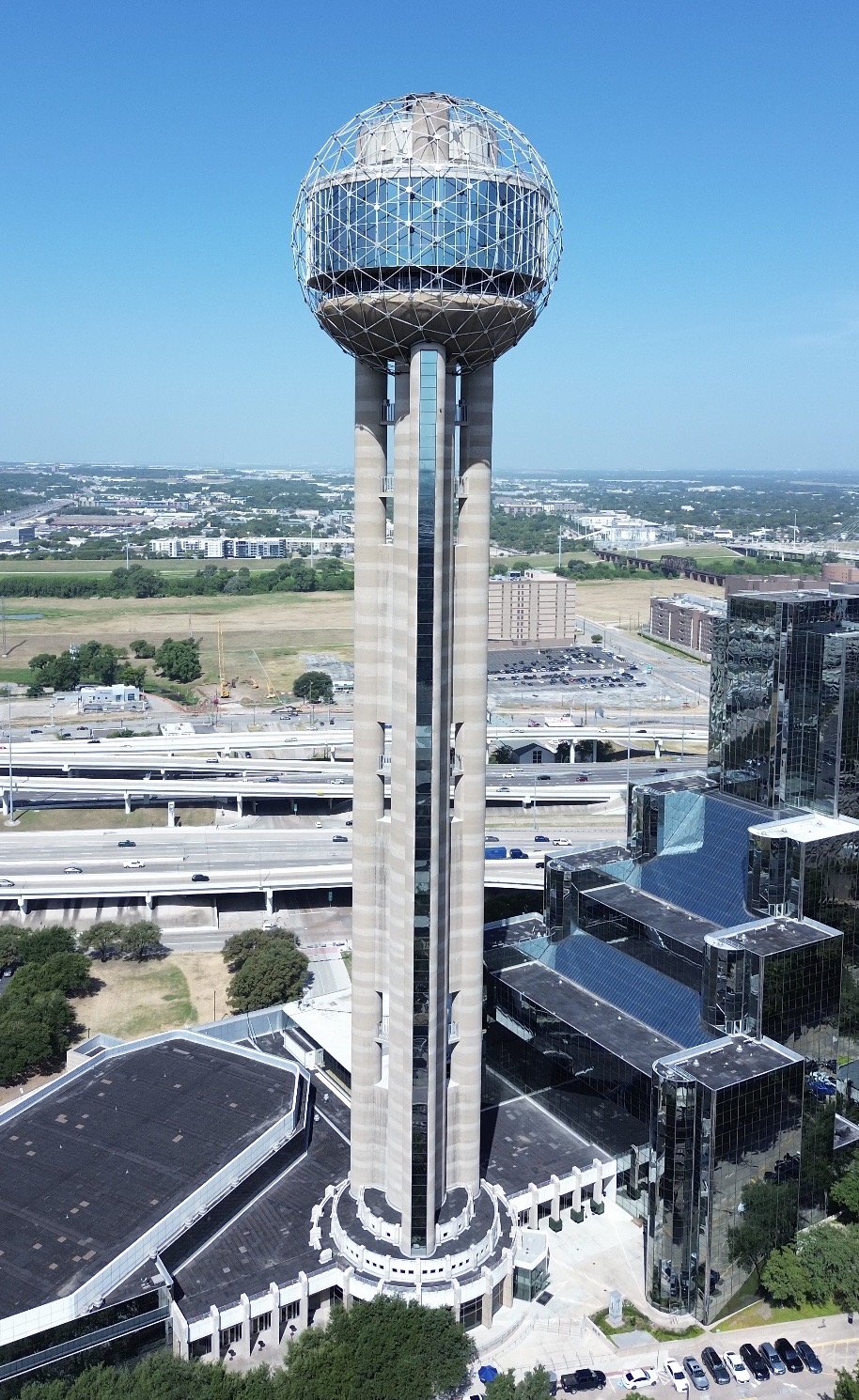
- Interactive map of the Reunion Tower area

General information
- Type: Observation tower
- Location: 300 Reunion Boulevard; Dallas, Texas; 75207
- Coordinates: 32.7753°N 96.8089°W
- Completed: 1978
- Owner: Ray Lee Hunt

Height
- Roof: 561 ft (171 m)

Technical details
- Material: 259 LED Fixtures
- Floor count: 3
- Lifts/elevators: 10

Design and construction
- Architect: Welton Becket and Associates
- Main contractor: The Beck Group
- Known for: Defining iconic Dallas skyline with LED lighting

Renovating team
- Other designers: Wiedamark

Website
- reuniontower.com

Reunion Tower is a 561 ft (171 m) observation tower in Dallas, and one of the city's most recognizable landmarks. The tower is located at 300 Reunion Boulevard in the Reunion district of downtown Dallas, which is named after the mid-nineteenth century commune La Reunion. A free-standing structure until the construction of an addition to the Hyatt Regency Dallas and surrounding complex in 1998, the tower is the city's 15th tallest occupiable structure. It was designed by architectural firm Welton Becket & Associates.

== History ==
Reunion Tower, also known locally as "The Ball", was completed on February 2, 1978, along with the Hyatt Regency Dallas at Reunion, as part of an urban redevelopment project that also renovated the historic Union Station, which today services Amtrak, Dallas Area Rapid Transit, and the Trinity Railway Express to Dallas Fort Worth International Airport and Fort Worth.

Although construction of Reunion Tower was completed on February 2, 1978, the landmark officially opened to the public on April 15, 1978, quickly becoming one of Dallas' most recognizable attractions and a defining feature of the city's skyline.

The first light show on Reunion Tower illuminated the Dallas skyline during a holiday ceremony in December 1977, several months before the tower officially opened to the public.

Henry C Beck Company was the tower's prime construction contractor.

It was originally proposed to be named "Esplanade" by marketing consultants, but this was rejected by developer John Scovell of the Woodbine Development Corporation, in favor of the Reunion name after studying the local La Reunion colony.

When it first opened, the tower included radio station KOAX-FM, now KRLD-FM 105.3 FM, once owned by Westinghouse Broadcasting ("Live twenty-four hours a day from five-hundred feet above the city"). Because it is not used as a broadcast tower, it is not listed in the FCC Database.

Reunion Tower reopened its restaurant level on February 9, 2009, after it was closed for major renovations on November 16, 2007. The observation deck reopened October 5, 2013, just in time for the Tower's 35th anniversary.

The tower is located about 1,000 feet from Dealey Plaza and the site of the assassination of John F. Kennedy.

== Architecture ==
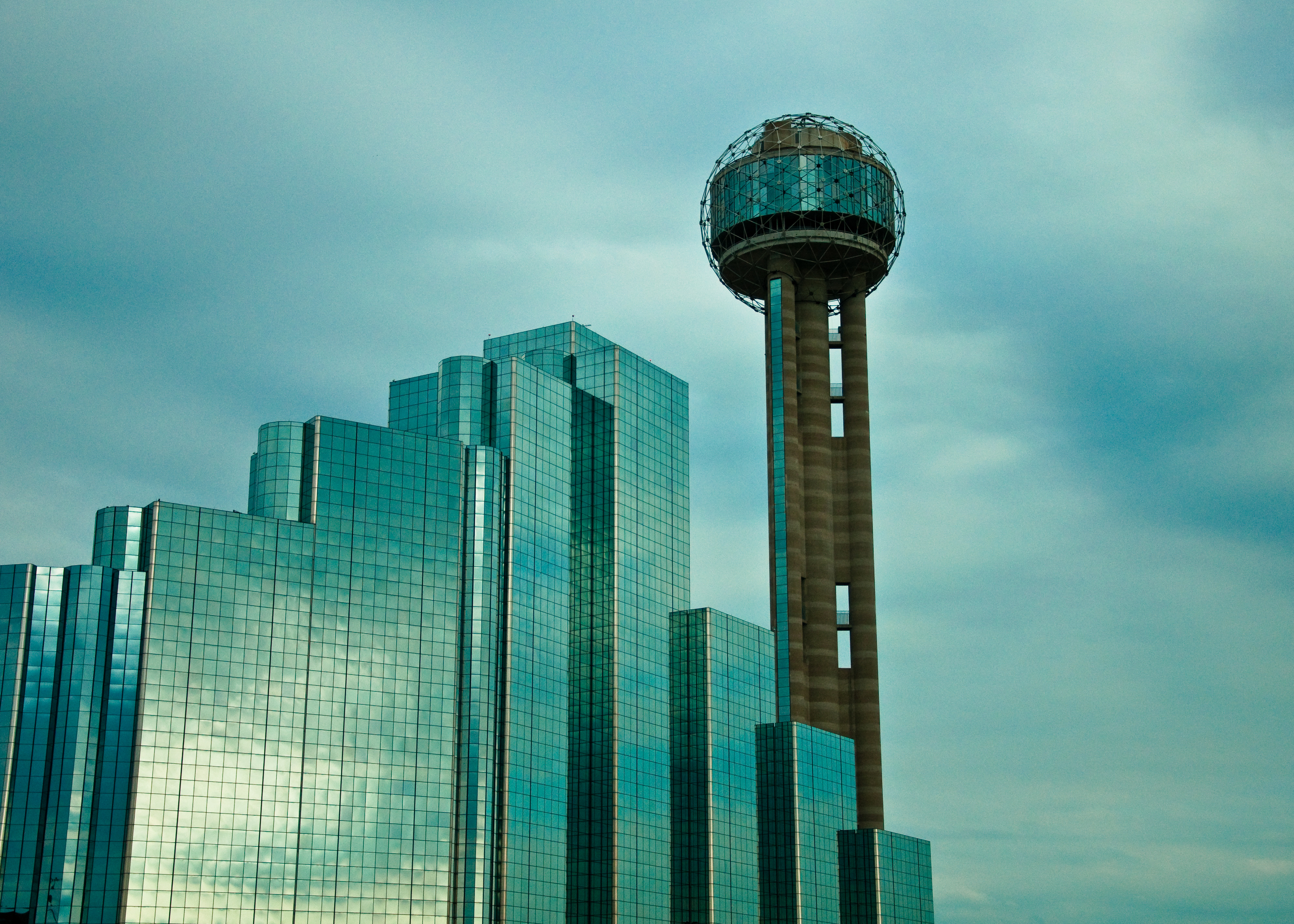
Reunion Tower rising over the Hyatt Regency Dallas

The tower contains three floors with circular floor plans on top of four shafts of poured-in-place concrete. A central cylindrical shaft houses both stairs and mechanical equipment. Three rectangular shafts, featuring elevators, rise parallel to the central shaft. Each shaft's outfacing wall is made up of glass panels, providing tourists views of the city during the 60-second elevator ride to the top. Before renovations in 2008, the first level housed the observation deck, the second a revolving restaurant called Antares, and the third level a club called The Dome. The top three floors are encased in an open-air sphere, which is a geodesic dome formed with aluminum struts. Every one of the struts' 259 intersections is covered by aluminum circles with lights in the center.

=== Lighting ===
At night, the globe at the tower's top is illuminated with 259 custom LED fixtures, manufactured by Altman Lighting and Color Kinetics, a division of Philips Solid State Lighting. Wiedamark, a Dallas-based LED lighting company, led the development, installation and programming of the lights. Reunion Tower was originally illuminated with conventional incandescent fixtures. In 2011, these were replaced with a programmable LED lighting system consisting of 259 RGB LED fixtures, allowing the tower to display animated light shows, holiday displays, sports celebrations, and civic messages. The new system debuted to the public during a New Year's Eve light show welcoming 2012.

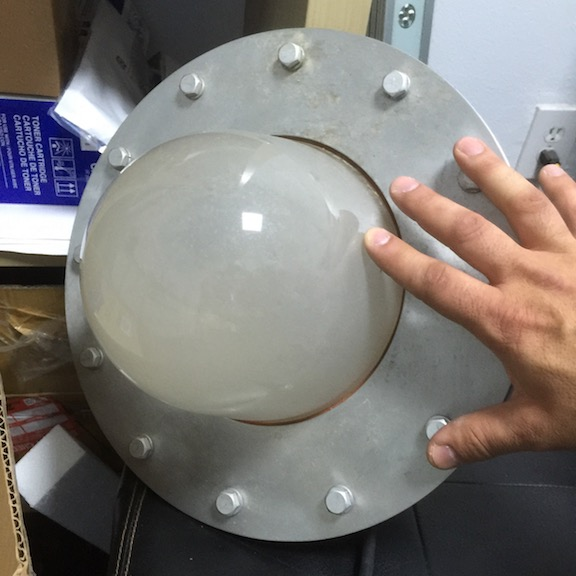
Front view of a single RGB LED lighting fixture from Reunion Tower in Dallas, Texas. Courtesy of Wiedamark.

Every fixture has a collaboration of several RGB LED lights that are diffused behind a 3/4-inch thick opaque glass cover. While each fixture is very large at nearly 16 inches in diameter, they function in exactly the same way as a pixel on a screen. By varying the intensity of red, green and blue, the system is able to create every visible color from pinks and purples to white. By moving these colors around the globe at a fluid rate, animations and movement are perceived. All 259 fixtures are controlled by Color Kinetics hardware to execute various computer-generated patterns and colors along the surface of the sphere. The DMX512 lighting protocol is used to communicate with the fixtures. Each fixture is manufactured from solid cast stainless steel and weighs over 20 pounds.

The tower is an iconic landmark on the Dallas skyline, the lighting on the globe is often used for special events and holidays across the city. For example the globe is illuminated with festive animations during the winter holidays, lit green for St. Patrick's day and red white and blue for patriotic events. The globe was lit up in rainbow colors on June 26, 2015 to celebrate the supreme court ruling which legalized same sex marriage.

In 2026, Reunion Tower underwent its first major lighting upgrade since 2012. The new custom-designed LED system increased the number of individual light points from 259 to 8,547, providing greater brightness, improved color accuracy, enhanced animation capabilities, and expanded display resolution. The upgraded system also reduced fixture weight while incorporating approximately nine miles of wiring throughout the geodesic sphere.

== Attractions ==
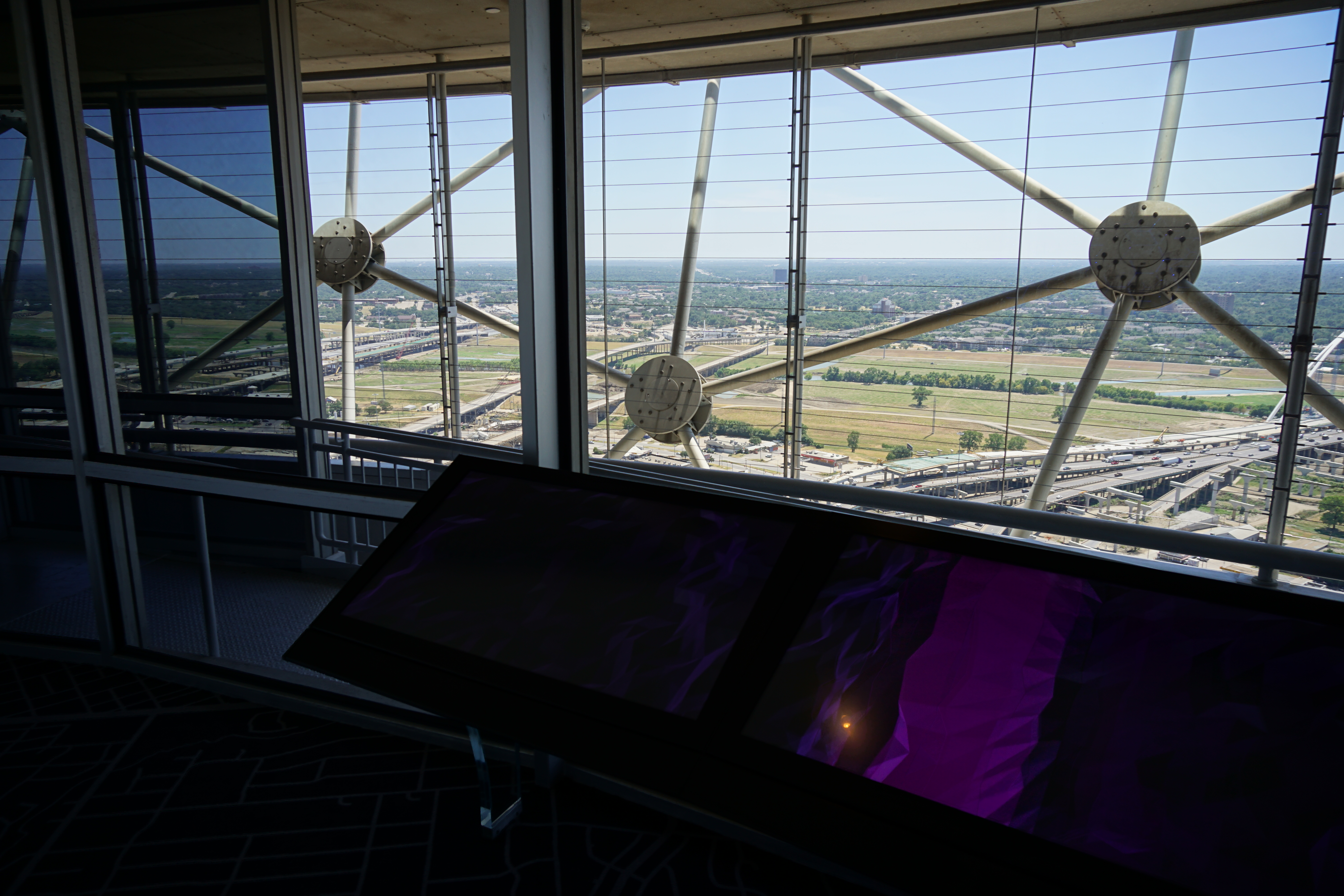
A view from Reunion Tower's "GeO-Deck" observation deck

Celebrity chef Wolfgang Puck opened the fine dining revolving restaurant Five Sixty on the tower's rotating top level on February 11, 2009. The name was a reference to the restaurant's elevation. After 11 years, Five Sixty closed permanently in April 2020 due to the COVID-19 pandemic. The current restaurant, Crown Block, features steaks and seafood, and does not rotate.

The Observation level is called the "GeO-Deck". The interior facility includes an interactive digital experience featuring information about Dallas landmarks, Reunion Tower itself, the events of November 22, 1963, live view high-definition cameras and more. The exterior of the observation deck features telescopes with views in every direction.

The gift shop at the tower's base features souvenirs related to Reunion Tower, Dallas and Texas and other novelty items.

Lone Star NYE

Since 2015, Reunion Tower has served as the focal point of the annual Lone Star NYE celebration, one of the largest New Year's Eve events in Texas. The event features synchronized fireworks, LED light shows, and, beginning in later editions, large-scale drone displays. By its tenth anniversary celebration on December 31, 2025, the event included more than 5,000 pyrotechnic effects, a choreographed lighting display on the tower's geodesic sphere, and 500 drones. The event is broadcast live and visible throughout the Dallas–Fort Worth metroplex.

== In popular culture ==
- Reunion Tower is shown in the open credits of Dallas. It is also the setting for a scene in the second season of the show. At the time, the structure had only been standing for a few months.
- The landmark appears as a symbol of futurist society in the 1980 film The Lathe of Heaven.
- Reunion Tower is the setting for the finale of the 1986 action film Getting Even.
- Reunion Tower can also be seen in the 1987 film RoboCop, although the film is set in Detroit.
- In the 1997 made-for-TV movie Asteroid Reunion Tower is destroyed during a meteorite shower during the second half of the movie.
- Reunion Tower can be seen amongst the Dallas skyline in the King of the Hill episodes that involve the city.
- Reunion Tower can be seen in some episodes of the Walker, Texas Ranger TV series.
- Reunion Tower appears in the season finale of The Amazing Race 26.
- The tower can be seen in the 2011 film The Tree of Life.
- Reunion Tower can be seen in the season one episode of Halt and Catch Fire "High Plains Hardware".
- Reunion Tower can be seen in the 2023 film The Iron Claw.
- Reunion Tower can be seen in season 3, episode 13 "Murder Most Foul" of Sliders (TV series).

== Gallery ==
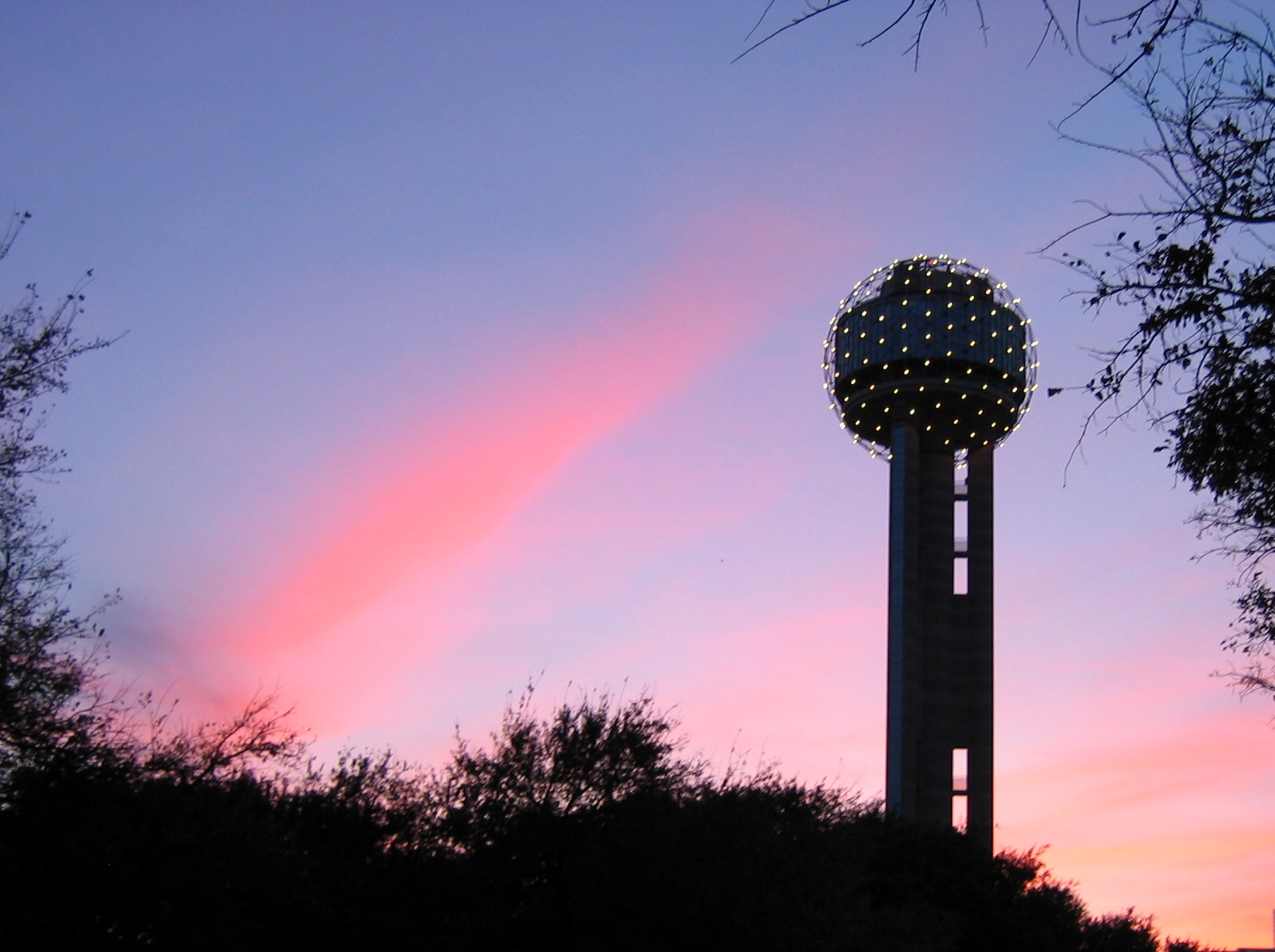

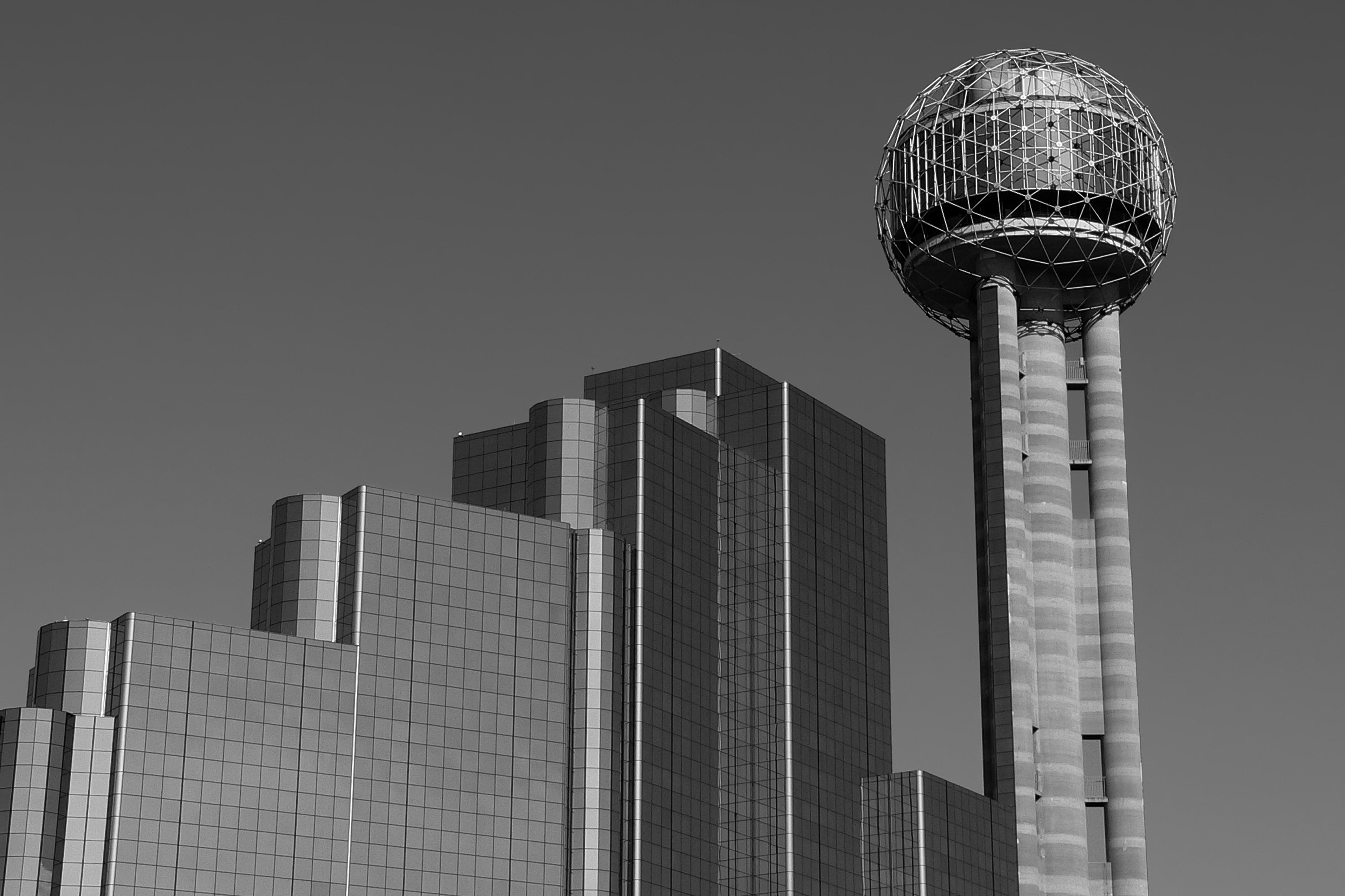

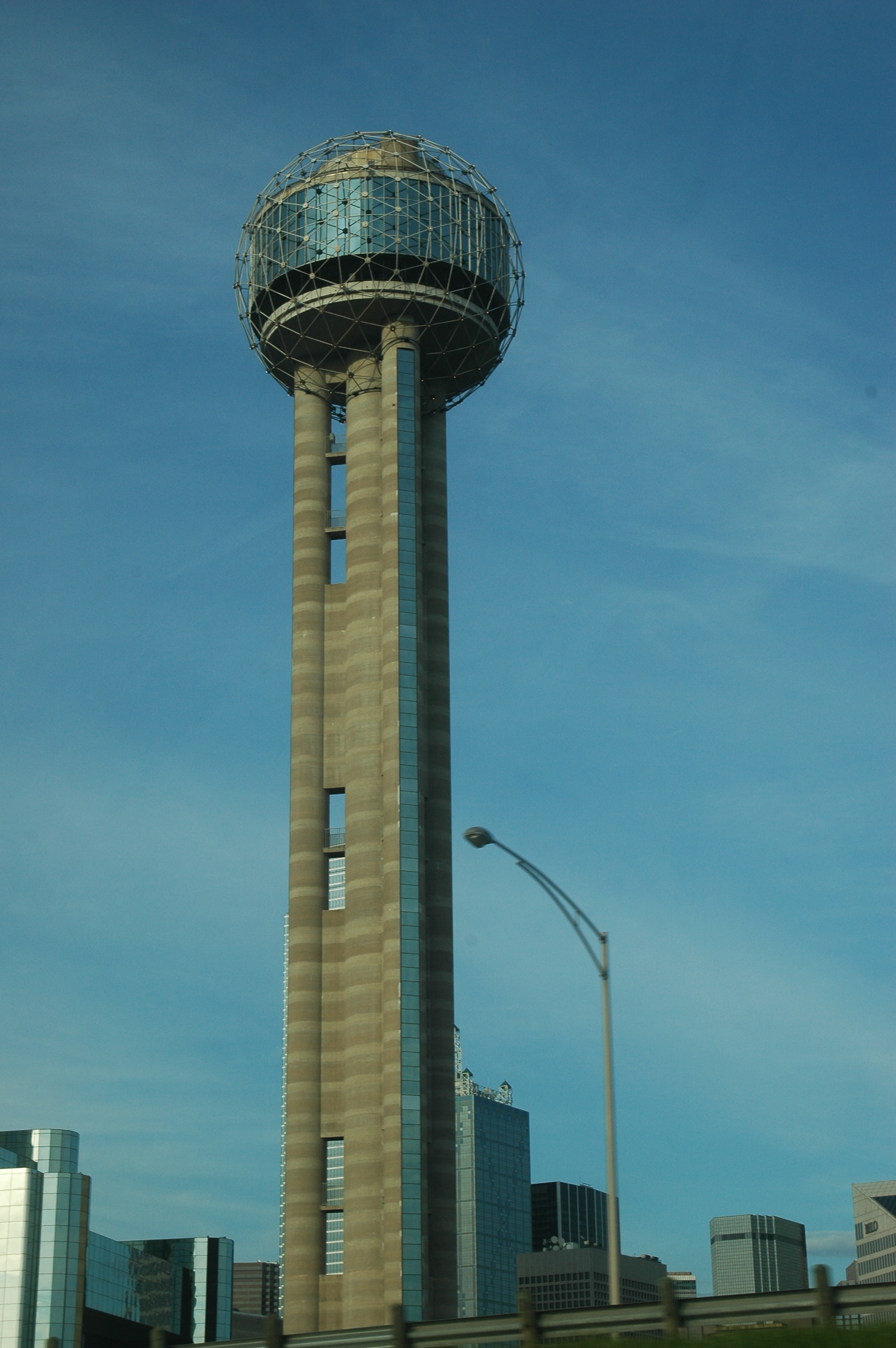

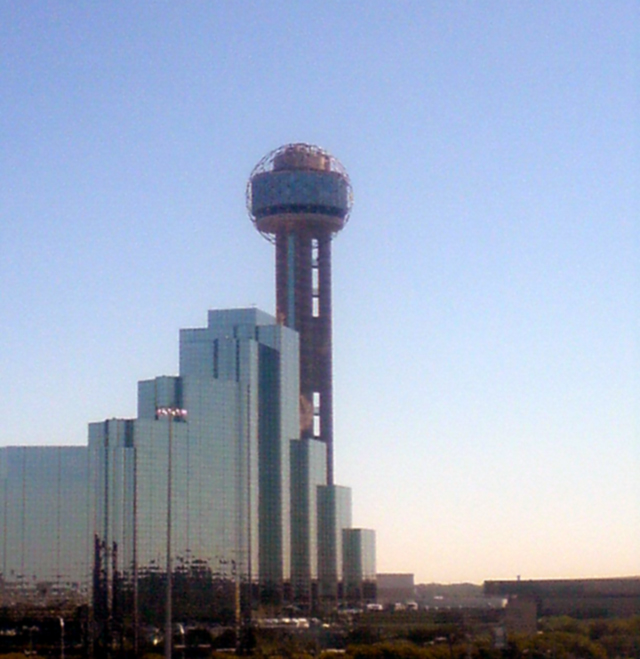

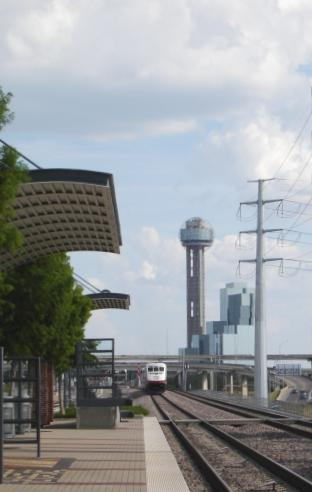

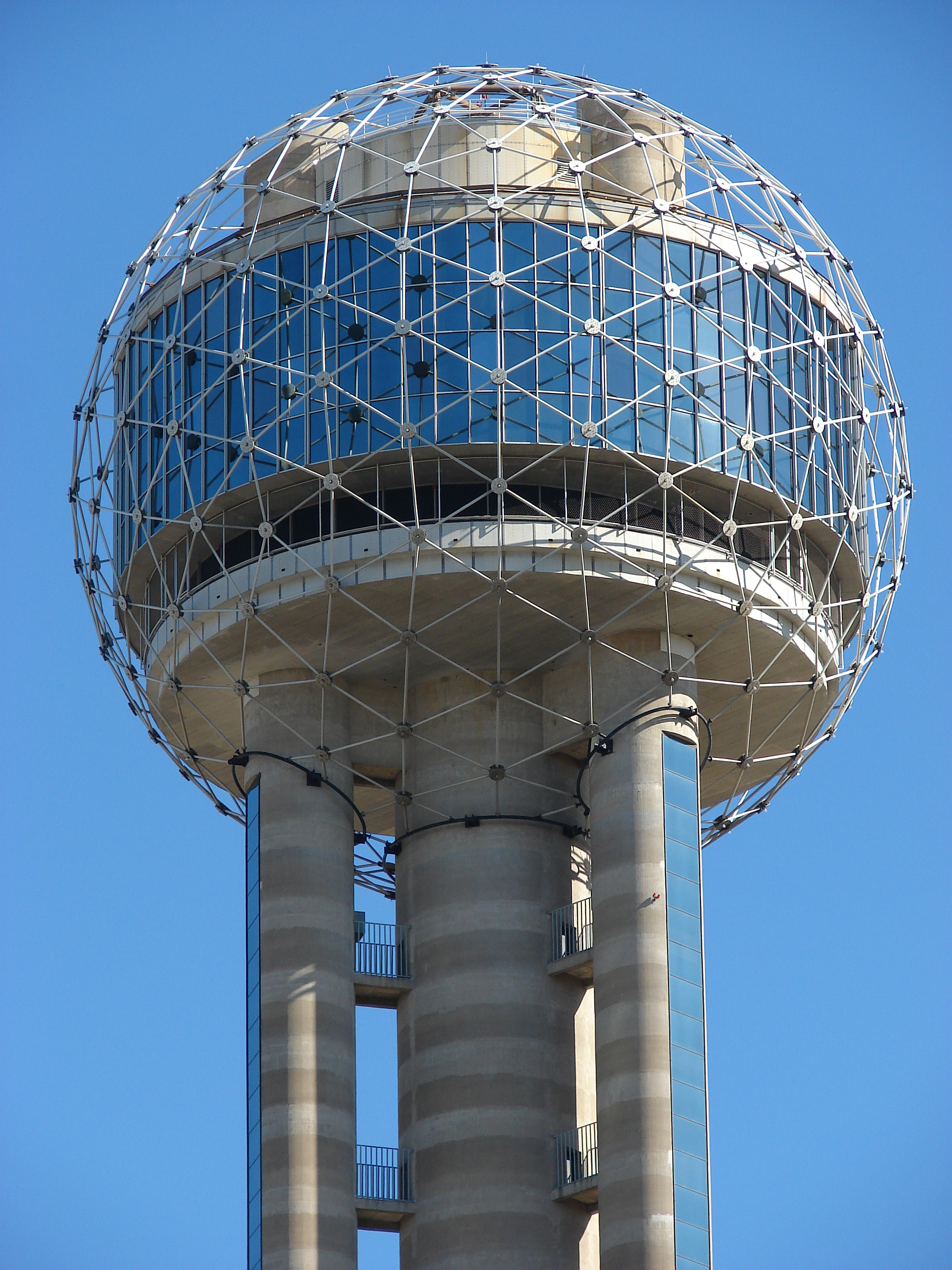

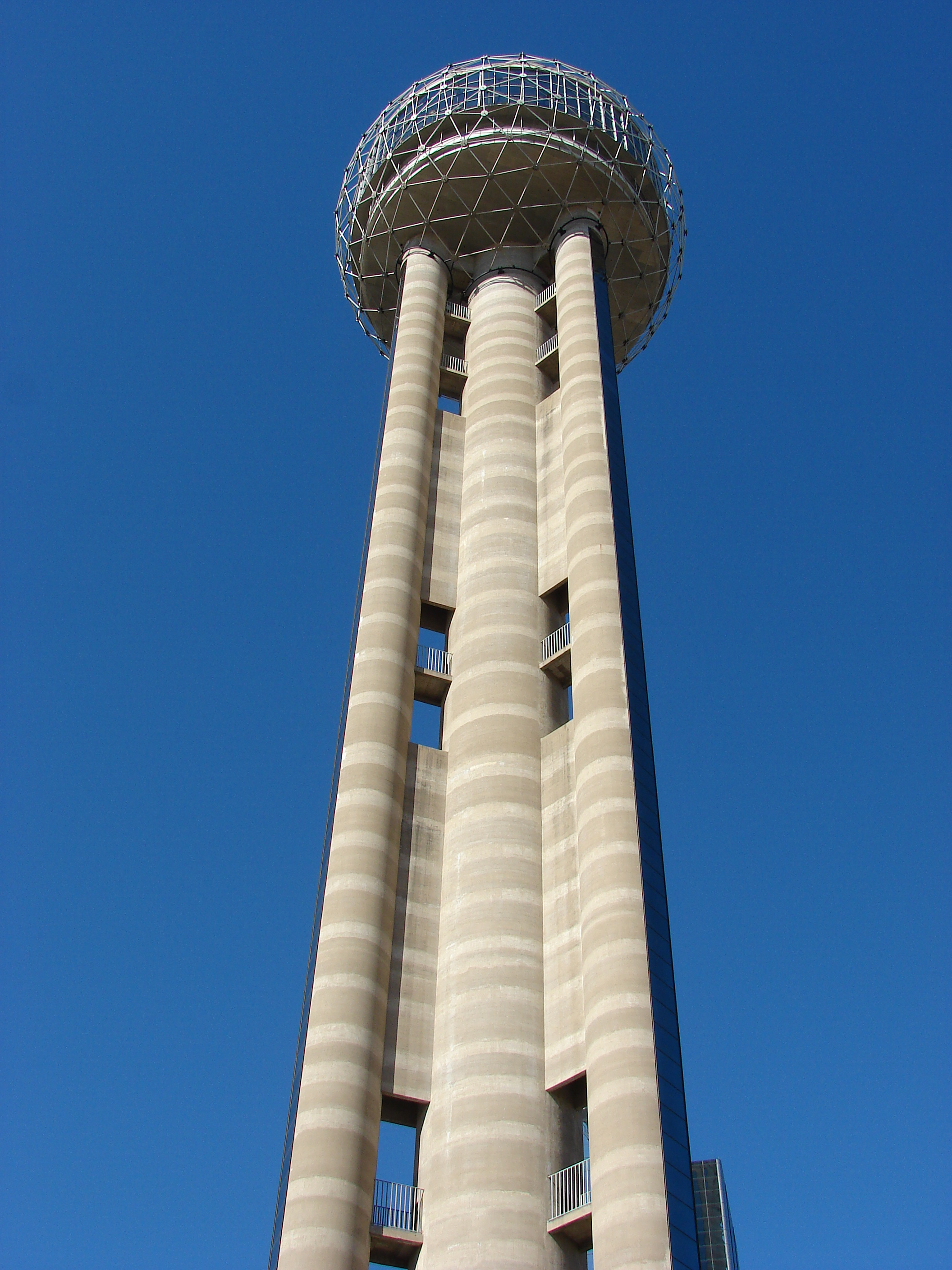

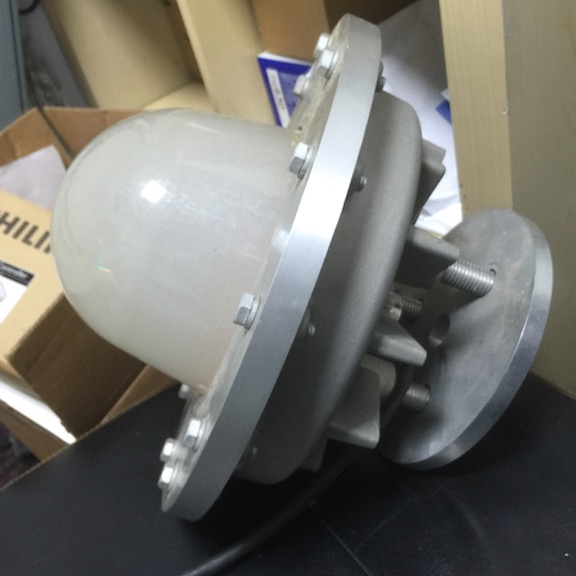

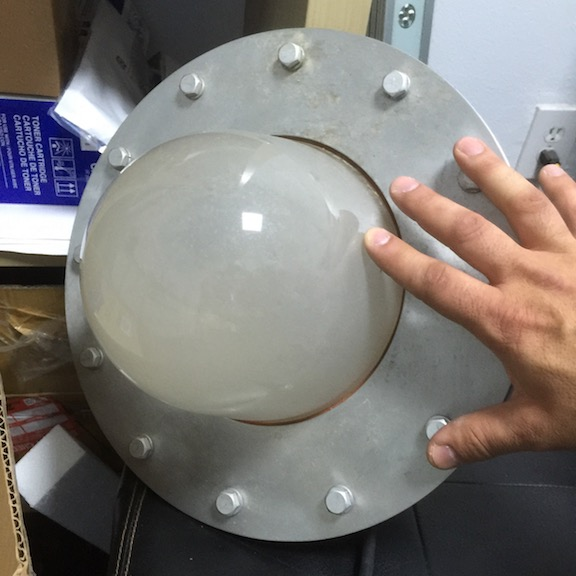

== See also ==
- List of tallest buildings in Dallas
