= Fort Worth Central Station =

Intermodal station in Fort Worth, Texas

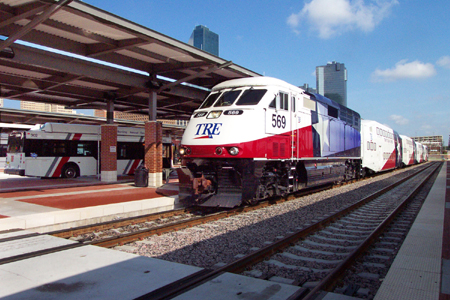
- TRE train arrives at Fort Worth Central Station

General information
- Location: 1001 Jones Street; Fort Worth, Texas; United States
- Coordinates: 32°45′10″N 97°19′35″W
- Owner: Trinity Metro
- Platforms: 1 side platform, 1 island platform
- Tracks: 3
- Train operators: Amtrak, Trinity Metro, TRE, TEXRail
- Connections: Greyhound Bus Lines; Trinity Metro: 1, 2, 5, 6, 11, 12, 46, 61X (M-F), 63X (M-F), 65X (M-F), 89, =Blue Line, Orange Line

Construction
- Structure type: At-grade
- Accessible: Yes

Other information
- Station code: Amtrak: FTW
- Fare zone: TRE West

History
- Opened: January 12, 2002

Passengers
- FY 2025: 136,888 (Amtrak)
- FY 2025: 534 (avg. weekday) ▲2.3% (TRE)

Services
| Preceding station | Amtrak | Following station |
|---|---|---|
| Terminus | Heartland Flyer | Gainesville toward Oklahoma City |
| Cleburne toward Los Angeles or San Antonio | Texas Eagle | Dallas toward Chicago |
| Preceding station | Trinity Railway Express | Following station |
| T&P Station Terminus | Trinity Railway Express | Trinity Lakes toward Dallas Union Station |
| Preceding station | Trinity Metro | Following station |
| T&P Station Terminus | TEXRail | North Side toward DFW Airport Terminal B |
Proposed services
| Preceding station | Amtrak | Following station |
|---|---|---|
| Terminus | Crescent Proposed Texas Section | Dallas toward New York |
Location

Fort Worth Central Station (Amtrak: FTW) is an intermodal transit center in Fort Worth, Texas. Located at the corner of 9th Street and Jones Street on the east side of Downtown Fort Worth, it serves two commuter rail lines (TEXRail and Trinity Railway Express), two Amtrak intercity rail lines (Texas Eagle and Heartland Flyer), and Greyhound intercity bus. It also serves as the main transfer center for Trinity Metro, Fort Worth's public bus system.

The station is the busiest Amtrak station in Texas by ridership, with 136,888 passengers in FY 2025. It is also the busiest Trinity Railway Express station in Tarrant County and the third-busiest overall.

== Station ==
=== Services ===
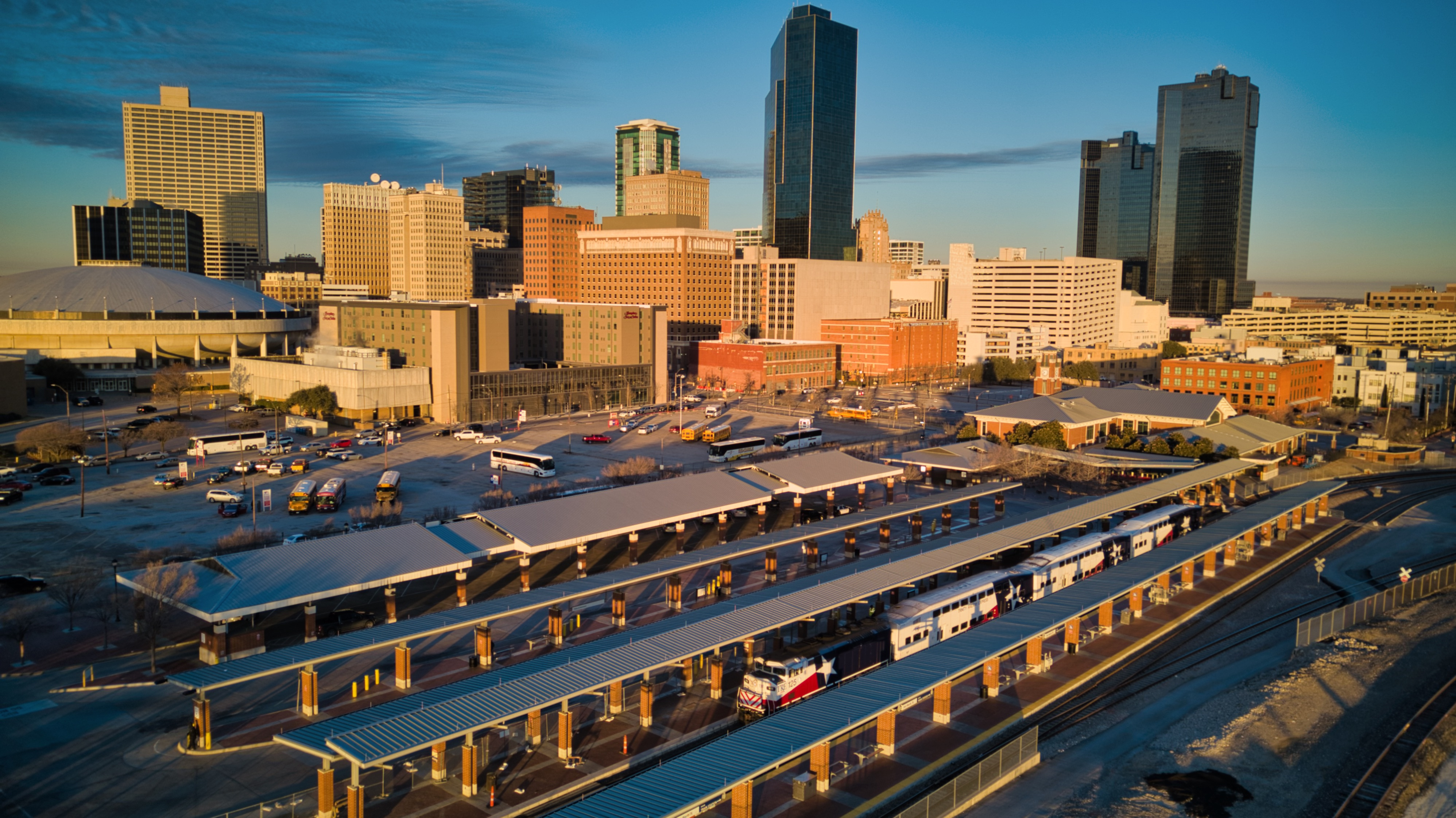
Aerial view of Fort Worth Central Station

The station has twenty bus bays and three rail tracks. TEXRail boards from Track 1 regardless of direction, while TRE boards from either Track 1 or 2. Amtrak trains board from Track 3. Greyhound buses board through a separate terminal on the opposite side of the building.

The station's interior contains restrooms, vending machines, a passenger service kiosk, and a Subway restaurant.

=== Exhibits ===
The station contains a set of five brick bas-reliefs depicting a former black-owned commercial district, which had existed at the station site from the Civil War to the 1940s. The reliefs were created by Denton-based artist Paula Blincoe Collins.

A restored interurban car, previously used by the Northern Texas Traction Company, is also on display.

== History ==
Prior to the station's opening, transit services operated without a unified hub in downtown Fort Worth. Local bus lines (then branded as The T) converged at a transit mall along Houston Street and Throckmorton Street, while Amtrak and Greyhound Lines serviced the Gulf, Colorado and Santa Fe Railroad Passenger Station on Jones Street.

In the 1990s, city leaders planned to create a unified transportation hub with the goal of encouraging train and bus usage, which would reduce pollution and traffic congestion. In 1991, the project received a $13.4 million federal grant due to the Intermodal Surface Transportation Efficiency Act. Original plans called for the historic Texas & Pacific Station to be renovated. However, the city ultimately decided to build a new station at the corner of 9th and Jones named Fort Worth Intermodal Transportation Center (abbreviated Fort Worth-ITC). This new location was selected because it was closer to both the central business district and local attractions such as Sundance Square.

On December 3, 2001, the Trinity Railway Express line (TRE) was extended from Richland Hills to T&P Station. TRE service included a stop at Fort Worth-ITC, though the station building was not completed until January 12, 2002.

On June 30, 2006, Greyhound Bus Lines began service to the station.

On January 10, 2019, TEXRail began service to the station.

On March 25, 2019, the Trinity Metro board of directors unanimously voted to rename Fort Worth-ITC to Fort Worth Central Station. The TRE announcement system continued to use the original name until the fall of 2024.

In June 2023, Amtrak applied for funding for a new rail corridor between Fort Worth and Meridian, Mississippi. The corridor would follow the Interstate 20 right-of-way and would be used for a branch of Amtrak's Crescent train, which currently provides service between New York City and New Orleans. Fort Worth Central would serve as the western terminus of the route.
