= Santa Fe Freight Building =

Historic building in Fort Worth, Texas, US

Coordinates: 32°45′00″N 97°19′29″W

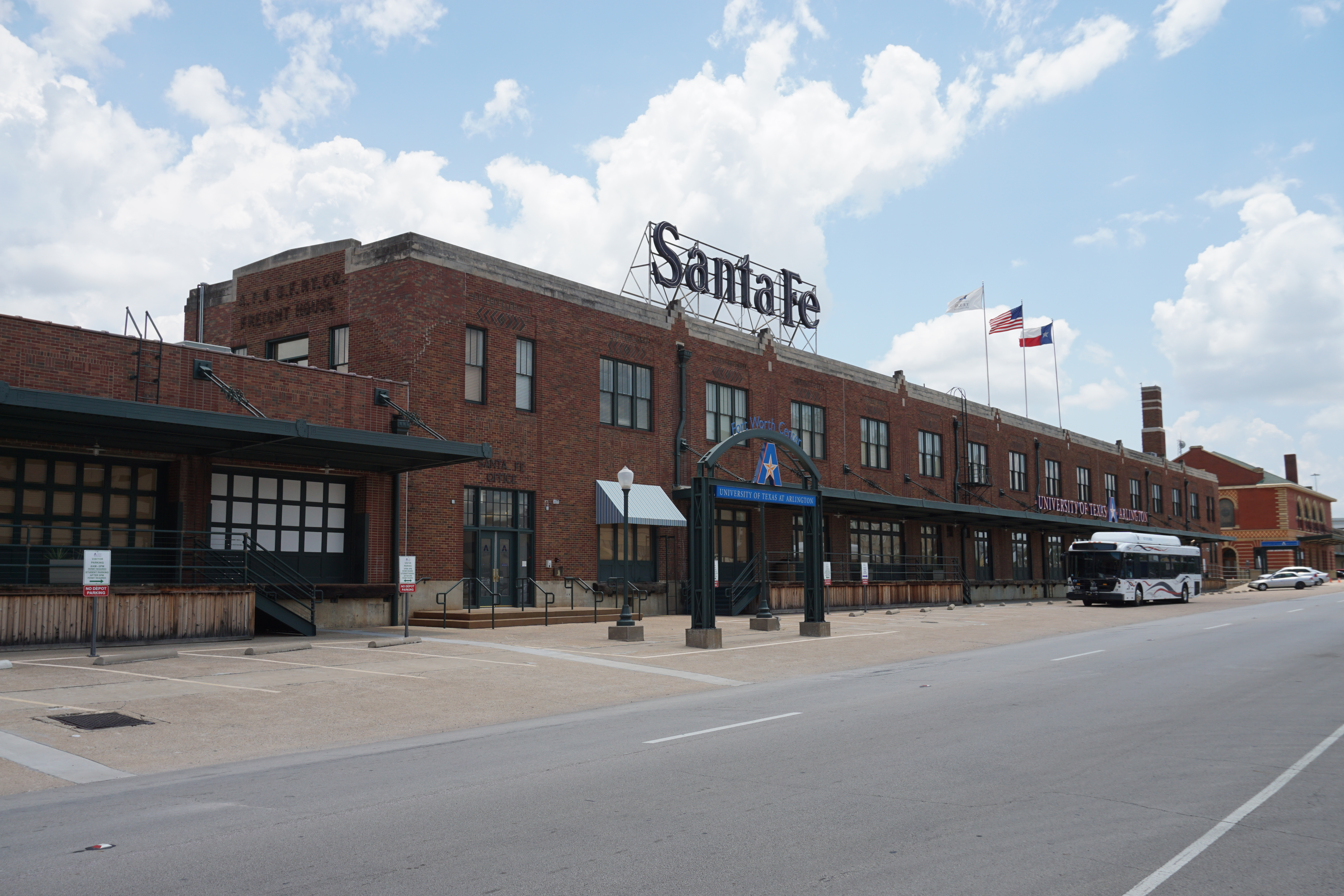
Santa Fe Freight Building in 2016

The Santa Fe Freight Building is a former freight depot in Fort Worth, Texas. Designed in the style of Art Deco known as PWA Moderne, it was built on the site of an older freight depot in 1938. Upon construction, it was jointly owned by the Atchison, Topeka and Santa Fe Railway and the Southern Pacific Company. Its first floor was a freight warehouse that also provided cold-storage capabilities while its second floor housed office space for the Santa Fe.

In the 1990s, the building had fallen into vacancy and was named one of 15 historic "highly significant endangered properties" in Fort Worth by its Historic and Cultural Landmarks Commission. The building was restored by local developers in 2002 and reopened as the Fort Worth Rail Market, an open market space that was ultimately transformed into restaurant and office space before the project was abandoned by 2005. In 2006, the University of Texas at Arlington (UTA) signed a lease to use the Santa Fe Freight Building as its Fort Worth satellite campus, spending approximately $1.2 million to redesign and renovate the building. It continues to serve as UTA Fort Worth, which has awarded over 3,500 total degrees and has expanded to include ten different degree programs since its establishment in 2007.

== Architecture ==
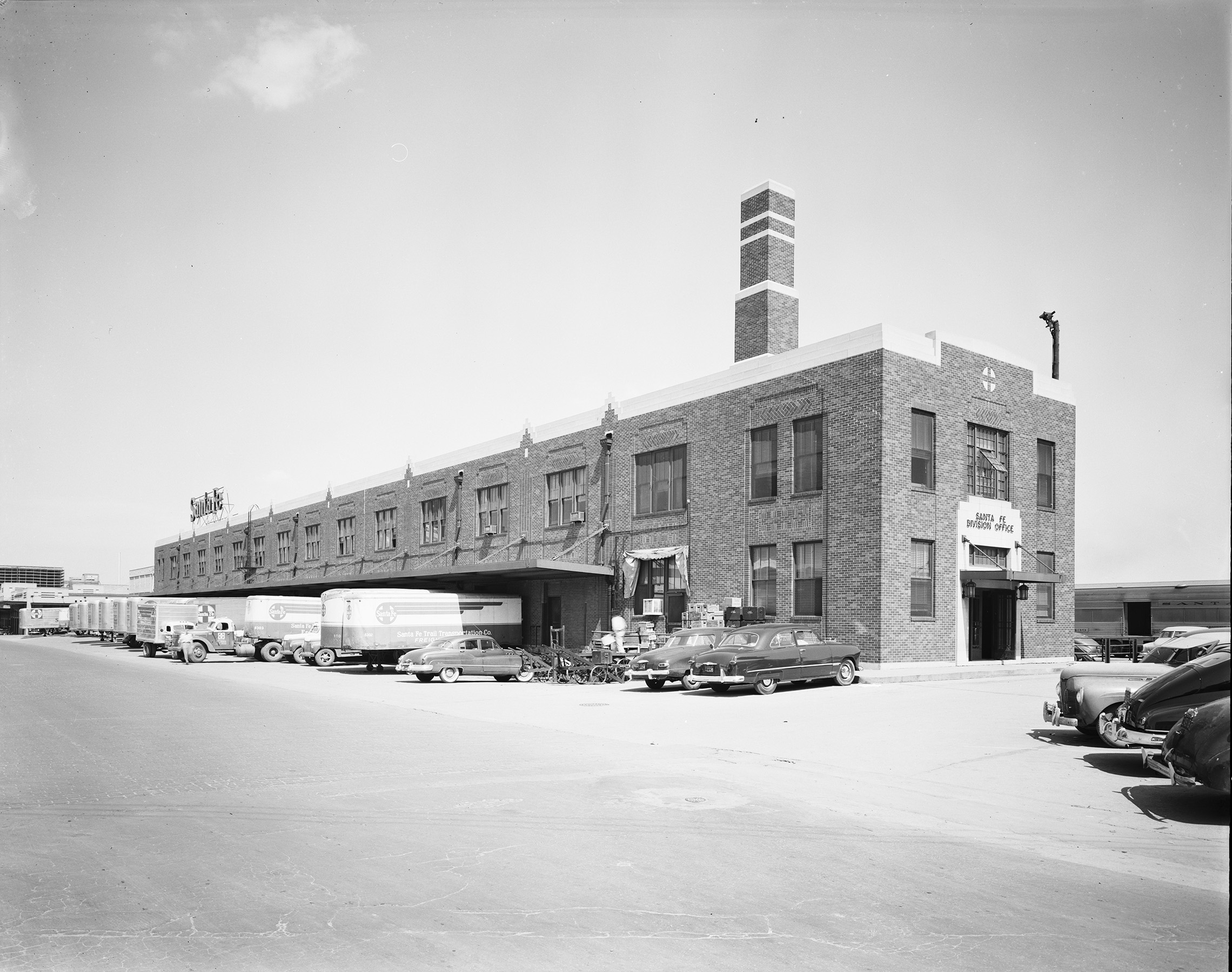
Santa Fe Freight Building, circa 1950

Erected in 1938 to replace an existing freight depot, the Santa Fe Freight Building was constructed during the stylistic phase of Art Deco known as PWA Moderne (PWA standing for the Public Works Administration), which combined elements of former architectural styles and was popular for both government and commercial projects. Due to a sudden boost of prosperity in 1920s, the city of Fort Worth emerged as a major center of Art Deco architecture, constructing dozens of new buildings in the 1920s and 1930s, many of which remain prominent features of the city's landscape. At the time of its construction, the Santa Fe Freight Building was noted for featuring extensive cold storage for perishable freight. The use of reinforced concrete, a key feature of Art Deco construction that allowed for larger buildings, was also noteworthy to contemporary commenters. Exterior features of the building are largely utilitarian (a hallmark of PWA buildings) but it does boast decorative elements such as a parapet and a neon sign.

The Santa Fe Freight Building is two stories in height and measures 327 feet (100 m) in length by 36 feet (11 m) in width. As originally designed, the first floor consisted of a freight warehouse that also included a cold-storage capabilities. The second floor housed office space for both the Atchison, Topeka and Santa Fe Railway's freight agent and its division superintendent.

== History ==
=== Freight depot ===
The Santa Fe Freight Building was built on the site of a former freight depot that stood between 12th and 14 Streets and east of Jones Street, which was torn down in 1937. That year, building of the new freight depot was bid out for $123,900, and construction was expected to take 10 months with 50-100 workers for most phases of the project. Construction was delayed a few days in July 1937 due to the Little Steel strike, and it was ultimately completed in May 1938. Together with the newly renovated Fort Worth Union Depot, the new freight depot was jointly owned by the Atchison, Topeka and Santa Fe Railway and the Southern Pacific Company. At the inauguration of its operation, there were 16 trains serving Fort Worth each day: eight run by the Santa Fe, four by the Southern Pacific, and four by the Chicago, Rock Island and Pacific Railroad.

In 1995, Fort Worth's Historic and Cultural Landmarks Commission recommended that the Santa Fe Freight Depot be designated one of 15 historic "highly significant endangered properties" in the city. By 1998, both the Santa Fe Freight Building and nearby Fort Worth Union Depot had become vacant. They were both bought by Fort Worth-based investor Shirlee Gandy that year, who proceeded to develop the Union Depot into an events venue to pair with the Ashton Hotel, which she also owned. After a long period of vacancy, the freight depot was restored by local developers in 2002.

=== Fort Worth Rail Market ===
A second phase for the Santa Fe Freight Building began in May 2002, as the city planned to convert it into an open market space christened the Fort Worth Rail Market that combined "specialty boutiques with fresh-produce stands and small restaurants". The Rail Market's first tenant was Hot Damn, Tamales; it also hosted Coffee Haus, Lone Star Wines, and Seafoodville, and was the first home of vegan restaurant Spiral Diner. However, Fort Worth city leaders grew increasingly concerned with the market's very low profit margins after just two years, observing that it was "hundreds of thousands of dollars in the red". Opinions as to why the market struggled so much financially were divided. Certain merchants laid the blame on the city administration and cited mismanagement as the primary cause. The manager of the project countered that he had the responsibility to safeguard public funds. The falling margins, combined with unexpectedly low public interest, eventually resulted in the Tax Increment Financing (TIF) commission approving a plan that would result in the conversion of "most of the space to offices or a large restaurant", which would reduce the annual losses by over 50%. This approach ultimately was not sustainable and the Fort Worth Rail Market would be abandoned completely by 2005.

=== UTA Fort Worth campus ===
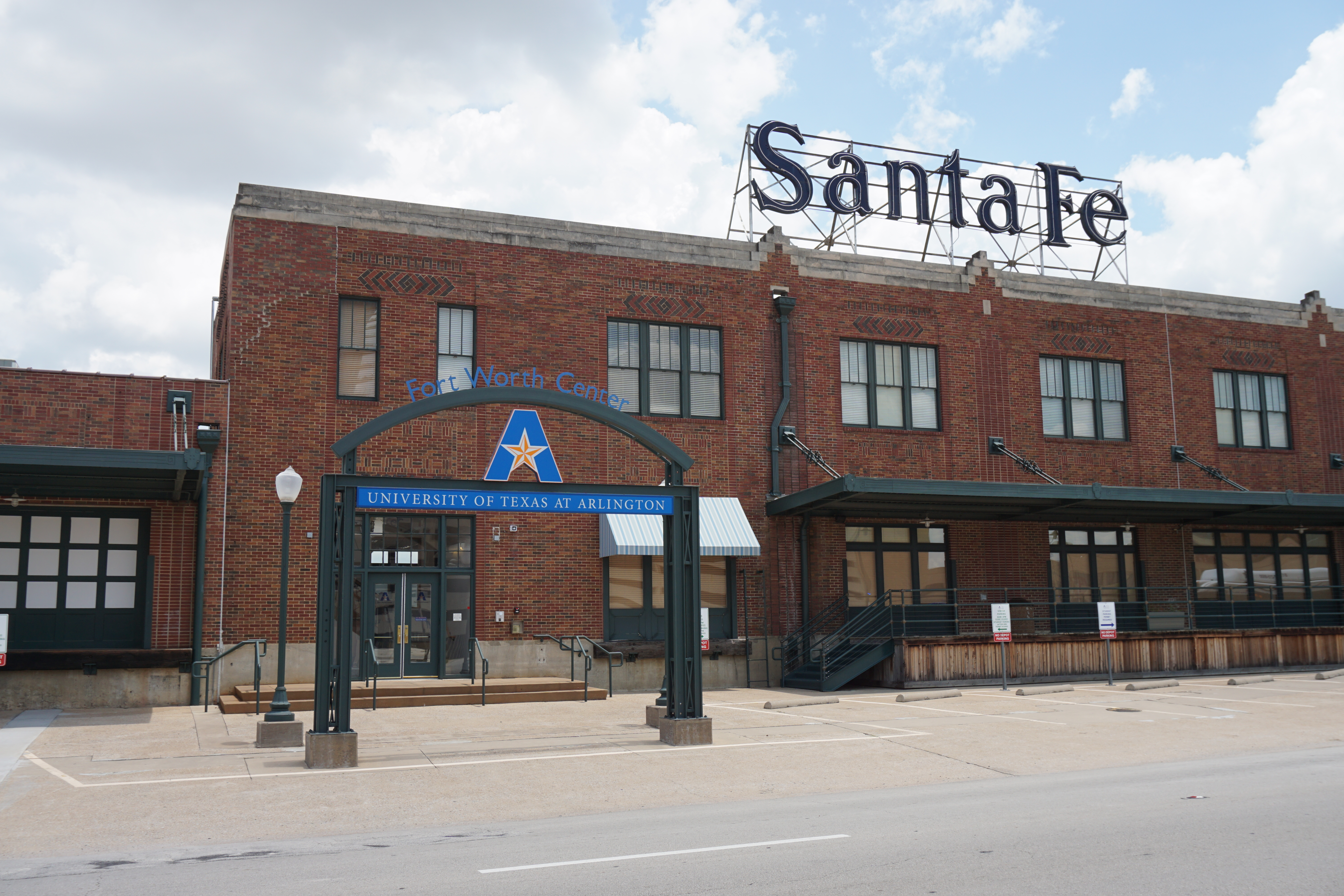
Santa Fe Freight Building in 2016, with UTA signage

In February 2006, after receiving approval from the University of Texas System Board of Regents, the University of Texas at Arlington (UTA) signed a 10-year lease to use the Santa Fe Freight Building as its Fort Worth satellite campus. After UTA spent approximately $1.2 million to redesign and renovate the building, it opened for classes as the Fort Worth Center on January 17, 2007. At its opening, the building measured roughly 21,600 square feet (2,010 m^{2}) that included eight classrooms and a library with over 40 computers.

Before acquiring the Santa Fe Freight Building, UTA had previously offered a Master of Business Administration (MBA) in Fort Worth since 2000, with classes first held at the UTA Research Institute in eastern Fort Worth. Since opening in 2007, UTA Fort Worth has awarded over 3,500 total degrees and has expanded to include ten different degree programs. Eight of these programs are at the graduate level and encompass business administration, criminology/criminal justice, health care administration, real estate, and social work. The other two programs offered are at the undergraduate level: a Bachelor of Social Work program and a Registered Nurse (RN) to Bachelor of Science in Nursing (BSN) program. UTA Fort Worth also offers professional development through its corporate education initiative.

== Sources ==
- Cohen, Judith Singer (1988). Cowtown Moderne: Art Deco Architecture of Fort Worth, Texas (1st ed.). Texas A&M University Press. ISBN 0-89096-313-4.
