= Cleburne Intermodal Transportation Depot =

Amtrak train station in Cleburne, Texas

Cleburne, TX
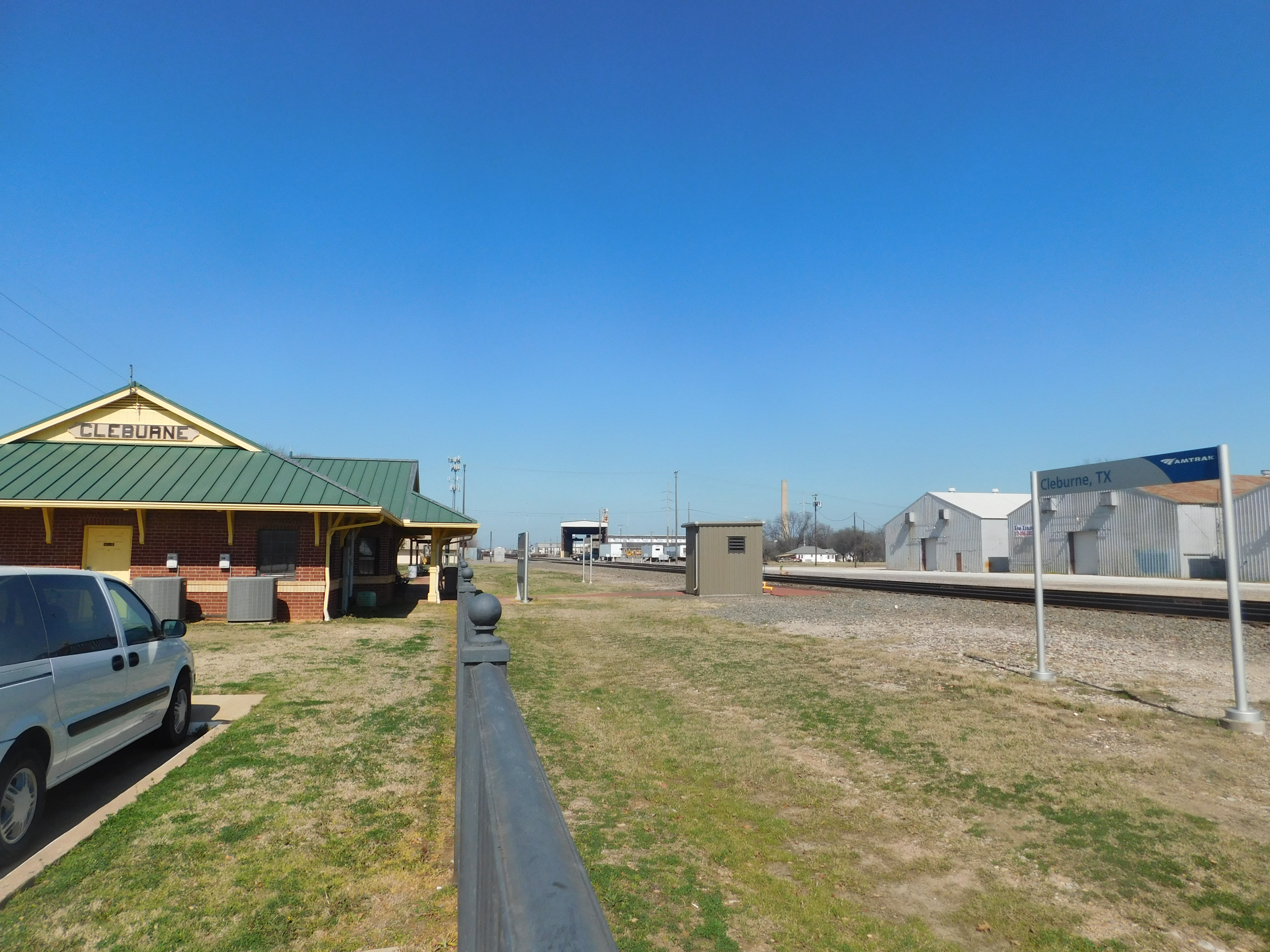
- Cleburne station, February 2017

General information
- Location: 206 North Border Street; Cleburne, Texas; United States
- Coordinates: 32°20′59″N 97°22′56″W
- Owner: City of Cleburne
- Line: BNSF Railway
- Platforms: 1 side platform
- Tracks: 2
- Connections: Cletran

Construction
- Parking: Yes, short-term
- Accessible: Yes

Other information
- Station code: Amtrak: CBR

History
- Opened: 1898
- Rebuilt: 1999

Passengers
- FY 2025: 4,192 (Amtrak)

Services
Preceding station	Amtrak	Following station
McGregor toward Los Angeles or San Antonio	Texas Eagle	Fort Worth toward Chicago
Former services
Preceding station	Amtrak	Following station
McGregor toward Laredo or Houston	Inter-American	Fort Worth toward Chicago
McGregor toward Houston	Lone Star	Fort Worth toward Chicago
Preceding station	Atchison, Topeka and Santa Fe Railway	Following station
Joshua toward Purcell	Gulf, Colorado and Santa Fe Railway Main Line	Rio Vista toward Galveston
Terminus	Cleburne – Paris	Keene toward Paris
Location

The Cleburne Intermodal Transportation Depot is an Amtrak train station in Cleburne, Texas, United States.

== History ==
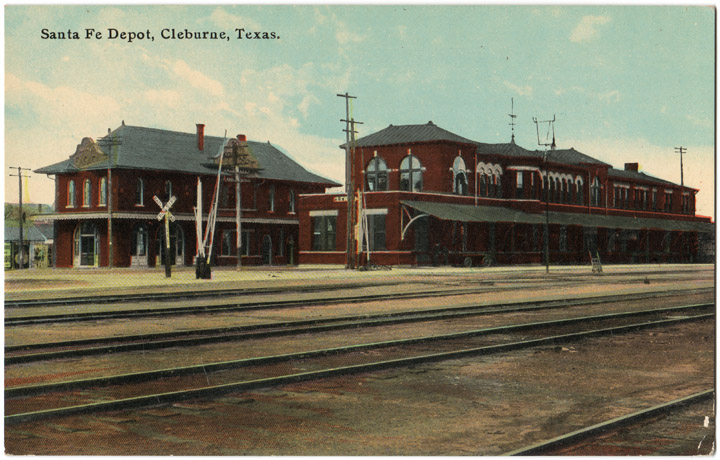
Trinity and Bravos Valley Railway and Atchison, Topeka and Santa Fe Railway depots in 1910

For many years, Cleburne was the site of a major locomotive backshop of the Santa Fe Railroad, and many shop buildings can be seen on the east side of the track. The 1898 two-story brick depot was scaled down to one floor and ultimately demolished during the 1990s to make way for a road expansion project.

Cleburne became the northern end of the Trinity and Brazos Valley Railway in 1904, with the portion from Teague now abandoned.

Cleburne's current intermodal station, built in 1999, serves Amtrak trains and is the office for Cletran, the local bus transit. In recent history, the station has become less prestigious and the surrounding buildings have become mostly abandoned. The station is unstaffed, and all tickets must be purchased in advance.
