= Fort Worth Union Depot (1900–2002) =

Former railway station in Fort Worth, Texas

Fort Worth, TX
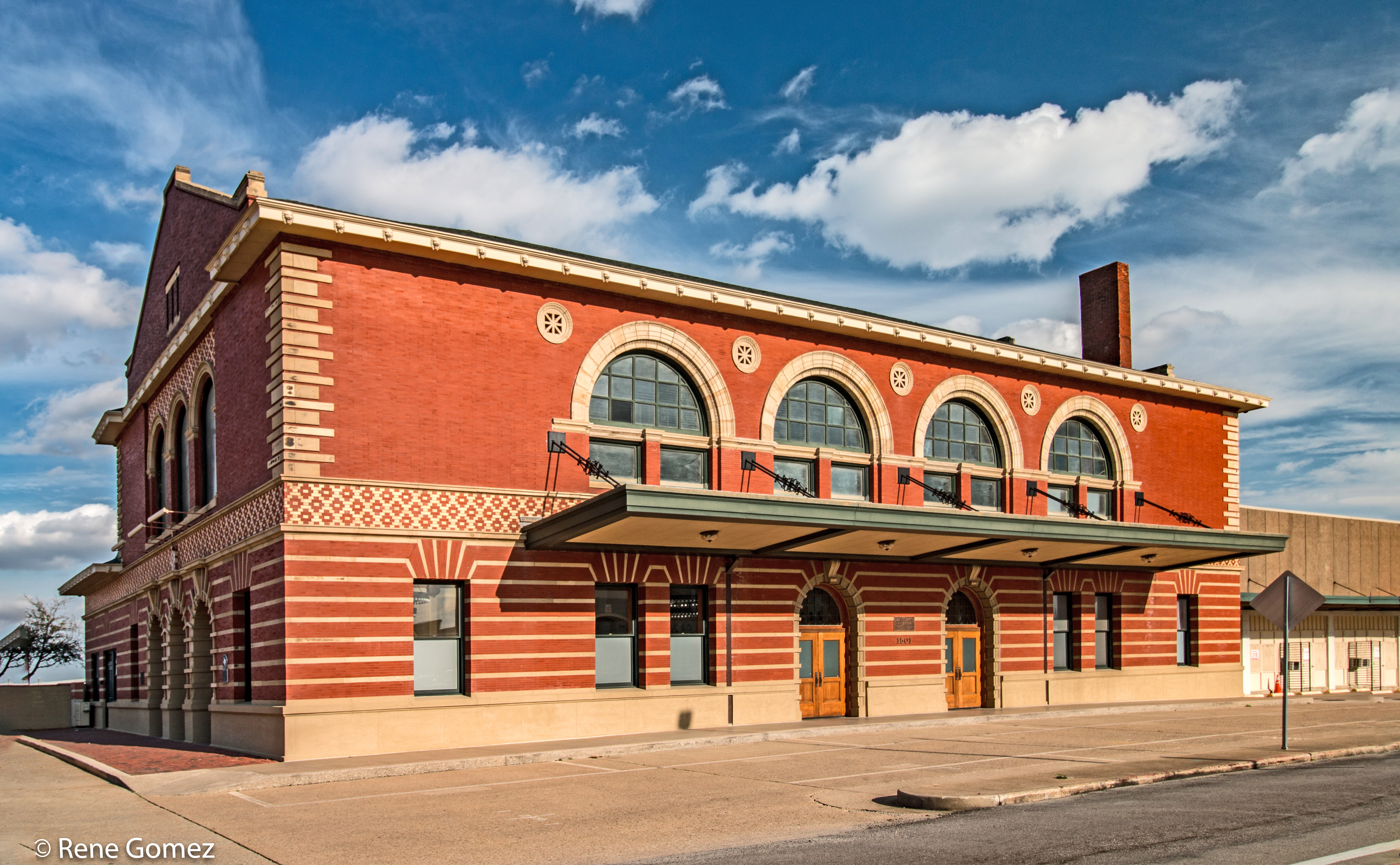
- Santa Fe Depot in 2017

General information
- Location: 1501 Jones Street, Fort Worth, Texas; USA
- System: inter-city rail station

History
- Opened: 1900
- Closed: 2002
- Rebuilt: 1938

Former services
Preceding station	Amtrak	Following station
Terminus	Heartland Flyer	Gainesville toward Oklahoma City
Cleburne toward Los Angeles or San Antonio	Texas Eagle	Dallas toward Chicago
Cleburne toward Laredo or Houston	Inter-American	Dallas toward Chicago
Cleburne toward Houston	Lone Star	Gainesville toward Chicago
Dallas Terminus	Lone Star	Gainesville toward Chicago
Preceding station	Atchison, Topeka and Santa Fe Railway	Following station
Justin toward Purcell	Gulf, Colorado and Santa Fe Railway Main Line	Crowley toward Galveston
Primrose toward San Angelo	San Angelo – Dallas	Dallas Terminus
Preceding station	Chicago, Rock Island and Pacific Railroad	Following station
Irving toward Teague	Teague – Minneapolis	Saginaw toward Minneapolis
- Gulf, Colorado and Santa Fe Railroad Passenger Station
- U.S. National Register of Historic Places
- Interactive map of Gulf, Colorado and Santa Fe Railroad Passenger Station
- Location: 1501 Jones Street, Fort Worth, Texas
- Coordinates: 32°44′57″N 97°19′26″W
- Area: 0.1 acres (0.040 ha)
- Built: 1899
- Architectural style: Beaux Arts
- NRHP reference No.: 70000760
- Added to NRHP: October 15, 1970
Location

Fort Worth Union Depot is a former passenger train station in Fort Worth, Texas. From 1971 to 2002, it was used as Fort Worth's Amtrak station.

The depot was built by the Gulf, Colorado and Santa Fe Railroad (a subsidiary of the Atchison, Topeka and Santa Fe Railway, also known as the "Santa Fe") in 1900 and renovated in 1938. The station was added to the National Register of Historic Places in 1970.

In 2002, following the opening of Fort Worth Intermodal Transportation Center (now Fort Worth Central Station), train service to the station ceased. The station, as well as the adjacent Santa Fe Freight Building, was passed into private ownership. It is currently used as an 800-seat special event venue under the name Ashton Depot.

== Prior service ==
Alongside the Santa Fe, the station was serviced by the Chicago, Rock Island and Gulf Railway (a subsidiary of Chicago, Rock Island and Pacific Railroad, also known as "Rock Island"), the St. Louis–San Francisco Railway (also known as the "Frisco"), and the Southern Pacific Railroad.

Notable passenger trains servicing the station included the Kansas Cityan (Chicago to Dallas), the Texas Chief (Chicago to Galveston), and the Twin Star Rocket (Dallas to Minneapolis).

== See also ==
- National Register of Historic Places listings in Tarrant County, Texas
- Recorded Texas Historic Landmarks in Tarrant County
