= Knoll Trail station =

Commuter rail station in Dallas, Texas

Knoll Trail
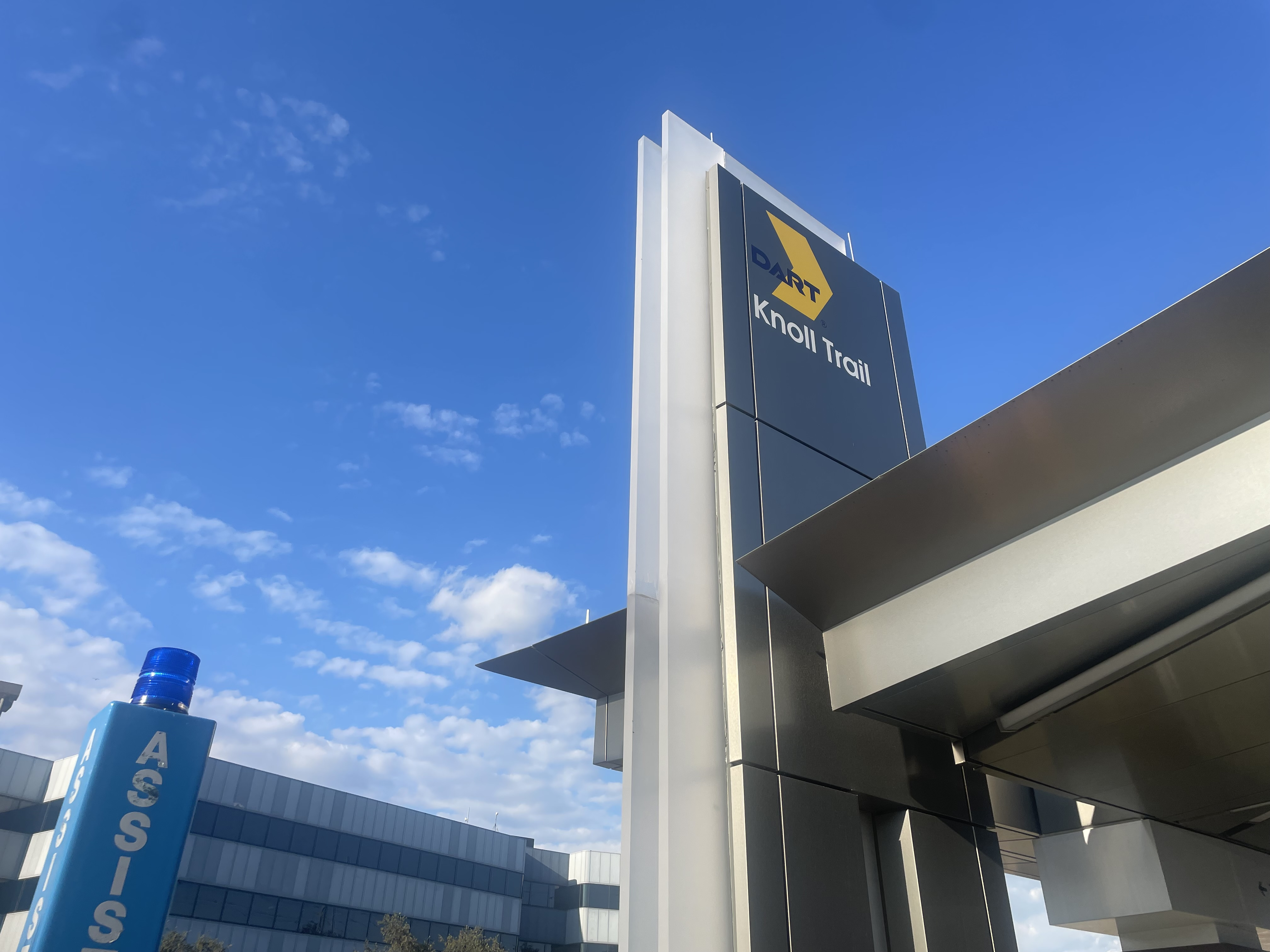

General information
- Location: 15292 Knoll Trail Drive; Dallas, Texas
- Coordinates: 32.962369°N 96.818822°W
- System: DART rail
- Owner: Dallas Area Rapid Transit
- Platforms: 2 side platforms
- Tracks: 2
- Connections: DART: 236; Addison Orbit

Construction
- Structure type: At-grade
- Accessible: Yes

History
- Opened: October 25, 2025; 9 months ago

Services
| Preceding station | DART | Following station |
|---|---|---|
| Addison toward DFW Airport Terminal B | Silver Line | UT Dallas toward Shiloh Road |
Location

Knoll Trail station is a DART Silver Line commuter rail station in Dallas, Texas.

The station is located in Far North Dallas near the intersection of Arapaho Road and the Dallas North Tollway. It serves adjacent apartment and office complexes, as well as Prestonwood Town Center. Unlike most DART stations, Knoll Trail does not have a dedicated parking lot.

The station is decorated with an "urban refuge" theme.

== History ==
In 1990, Dallas Area Rapid Transit (DART) purchased a former St. Louis Southwestern Railway corridor between Fort Worth and Plano for a future commuter rail line.

In 2006, the city of Dallas proposed a development plan for the Far North Dallas segment of the corridor. The plan proposed three stations on the segment, including one at Knoll Trail. The other two Far North Dallas stations (located at Preston Road and Coit Road) would later be removed from the plan, but Knoll Trail was retained.

In 2017, developers for the Dallas Midtown project (located 2.5 miles (4.0 km) south of the rail line at the former site of Valley View Center) proposed an elevated transit system connecting the project and Knoll Trail station.

The station opened, alongside the rest of the Silver Line, on October 25, 2025.

In 2026, the town of Addison held a referendum on exiting the DART system, which if successful would force the closure of Addison station. As a replacement, the town government established a microtransit service, dubbed Addison Orbit, that would provide transit to Knoll Trail; additionally, DART announced that Addison's bus routes would be divided between Knoll Trail and Prestonwood Town Center if a pullout occurred. The pullout election ultimately failed; however, Addison Orbit service remains available, including at Knoll Trail.
