= Far North Dallas =

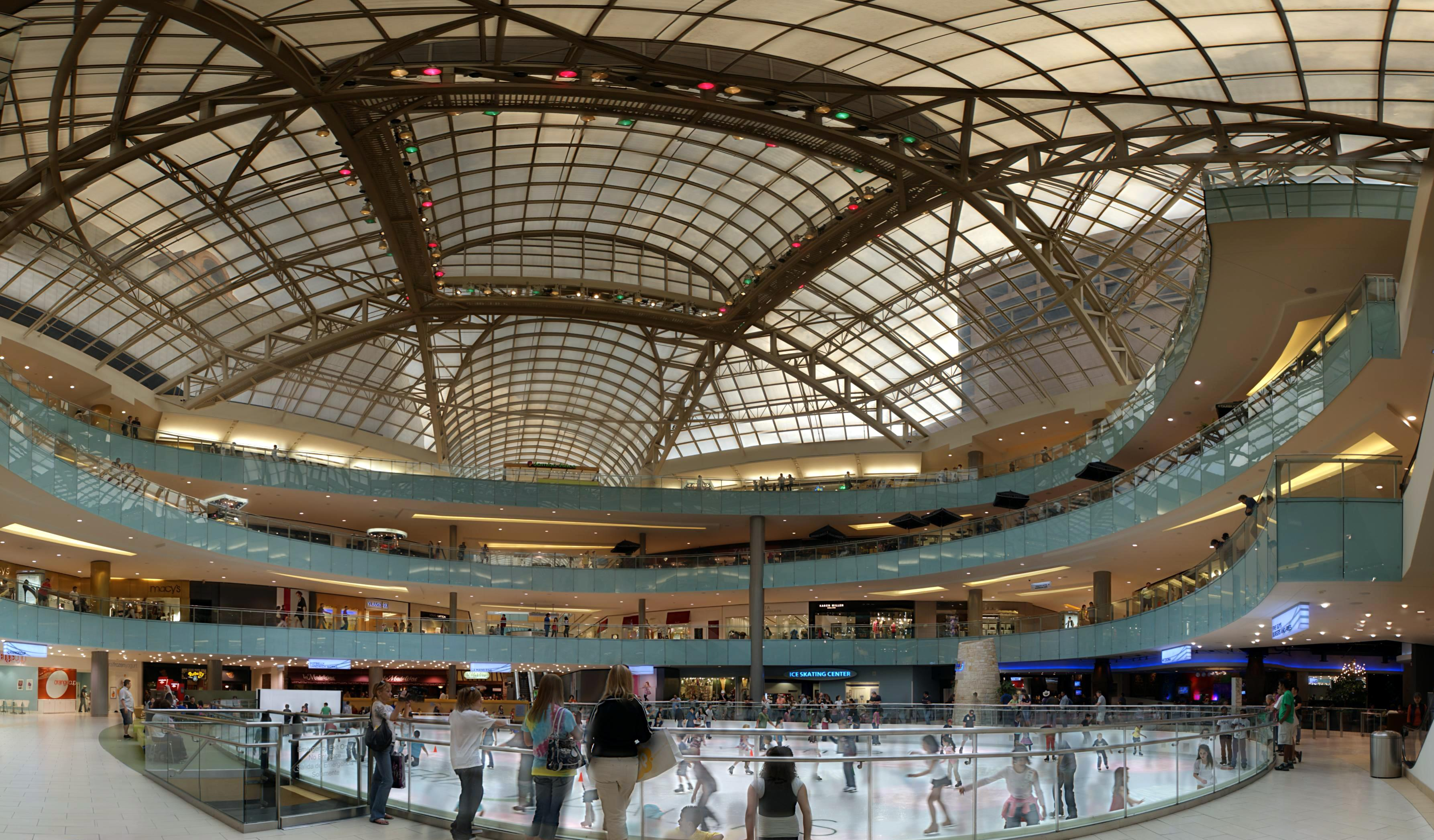
- Galleria in Far North Dallas.

- Location in Dallas Far North Dallas North Dallas
- Country: United States
- State: Texas
- Counties: Collin, Dallas, Denton
- City: Dallas
- Elevation: 630 ft (190 m)

Population (2016)
  - Total: 165,719
- ZIP codes: 75240, 75243, 75248, 75252, 75254, 75287
- Area codes: 214, 469, 972

Far North Dallas is the section of the city of Dallas, Texas which extends north of the Lyndon B. Johnson Freeway and south of the President George Bush Turnpike.

Far North Dallas is part of North Dallas but is viewed as a distinct area. The area has strong social, economic, and political ties to inner suburbs of Dallas, like Addison (West), Farmers Branch (Southwest), Richardson (East), Carrollton (Northwest), and Plano (Northeast).

Far North Dallas region is the only one in the city of Dallas that spans more than one county. The south-central portion of Far North Dallas, which is the largest section, lies within Dallas County, the northeastern portion is in Collin County, which is the second-largest section, and the northwestern portion is in Denton County, which is the smallest section.

== Neighborhoods ==
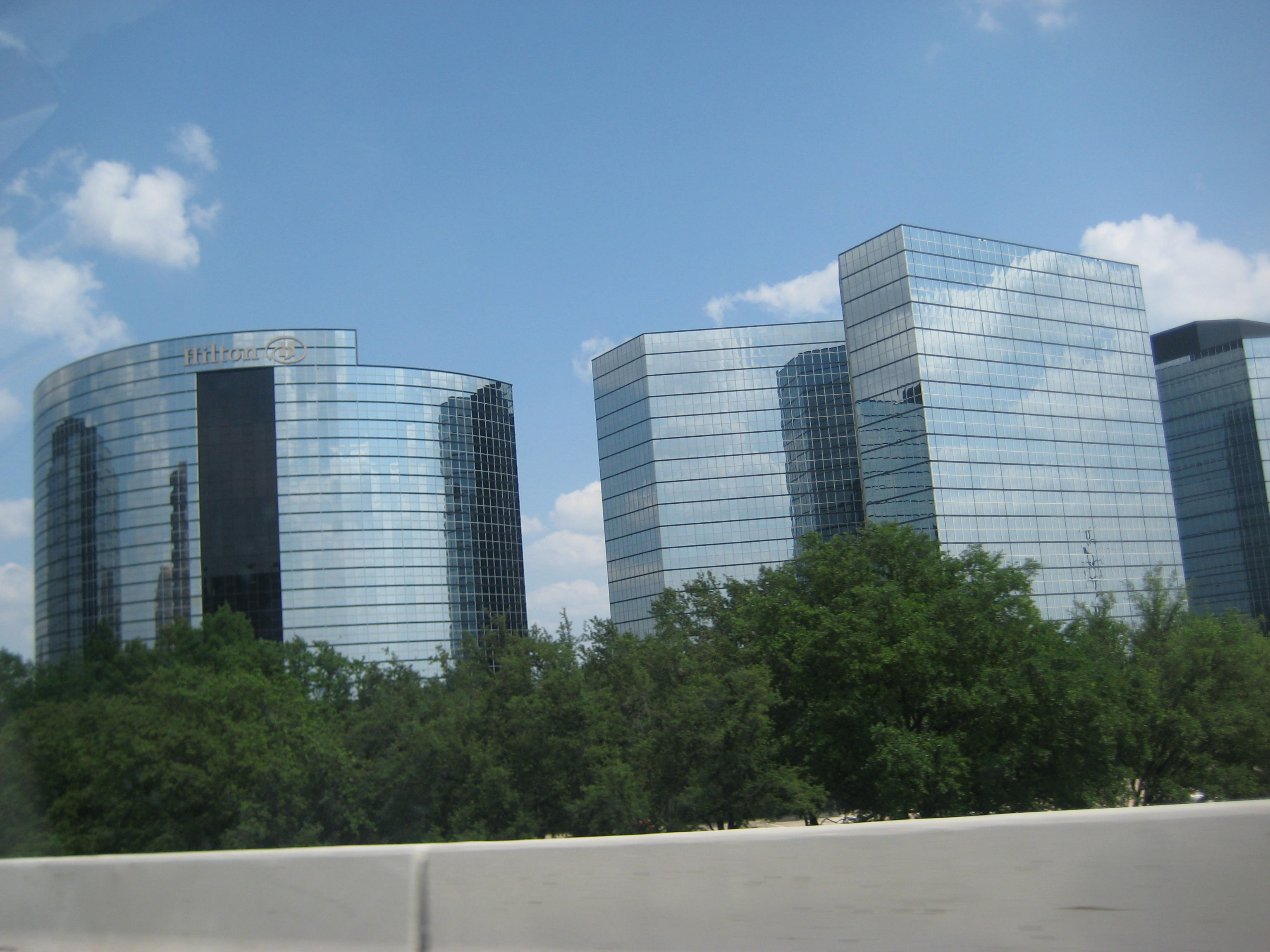
Corporate offices and hotels between North Dallas and Far North Dallas, near the Lyndon B. Johnson Freeway

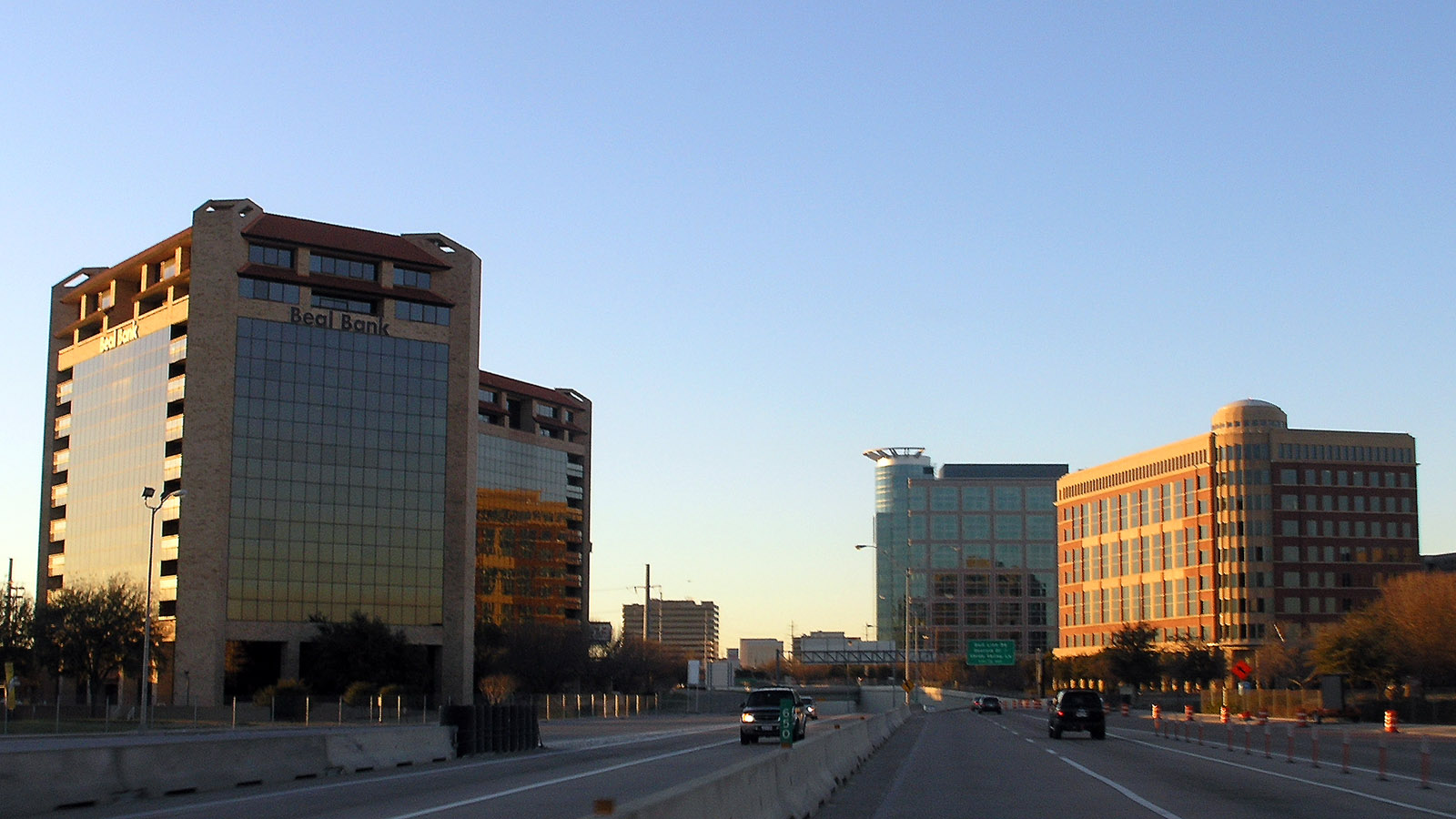
Buildings around the intersection of the Dallas North Tollway and Arapaho Road in Far North Dallas region. The cluster is part of the Platinum Corridor, the buildings on the right are in the town of Addison and the buildings on the left are in Far North Dallas

The following neighborhoods are generally considered part of or closely connected with Far North Dallas; however, some of them may not be located entirely within Far North Dallas or may be considered parts of Far North Dallas by some and not others.

- Bent Tree
- Briar Ridge
- Chalfont Place
- Chimney Hill
- Cobblestone Square
- Country Brook
- Estates West
- Frankford Creek Estates
- Frankford Meadows
- Haymeadow
- Highland Creek
- Highlands North
- Hillcrest Manor
- Jackson Highlands
- Lakes of Bent Tree
- Le Louvre
- Meadow Glen
- Moss Creek
- Northwood Hills
- Oak Tree
- Oakdale
- Park Central
- Parkway Lake Estates
- Pepperwood Estates
- Preston Creek
- Preston Fairways
- Preston Green
- Preston Highlands
- Preston North
- Preston Port Estates
- Preston Trail
- Prestonwood
- Prestonwood on the park (POPNA)
- Regency Park
- Renner
- Spring Creek
- Timberglen
- University Place
- Valley View
- Whispering Springs
- Williamsburg on Preston
- Willow Falls
- Willow Greene

== Shopping ==
- Galleria Dallas

== Education ==
=== Secondary ===
The Collin County portion of Far North Dallas is served by the Plano Independent School District, zoned to Plano West Senior High School. Portions of Far North Dallas in Dallas County are served by the Richardson Independent School District, zoned to J. J. Pearce High School or Richardson High School. The Denton County portion of Far North Dallas is served by the Carrollton-Farmers Branch Independent School District, and students are zoned to R. L. Turner High School or Newman Smith High School.

=== Colleges and universities ===
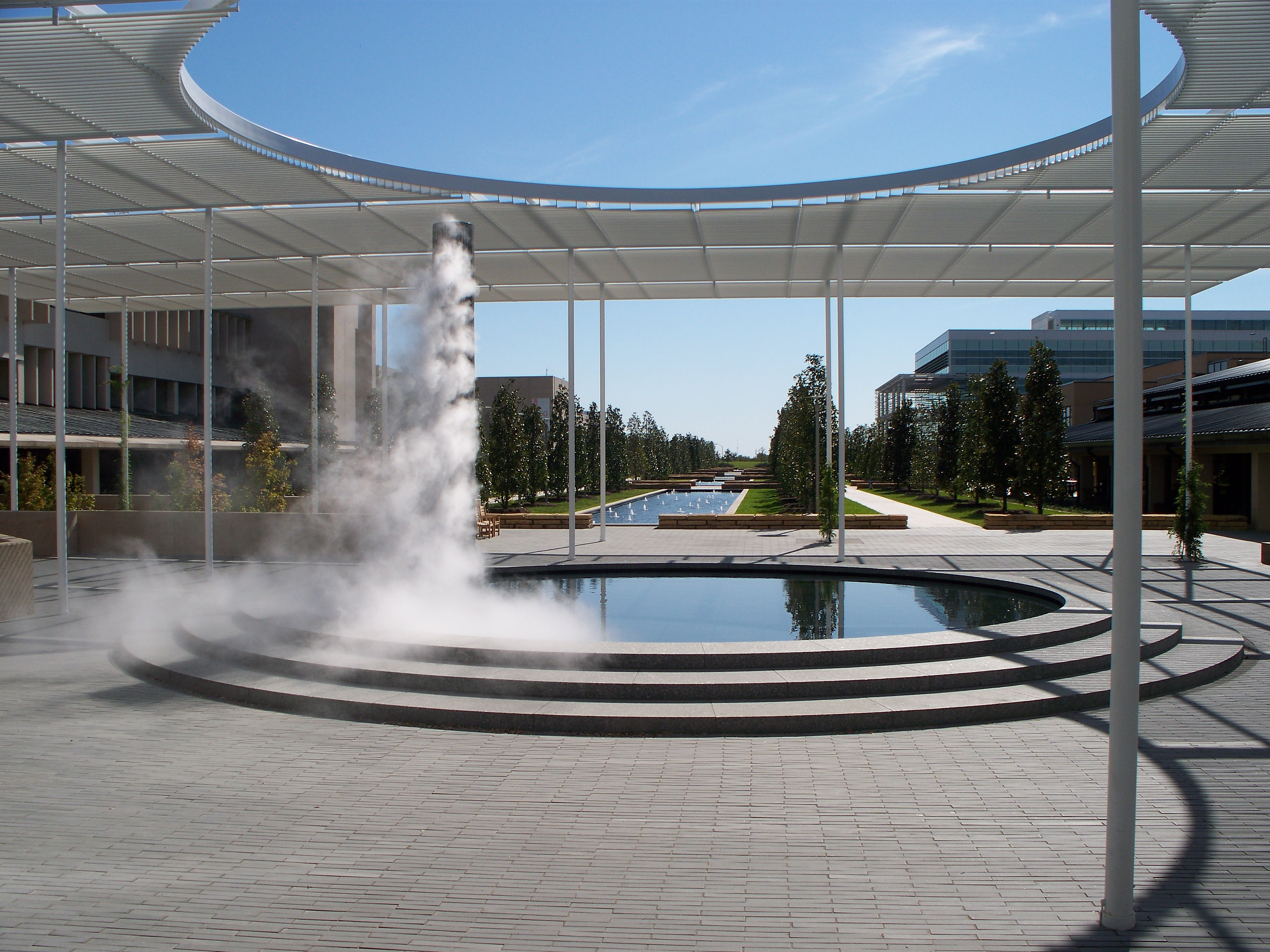
Campus Mall at The University of Texas at Dallas

- The University of Texas at Dallas (UTD), part of the state public University of Texas System, is located in the city of Richardson, is adjacent to Far North Dallas, and is in the heart of the Telecom Corridor. UT Dallas, or UTD, is renowned for its work in combining the arts and technology, as well as for its programs in engineering, computer science, economics, international political economy, neuroscience, speech and hearing, pre-health, pre-law and management. The university has many collaborative research relationships with UT Southwestern Medical Center. UT Dallas is home to approximately 31,750 students.
- Dallas College Richland Campus, part of Dallas College, is located in nearby Lake Highlands. The campus was founded in 1972 and is the largest campus in Dallas College, featuring nearly 22,000 students. Richland is the only community college to receive the Malcolm Baldrige National Quality Award.
- Dallas College Brookhaven Campus, part of Dallas College, is located near Far North Dallas. Brookhaven opened in 1978, making it Dallas College's newest campus, featuring more than 13,000 students.
- Texas A&M's TAMU-Dallas campus (the Texas AgriLife Research and Extension Center at Dallas) is also located in Far North Dallas. TAMU-Dallas is the home of the Urban Living Laboratory, which is a research and urban lifestyle community built with state-of-the-art green technologies.

== Dallas Jewish community ==
Dallas hosts the state's largest Jewish community with population estimates of 75,000 people out of the state's estimated Jewish population of around 220,685 people. Some large Orthodox shuls are Ohev Shalom, Shaare Tefilla, Ohr HaTorah, and Toras Chaim.

=== Far North community ===
The Far North community of the Dallas Jewish community has by far the largest population of Orthodox Jews. The Far North Jews live within an eruv containing the entire area of Far North Dallas.

== Libraries ==
The area is served by three branches of the Dallas Public Library system:

- Fretz Park Branch Library
- Renner Frankford Branch Library
- Timberglen Branch Library

== Government ==
Far North Dallas is split between Dallas City Council Districts 11 and 12, represented by Bill Roth and Cara Mendelsohn, respectively.

== Transportation ==
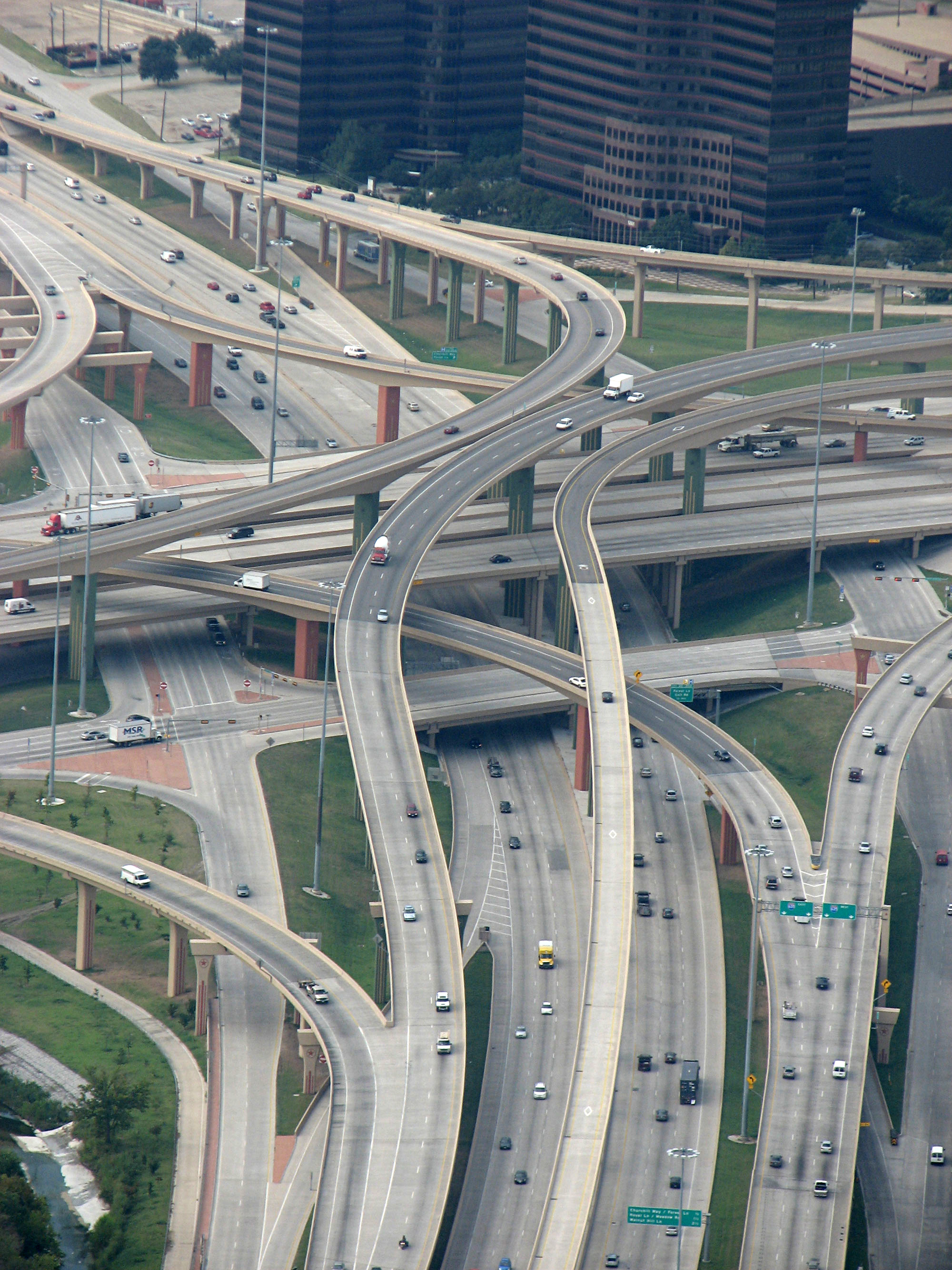
The Central Expressway and I-635 interchange in North Dallas, commonly known as the High Five Interchange.

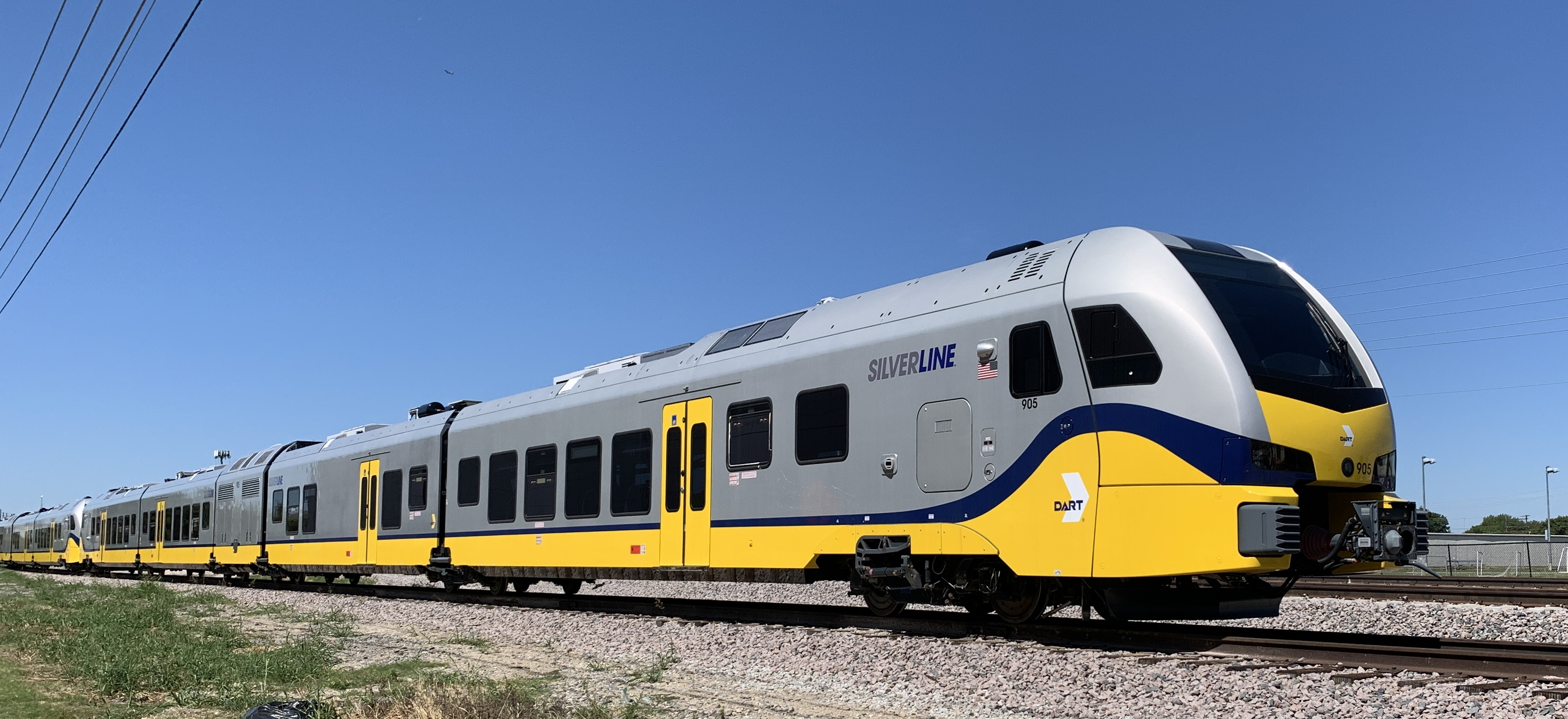
Silver Line (DART) connecting Far North Dallas with the rest of Dallas and the metropolitan area

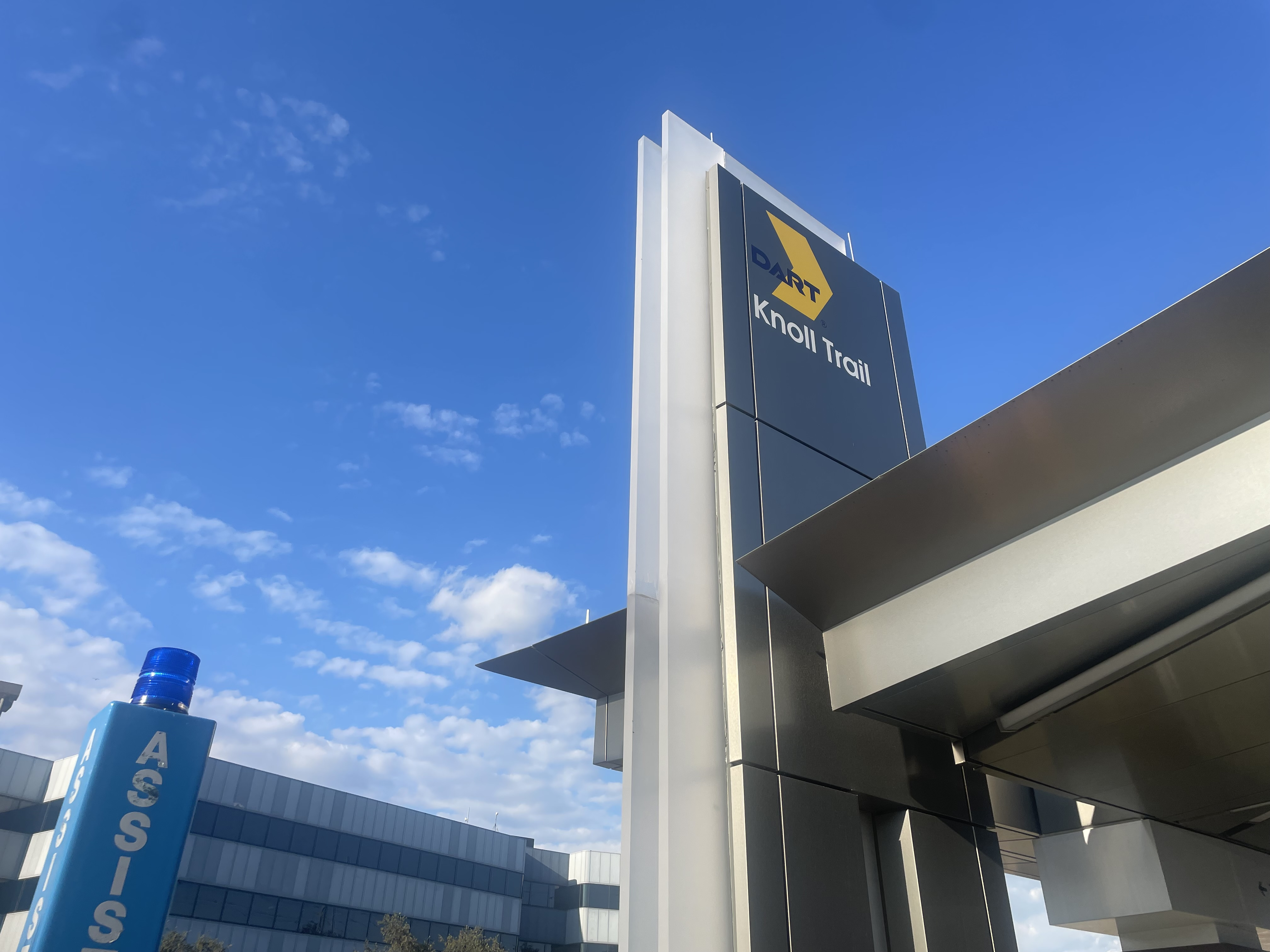
Knoll Trail station, the train station that serves Far North Dallas

As the majority of North Dallas was developed in the late 20th century, the primary mode of local transportation is the automobile and the area has a low density compared with neighborhoods built in the early 20th century.

Efforts made by the City of Dallas and Dallas Area Rapid Transit to increase the availability of alternative modes of transportation received varying degrees of support from Far North Dallas residents.

Plans to build a commuter or light rail line through the Far North Dallas area along the "Cotton Belt" (the St. Louis Southwestern Railway) met opposition from residents and local organizations in the early 2000s.

=== Light rail ===
In 2018, prior to the start of construction on the Silver Line, DART cancelled the construction of two of the three stations located in Far North Dallas, one on Coit Road and the other on Preston Road, over local community opposition.

In 2019, construction began on the railway plan, which opened in 2025 after delays from the COVID-19 pandemic. Knoll Trail Station is the only station on the line located in Far North Dallas, although Addison station and UT Dallas station are nearby.

=== Highways ===
- Dallas North Tollway runs north/south.
- U.S. Highway 75 (Central Expressway) runs northeast/southwest.
- Interstate 635
- Belt Line Road
- President George Bush Turnpike

=== Thoroughfares ===
- Arapaho Road
- Coit Road
- Frankford Road
- Hillcrest Road
- Midway Road
- Preston Road
- Spring Valley Road

=== Air ===
Addison Airport, a general aviation airport, is adjacent to Far North Dallas in Addison.

== See also ==
- North Dallas
