= Silver Line (DART) =

Hybrid rail service in Texas, United States

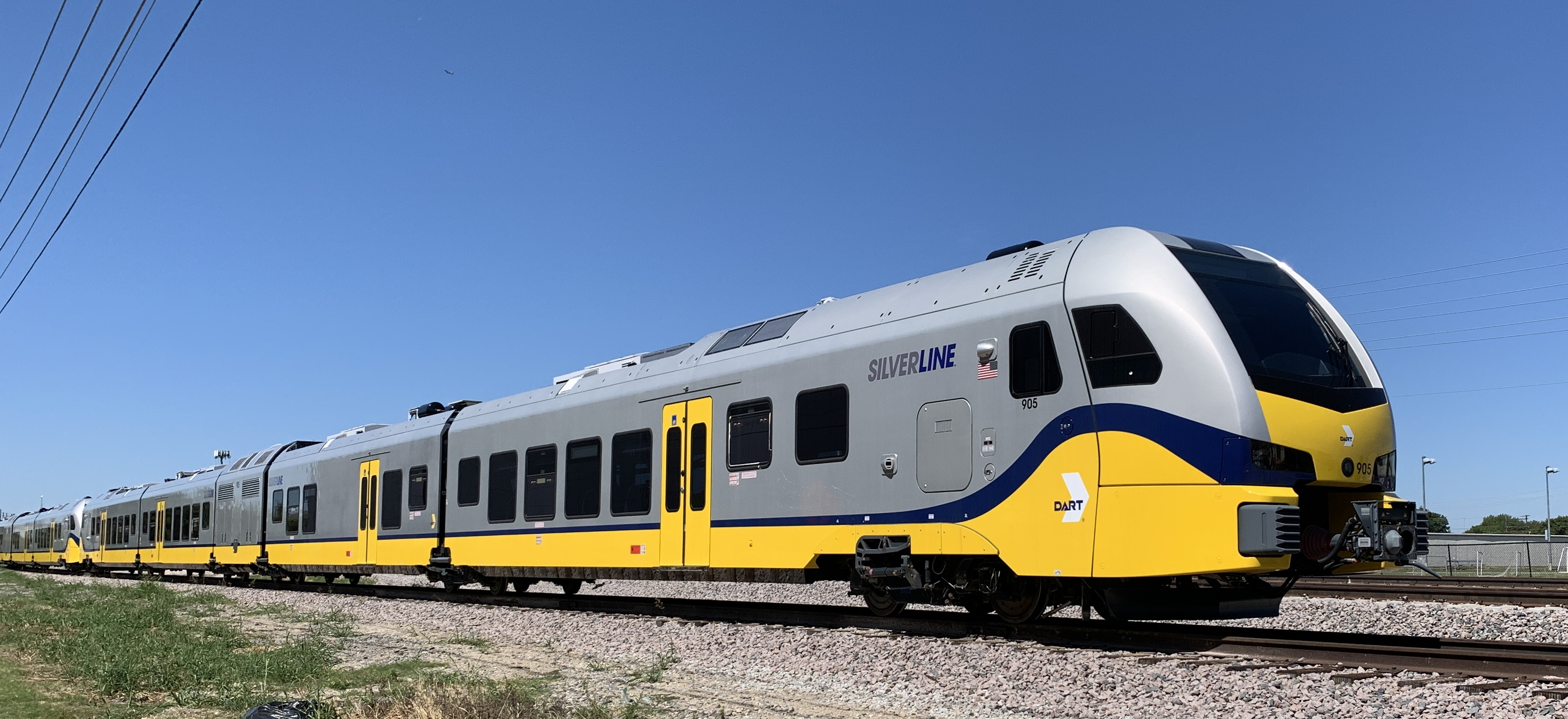
- Silver Line vehicle in testing near Shiloh Road station

Overview
- Other name: Cotton Belt Rail Line
- Status: Operational
- Owner: DART
- Locale: Tarrant County, Dallas County, and Collin County Texas, USA
- Termini: DFW Airport Terminal B (west); Shiloh Road (east)
- Stations: 10
- Website: DART Silver Line

Service
- Type: Hybrid rail
- System: DART rail
- Services: 1
- Operator(s): Herzog Transit Services (Operations & ROW Maintenance); Stadler (Rolling Stock Maintenance)
- Depot: Shiloh Road station Equipment Maintenance Facility
- Rolling stock: 8 Stadler FLIRT

History
- Opened: October 25, 2025; 10 months ago

Technical
- Line length: 26 mi (41.84 km)
- Track length: 67.7 mi (108.95 km)
- Number of tracks: 2
- Character: Commuter rail on shared freight line
- Track gauge: 4 ft 8 1/2 in (1,435 mm) standard gauge
- Operating speed: 70 mph (110 km/h) (top); ~29 mph (50 km/h) (average)
Route map
Silver Line highlighted in silver

The Silver Line, also known as the Cotton Belt Rail Line, is a 26-mile (42 km) hybrid rail service in Tarrant, Dallas, and Collin counties and in the U.S. state of Texas operated by Dallas Area Rapid Transit (DART). The line provides service from Dallas's northern suburbs of Plano, Richardson, Addison, and Carrollton to Dallas/Fort Worth International Airport Terminal B.

According to DART, the Silver Line is "designed to provide a high-speed, reliable transit option for residents and commuters with connections to the existing and planned transit systems" and aims to improve transit travel times by providing an alternative to congested roadway networks.

The working name for the project, the Cotton Belt Rail Line, came from the St. Louis Southwestern Railway, commonly known as the Cotton Belt, which previously owned the line. DART purchased the right-of-way in 1990 for future transit use.

== History ==
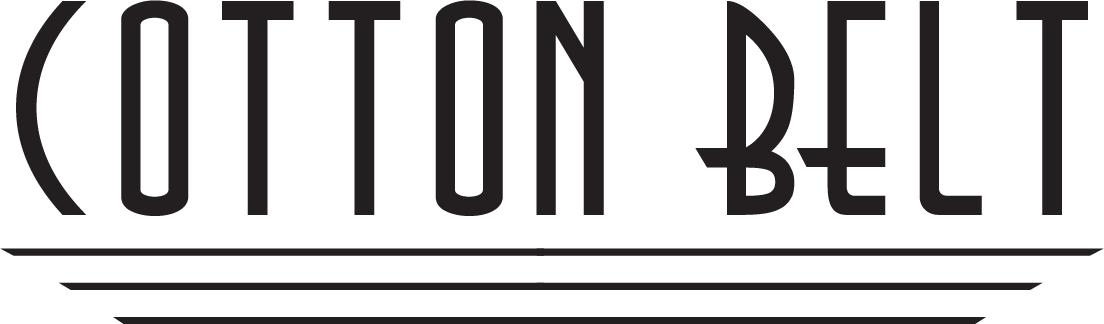
Publicity logos used during planning (above) and construction (below)

Cotton Belt service along the line has been in planning since the original 1983 DART Service Plan. DART previously bought the right-of-way to the 52-mile (84 km) Cotton Belt corridor train tracks in 1990 and freight trains had since ceased use of the tracks. The line was also included in DART's 2030 Transit System Plan. However, in 2010 DART scrapped much of their 2030 plan, citing deficits and drops in revenue. A proposal to use private funding to construct both the Dallas County and Tarrant County segments was considered, but this plan was abandoned after the Texas Legislature failed to enact legislation necessary to the plan during the 2013 state legislative session.

DART officials stated that without private funding options, the agency would not be able to build out the line until at least the mid-2030s. DART considered the possibility of using bus rapid transit as a less costly alternative for current funding.

DART announced in late August 2016 that the project could be fast tracked and completed by as early as 2022, after DART secured funds needed to complete the project.

In late August 2018, the DART board voted to accept a plan which eliminated two previously-proposed stations, reducing the number of planned stations to 10.

On February 12, 2019, the DART board approved construction of a second track along the entire length of the line, which is anticipated to reduce wait times between commuter trains, avert delays during construction and maintenance, and better accommodate freight trains using the line. This design change is projected to cost $109 million, raising the design-build contract to its maximum allowable price of $923 million.

Construction commenced in 2019 after DART secured a $908 million Railroad Rehabilitation and Improvement Financing federal loan from November 2018 to pay for most of the projected $1.1 billion cost. To cover the remainder of the line's cost, DART has asked some cities to pick up a share of the tab to help pay for the costs of stations in places where the line diverts from the freight track's path. Service was initially scheduled to begin by December 28, 2022.

On June 24, 2019, DART announced that the line would be named the Silver Line, bringing the service under the same general branding as the agency's light rail system.

By 2020 the opening had slipped to March 2023, with further delays to 2024 announced the following year.

In January 2023, further delays placed the anticipated service date in late 2025 to mid-2026. The line opened for service on October 25, 2025.

== Operations ==
Service operates seven days a week. On weekdays, trains run from 4 am to 1 am, with 30-minute headways during peak periods (5–9 am and 3–7 pm) and hourly service during all other times. On weekends and major holidays, trains operate hourly in both directions between 5 am and 1 am.

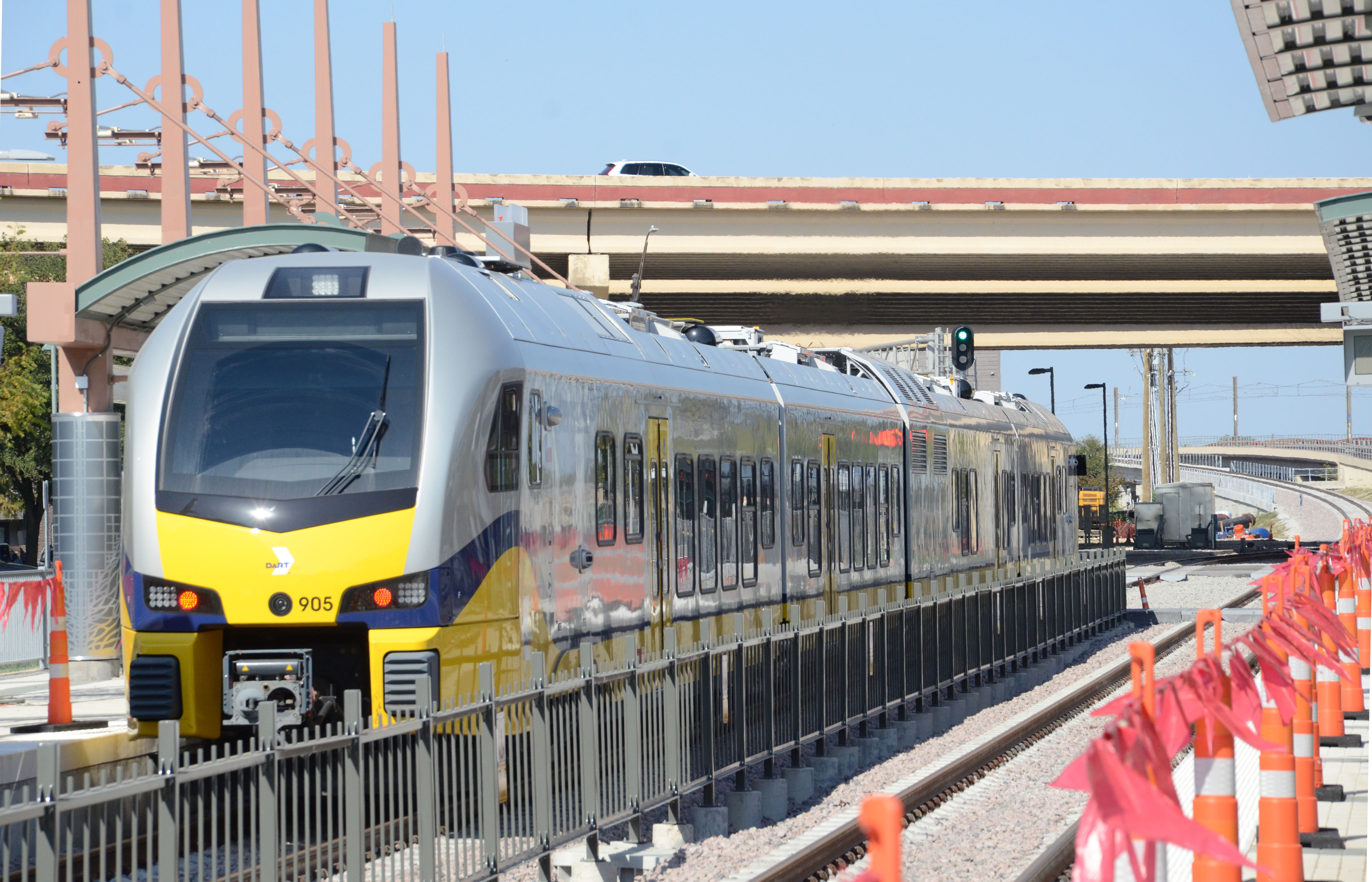
DART 905, one of eight Silver Line FLIRT trainsets, tests at the Cityline/Bush station.

The estimated one-way travel time from end to end is approximately 55 minutes. These run times include station dwell times of 30 seconds at all stations except for Downtown Carrollton, Addison Transit Center, CityLine/Bush, and 12th Street, where dwell times are one minute. In comparison, estimated travel time from the DART Orange Line CityLine/Bush station to DFW Airport Terminal A station is approximately 1.5 hours as it requires travel through downtown Dallas.

Because the trains operate on freight rail tracks, each is staffed by both an engineer and a conductor, unlike light rail services, which have a single operator. To maintain operational flexibility with a small workforce, Silver Line onboard staff are cross-trained, certified, and qualified to perform both roles.

=== Freight ===
As of 2025, four companies move freight along the corridor: the Fort Worth and Western Railroad; the Dallas, Garland and Northeastern Railroad; BNSF; and CPKC. The short line operations are limited to periods of non-peak passenger movements, but the Class I railroads are independently dispatched.

== Route ==
Cotton Belt Rail Line Map

The Silver Line runs approximately 26 miles (42 km) between DFW International Airport to Plano.

Together, the line connects with the Trinity Metro TEXRail commuter rail line at DFW North station providing access to Downtown Fort Worth, Grapevine, and various other Tarrant County locales.

The line connects with DART's Orange, Green, and Red lines providing access to Dallas Love Field and Downtown Dallas via Downtown Carrollton or CityLine/Bush stations. Future connection opportunities exist with the Denton County Transportation Authority A-train commuter rail line. With the completion of the Downtown Carrollton station, the Silver Line will directly connect, providing access to various Denton County locales.

In total, the alignment traverses through three counties including Tarrant, Dallas, and Collin counties, and seven cities including Grapevine, Coppell, Dallas, Carrollton, Addison, Richardson, and Plano.

=== Stations ===
All stations will be designed for accessibility and are fully ADA compliant. There are 10 stations including:

Station	Parking	Municipality	Connections and notes
DFW Airport Terminal B		DFW Airport	TEXRail; DART rail: Orange Line (via walkway to Terminal A); Dallas/Fort Worth International Airport
DFW Airport North		Grapevine	TEXRail
Cypress Waters		Dallas (Note: Located in an exclave that borders non-DART member Coppell)	
Downtown Carrollton		Carrollton	A-train (at Trinity Mills station via northbound Green Line) (Note: An extension of the A-train to Downtown Carrollton station has been proposed); DART rail: Green Line
Addison		Addison	Addison Airport
Knoll Trail		Dallas	Serves Prestonwood Town Center
UT Dallas		Richardson	Serves University of Texas at Dallas
CityLine/Bush		Richardson	DART rail: Red Line, Orange Line (peak only)
12th Street		Plano	DART rail: Red Line, Orange Line (peak only)
Shiloh Road		Plano	

== Rolling stock ==
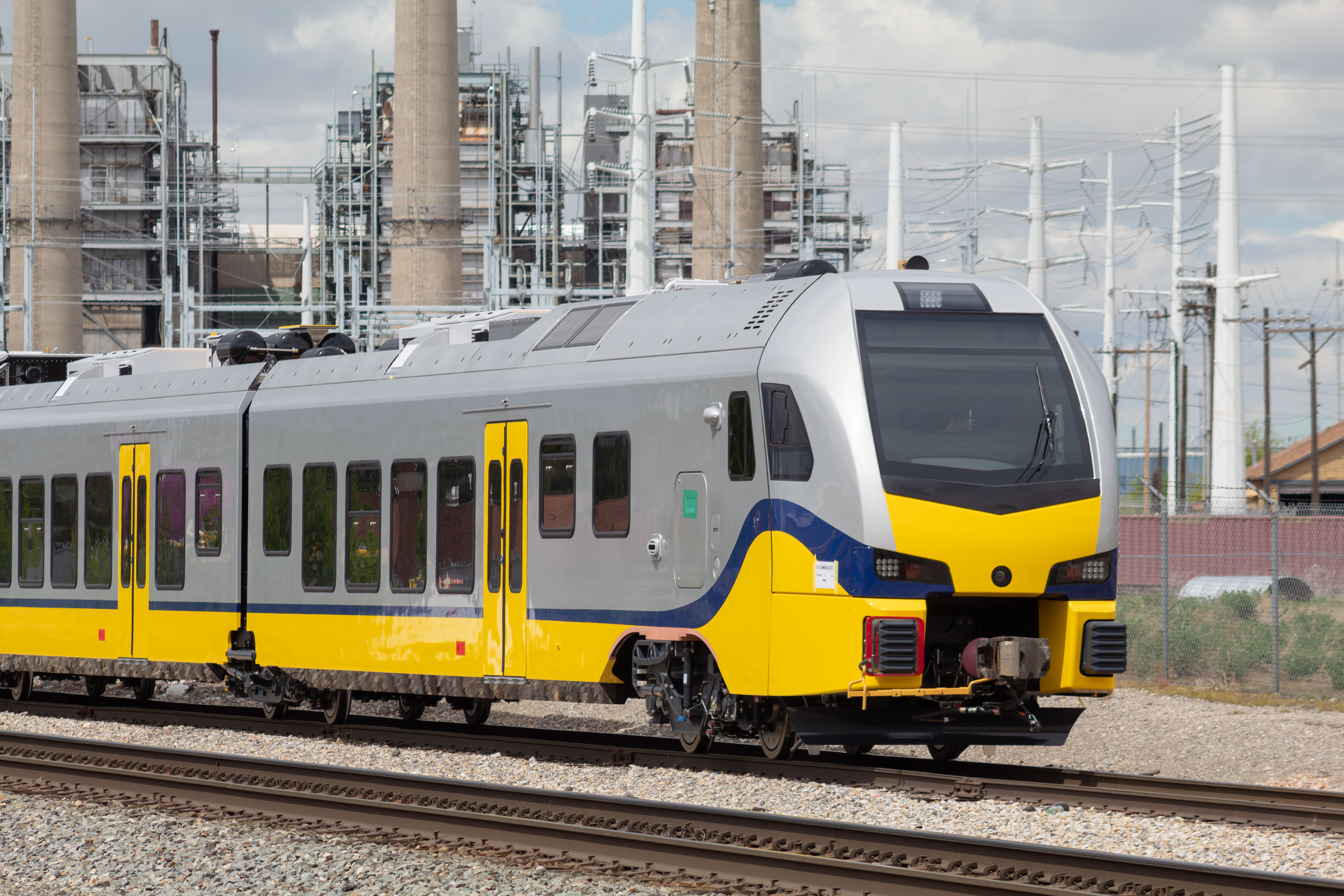
Stadler FLIRT for Silver Line in Salt Lake City, Utah near the Stadler factory

Eight Stadler FLIRT (Fast Light Innovative Regional Train) diesel multiple unit (DMU) trainsets were ordered in June 2019 for use on the Silver Line. This makes DART the fourth transit agency in Texas to operate Stadler Rail DMUs, following the Denton County Transportation Authority's A-train, Capital MetroRail in Austin, and TEXRail. It is also the third system in the United States to use FLIRT DMUs, after TEXRail and the Arrow service in San Bernardino County, California.

The DART FLIRTs are low-floor diesel-electric multiple units designed to meet Federal Railroad Administration Alternative Vehicle Technology (AVT) standards and Buy America requirements. Each trainset includes four passenger coaches and a separate midsection car called a PowerPack which houses the four diesel motors and electric generators, reducing interior noise levels and allowing a larger low-floor area. The trains provide 222 seats with standing room for up to 263 passengers and are fully compliant with the Americans with Disabilities Act. The modular design also allows an additional passenger car to be added or for future conversion to bi-mode operation.

== Plans for expansion ==
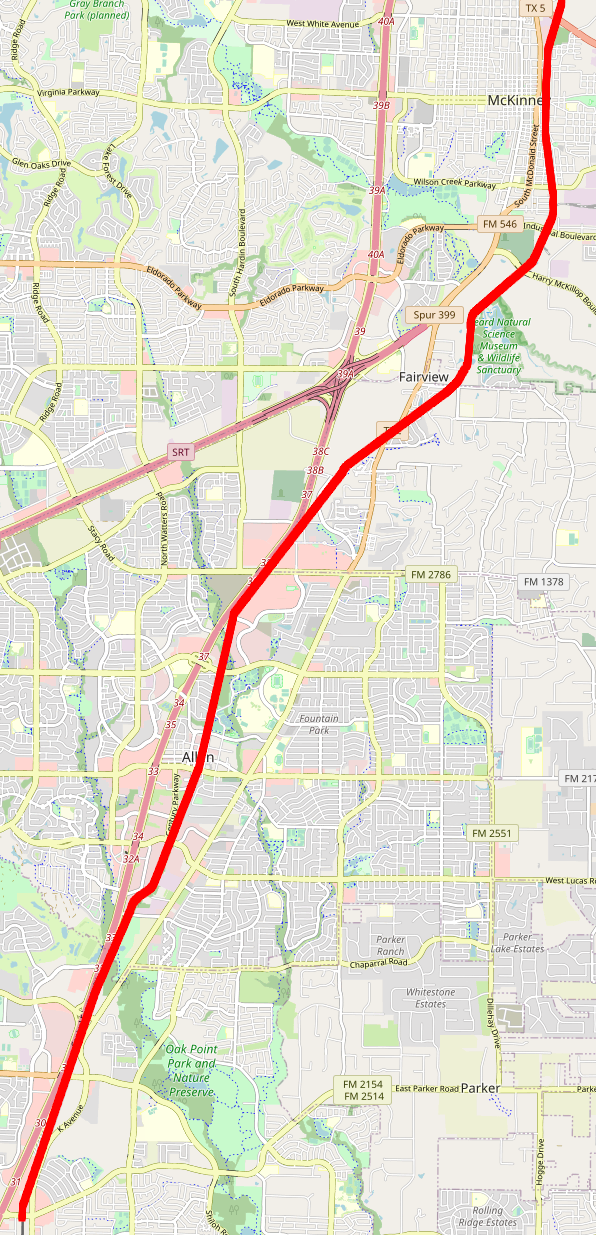
DART-owned corridor from Parker Road station to McKinney, Texas.

An additional segment of the Cotton Belt corridor has been labeled for future expansion. Although no planning has occurred, it would extend the route from Shiloh Road in Plano to Wylie, with stations in the downtowns of Murphy and Wylie. Neither of these towns are DART member cities.

The Environmental Impact Statement (2018) and DARTs 2045 Transit System Plan (2022) suggests that trains may eventually run along the TEXRail corridor to Fort Worth. DARTs 2045 Transit System Plan lists the timeframe as happening in the next 1-10 years, providing “through” service from Plano to Fort Worth.

Another possibility for Silver Line expansion is northward. The North Central Texas Council of Governments (NCTCOG) in a 2022 meeting discussed the possibility of rail expansion beyond the current northern terminus Parker Road Station from Plano through Allen to McKinney. Either the Red Line or the Silver Line could be extended north. The study proposed seven stations between the current Parker Road Station and the hypothetical northern terminus Downtown McKinney Station. The extension would be 18 miles (29 km) long, cost between $700 million and $900 million to construct, and is estimated to have 7,000 to 8,000 riders a day by 2045.
