= Midtown, Dallas =

Midtown
- Neighborhood of Dallas
- Dallas Midtown
- Country: United States
- State: Texas
- Counties: Dallas
- City: Dallas

Area
  - Total: 0.7 sq mi (1.8 km^{2})
- Time zone: UTC-6 (CST)
  - Summer (DST): UTC-5 (CDT)
- ZIP codes: 75240,75231
- Area codes: 214, 972, 469
- Website: http://www.dallasmidtown.com/

Midtown is a mixed-use development district under development in Dallas, Texas (USA). The area is located in North Dallas, bordered by Interstate 635 on the south, Dallas North Tollway on the west, Spring Valley Road on the north, and Preston Road on the east. The development is next to Galleria Dallas, an upscale shopping mall, and is located at the southern end of the Platinum Corridor.

== History ==
A majority of Midtown is being developed on the former site of Valley View Center, originally built in 1973.

In 2011, efforts to coordinate the redevelopment of the mall and the surrounding real estate were being coordinated by the North Dallas Chamber of Commerce. In April 2012, new owners of Valley View Center, Beck Ventures, announced a $4 billion redevelopment plan for the mall and surrounding property dubbed "Dallas Midtown" that would include retail, condominiums, and a "five star" hotel.

The City of Dallas established the Mall Area Redevelopment Tax Increment Financing (TIF) District in 2014.

== Economy ==
Park Tower at Dallas Midtown will include 305,230 square feet of office space and 45,900 square feet of retail space. Hike and bike trails are planned, to connect Midtown to White Rock Creek Trail which leads to White Rock Lake. A trolley system is expected to connect Midtown to the Galleria. Also planned are two luxury hotels, a 10-screen luxury theater, multiple restaurants and entertainment venues.

== Education ==
=== Primary and secondary education ===
==== Public schools ====
Midtown is served by the Dallas Independent School District.

Elementary schools

- Nathan Adams Elementary School(south of Alpha Road, west of Monfort Drive)
- George H. W. Bush Elementary School(north of Alpha Road, west of Monfort Drive)
- John J. Pershing Elementary School(east of Monfort Drive)

Middle schools

- Benjamin Franklin Middle School(east of Monfort Drive)
- E. D. Walker Middle School(west of Monfort Drive)

High schools

- Hillcrest High School(east of Monfort Drive)
- W.T. White High School(west of Monfort Drive)

=== Colleges and universities ===
- Brookhaven College, part of the Dallas County Community College District, is located near Midtown. Brookhaven opened in 1978, making it the newest college in DCCCD, featuring nearly 11,000 students

== Recreation ==
A 20-acre $110 million park, to be called Midtown Commons, will be located in the center of the development.

== Transportation ==
=== Highways ===
- Dallas North Tollway runs north/south.
- U.S. Highway 75 (Central Expressway) runs northeast/southwest.
- Interstate 635 runs east/west

=== Thoroughfares ===
- Preston Road
- Spring Valley Road

== Government and infrastructure ==
=== Local government ===
Midtown is covered by Dallas City Council District 11. Dallas Fire-Rescue Station 20 is located south of Midtown on Monfort Drive. The Dallas Police Department's North Central Patrol Division serves the district.

=== State representation ===
Midtown is located in District 114 of the Texas House of Representatives and is currently represented by John Turner. Midtown is within District 16 of the Texas Senate; currently represented by Nathan Johnson.
