= RRIF =

RRIF may stand for:

- Registered Retirement Income Fund (Canada)
- Railroad Rehabilitation and Improvement Financing (U.S.A.)
- Resource Release Is Finalization, an alternate name for the Resource Acquisition Is Initialization (RAII) programming idiom
