= UT Dallas station =

Commuter rail station in Richardson, Texas

UT Dallas
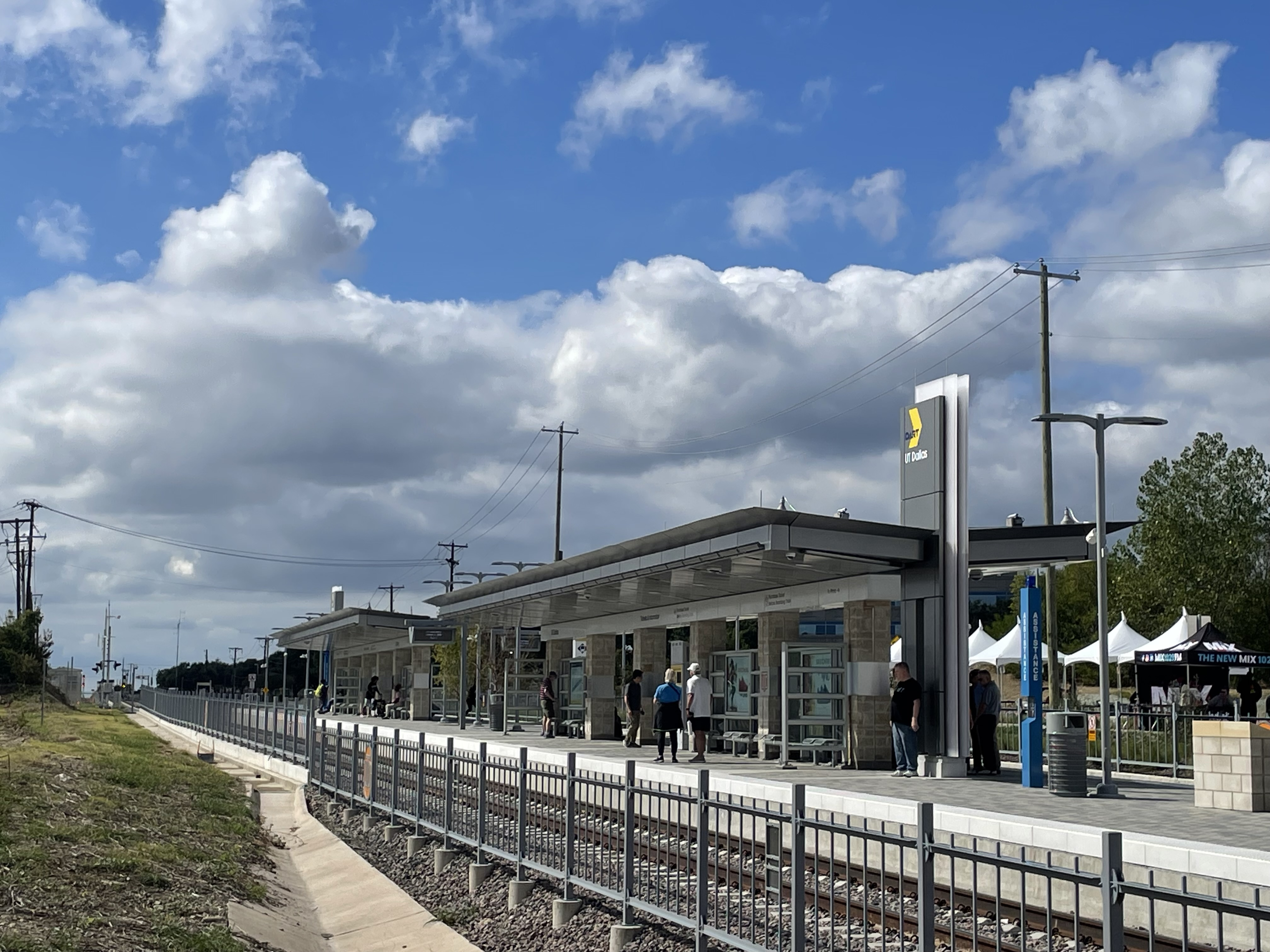

General information
- Location: 3416 Waterview Parkway; Richardson, Texas
- Coordinates: 32.996567°N 96.749638°W
- System: DART rail
- Owner: Dallas Area Rapid Transit
- Platforms: Island platform
- Tracks: 2
- Connections: DART: 244

Construction
- Structure type: At-grade
- Parking: 249 spaces
- Accessible: Yes

History
- Opened: October 25, 2025; 9 months ago

Services
| Preceding station | DART | Following station |
|---|---|---|
| Knoll Trail toward DFW Airport Terminal B | Silver Line | CityLine/Bush toward Shiloh Road |
Location

UT Dallas station is a commuter rail station in Richardson, Texas. The station is operated by Dallas Area Rapid Transit as one of ten stations on the Silver Line.

The station primarily serves the campus of the University of Texas at Dallas (UTD), which it is 1/3 mile (0.54 km) north of, as well as surrounding apartments. The station façade prominently features UTD's logo.

As part of the construction, nearby Rutford Avenue was extended north over the railroad corridor. DART also constructed a surface parking lot for the station, though a parking garage built by UTD has been proposed.

== History ==
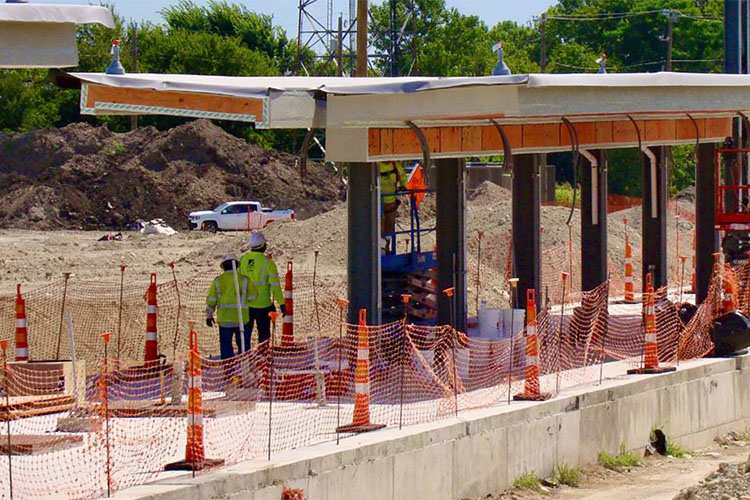
Construction on UT Dallas Station in fall 2022

In 2019, a groundbreaking ceremony was held for the Silver Line at the future UT Dallas station site. DART began construction on the site in 2021.

On June 10, 2024, DART introduced a bus route which stops at the future station site.

The station opened, alongside the rest of the Silver Line, on October 25, 2025.
