= Addison station (DART) =

Commuter rail station in Addison, Texas, US

Addison
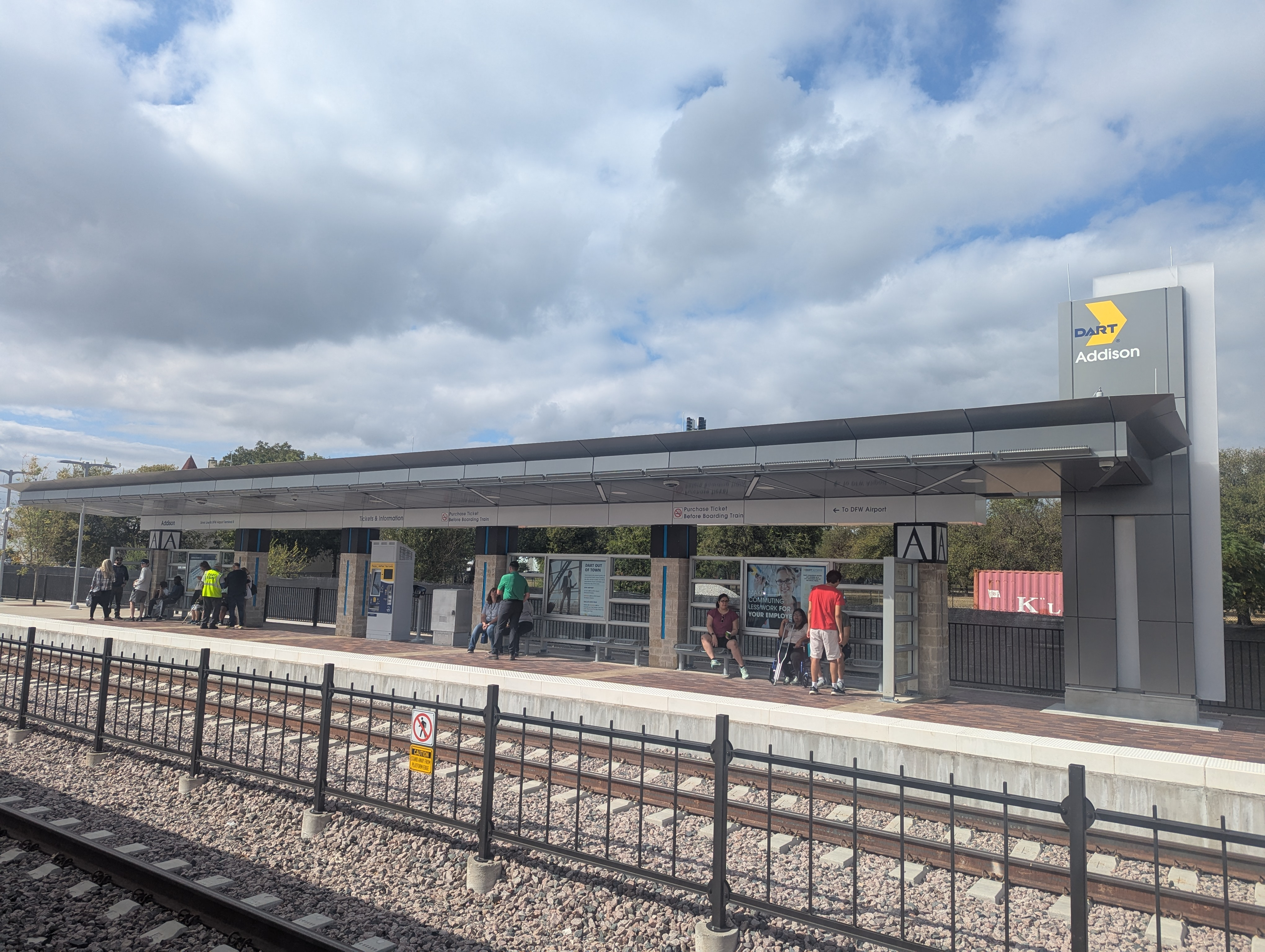
- Westbound Silver Line platform (2025)

General information
- Location: 4925 Arapaho Road; Addison, Texas
- Coordinates: 32°57′31″N 96°49′41″W
- System: DART rail
- Owner: Dallas Area Rapid Transit
- Platforms: 2 side platforms
- Tracks: 2
- Connections: DART: 22, 200, 202, 227, 229, 235, 236, 237, 238, 239, 250, Keller Springs GoLink Zone (M-Sun); Addison Orbit

Construction
- Structure type: At-grade
- Parking: 300 spaces
- Cycle facilities: 1 rack
- Accessible: Yes

History
- Opened: June 7, 1999
- Rebuilt: 2025 (Note: Addition of platforms and track for Silver Line opened on October 25, 2025.)

Services
Preceding station	DART	Following station
Downtown Carrollton toward DFW Airport Terminal B	Silver Line	Knoll Trail toward Shiloh Road
Location

Addison station (previously Addison Transit Center) is a commuter rail station in Addison, Texas. Located on Arapaho Road between Addison Road and Quorum Drive, the station serves the Silver Line of the Dallas Area Rapid Transit rail system, as well as multiple bus routes.

The station services downtown Addison, including Addison Circle Park and Addison Airport. Bus routes at the station connect to the Galleria Dallas mall, Downtown Dallas, and other northern Dallas suburbs.

== History ==
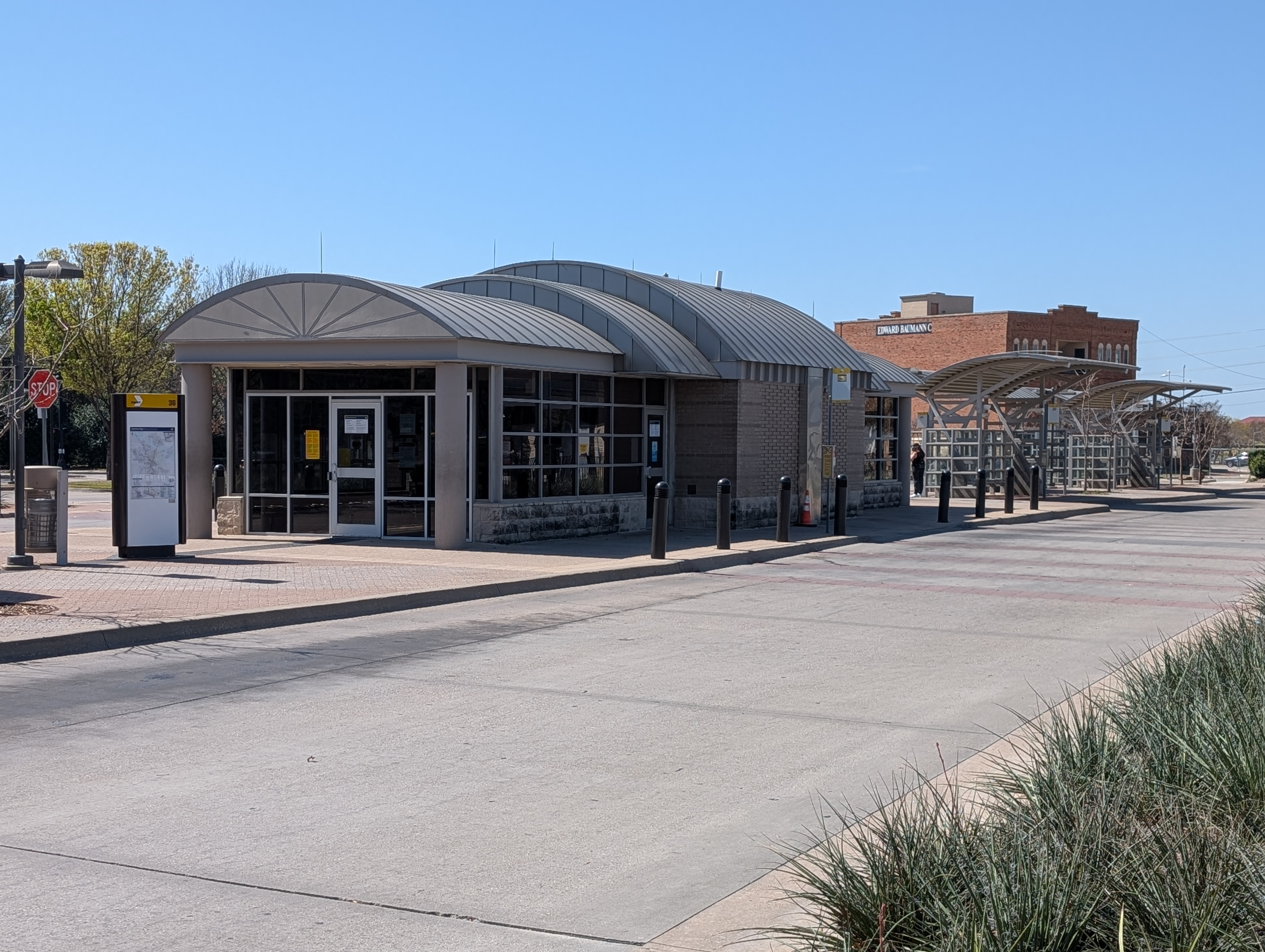
Bus platforms and waiting area (built 1999)

The original Addison Transit Center, a bus station, was opened on June 7, 1999 as a replacement for park-and-ride lots at Prestonwood Mall and Loos Field House. The facility was built at a $7.8 million cost, $5 million of which was for the land.

Four photographic collages of Addison were installed on the ceiling of the facility. The collages, which included images submitted by local residents, were created by local artist Philip Lamb. Lamb had previously worked with DART to create terrazzo panels at Dallas Union Station.

=== Commuter rail ===
Addison Transit Center is adjacent to a rail corridor built by the St. Louis Southwestern Railway (also known as the Cotton Belt Route) which DART purchased in 1990 for a proposed commuter rail line between DFW Airport and Plano. Addison would be included as a station on this route. In fact, following opposition to the line from parts of North Dallas, one proposal suggested making Addison the eastern terminus of the line.

A line on the corridor, later dubbed the Silver Line, was approved in August 2016 In anticipation of the line, the Addison town government announced a $500 million development project on an 18-acre site near the station. Construction of the rail platforms of Addison Transit Center began February 1, 2021. Service began when the Silver Line opened on October 25, 2025.

In 2026, the Addison municipal government voted to hold a referendum on exiting the DART system. If successful, the pullout would force the closure of Addison station, dividing its bus service between Knoll Trail station and Prestonwood Town Center. In April of that year, to replace DART service, the town government launched a six-month pilot microtransit service, dubbed Addison Orbit, in that would connect to the Silver Line at Knoll Trail. Ultimately, the pullout effort failed by a 40-point margin; however, Addison Orbit service continues to be offered throughout the town, including at Addison station itself.
