= Preston Highlands, Dallas =

Preston Highlands
- Country: United States
- State: Texas
- Counties: Collin
- City: Dallas
- Area: north Dallas
- Elevation: 658 ft (201 m)
- ZIP code: 75252
- Area codes: 214, 469, 972

Preston Highlands is a neighborhood in Far North Dallas, Texas (USA). The neighborhood is generally bounded by Preston Road (SH 289) on the west, Frankford Road on the south, Hillcrest Road on the east, and on Fortson and Amador Avenues on the north. The shopping center located at the northeast corner of Preston and Frankford Roads is not included as part of the neighborhood.

== Education ==
The neighborhood is served by both the Richardson Independent School District and the Plano Independent School District.
