= Prestonwood Town Center =

Shopping center in Dallas, Texas

- Location: Dallas, Texas, United States
- Coordinates: 32.95574°N 96.81691°W
- Address: Belt Line Road
- Opened: 1979
- Closed: 2000
- Demolished: Late 2003 (Neiman Marcus razed May 2004)
- Developer: Hunt Properties
- Num. of stores: All demolished
- Num. of anchor tenants: 5 (at peak)
- Floors: 2

Prestonwood Town Center was a two-level enclosed shopping mall located at the northeast corner of Belt Line Road and Montfort Drive in Dallas, Texas that opened in 1979 and was demolished in 2004. The mall contained a central ice rink. Prestonwood Town Center was replaced by a 62-acre (250,000 m^{2}) retail shopping center of the same name that opened in 2006. The new center includes Barnes & Noble, DSW, Michaels, Office Depot, Petco, Ulta Beauty, and Walmart as well as various restaurants and services.

== History ==
The current property occupies the site of a former, enclosed shopping mall that was also officially named Prestonwood Town Center, but was informally known locally as Prestonwood Mall. A two-level mall opened in 1979 featuring anchor stores Neiman Marcus, Lord & Taylor, JCPenney, Joske's, and Montgomery Ward. Wards closed its location in November 1984 and was replaced by Mervyn's in April 1985. In 1987, Joske's was changed into Dillard's as a result of a buy-out. A central ice rink was used by skaters and after hours by local hockey leagues.

While the mall remained near full occupancy into the 1990s, two problems arose in the 1980s that eventually contributed to its demise. First, local competition increased steadily over the years as many nearby malls opened or extensively renovated their spaces for new stores. In 1982, the Dallas Galleria opened with anchor stores Saks Fifth Avenue, Marshall Field's, and later in 1985 with Macy's. In 1983, Bloomingdale's opened at nearby Valley View Center. Second, the opening of the nearby DART Transit Center in 1985 (see below) allowed local teenagers to travel by bus to and from the mall with little to no parental supervision, giving them ample opportunity to loiter at the mall or close by for hours, which soon led to incidents of criminal mischief that would harm the mall's reputation for years. Major renovations that were planned to start in 1996 never materialized and the anchor stores soon began closing. Citing poor sales, JCPenney closed its location in September 1997 and was quickly followed by Mervyn's. With Neiman Marcus and Lord & Taylor as the only two anchor tenants remaining by 1999, they each announced plans to relocate to The Shops at Willow Bend, a new mall in nearby Plano, which opened in 2001.

Archon Group bought the mall in 2000 with major plans to renovate it into a telecommunications-based development called "Genisus Dallas North." After extensive remodeling and only limited use, Archon announced in October 2003 that they would demolish the enclosed mall structure instead and replace it with an open-air retail shopping center. By summer 2004, it was completely demolished.

== Former features ==
In 1985, Dallas Area Rapid Transit opened a major bus transfer station on a street bordering the Prestonwood Town Center parking lot. Mall officials warned commuters that this was not a park and ride facility and that their cars would be towed. This dispute lasted for several years, but by 1988 a compromise had been worked out to use a limited parking area for park and ride commuters. Disputes between the transit agency and mall management closed the park and ride lot for a time in the mid 1990s, but it eventually reopened. In 1999, this facility was closed and operations were transferred to the purpose-built Addison Transit Center nearby.
