= Valley View Center =

Shopping mall in Dallas, Texas, U.S.

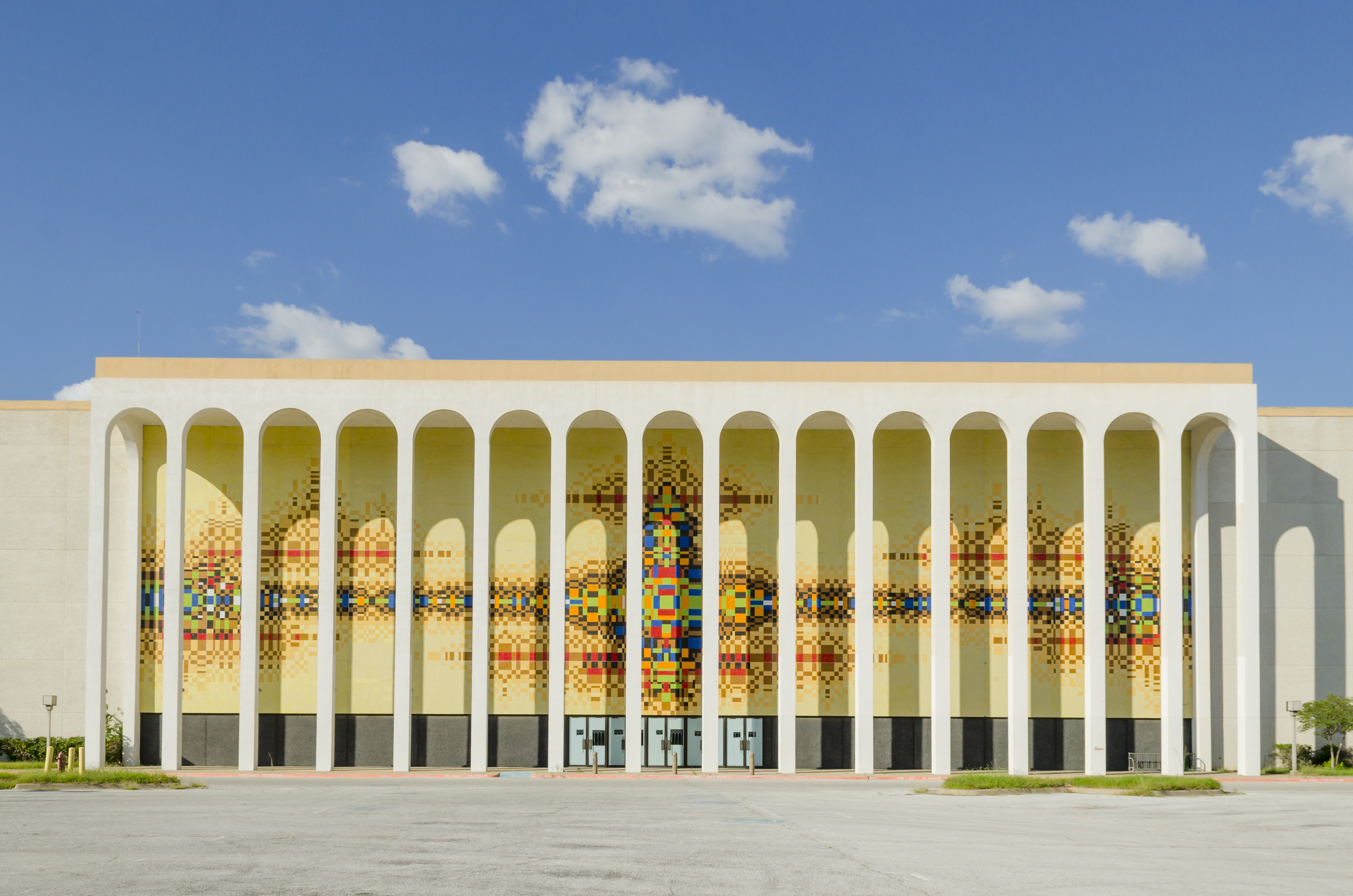
- Location: 13331 Preston Road; Dallas, Texas 75240 U.S.
- Coordinates: 32°55′46″N 96°48′30″W
- Opened: August 1973; 53 years ago
- Closed: 2017 (mall), January 2022 (AMC)
- Demolished: 2017 (Macy's), 2019 (mall), 2023 (AMC)
- Developer: Homart Development Company
- Manager: SGP, Beck Ventures and Life Time Inc.
- Owner: Seritage Growth Properties, Beck Ventures and Life Time Inc.
- Architect: Architectonics, Inc.
- Num. of stores: 134
- Num. of anchor tenants: 6
- Floor area: 1,635,449 sq ft (151,938 m^{2})
- Floors: 2 (3 including the AMC) (4 if including anchor tenants)

Valley View Center was a shopping mall located at Interstate 635 and Preston Road in north Dallas, Texas, U.S. It is owned and managed by Dallas-based Beck Ventures. The mall was formerly home to anchor stores that were once JCPenney, Macy's, Sears, and Dillard's.

Originally developed between 1965 and 1973, the mall flourished and expanded during the 1980s, however began to encounter financial difficulties by the 1990s. Bloomingdale's closed its location in 1990, which triggered a court battle with the mall's then-owner, LaSalle Street Fund, when Montgomery Ward attempted to acquire the anchor space that Bloomingdale's previously occupied, which resulted in the space remaining empty until JCPenney opened in 1996. The site of the mall's original movie theater closed in 1991, remained empty for over a decade, and was eventually renovated and replaced with studio spaces for radio stations KBFB and KZMJ. A new, larger AMC movie theater later opened, in 2004.

The addition of the new theater slowed but did not halt the mall's decline. Macy's and Dillard's closed in 2008, and JCPenney in 2013. The three anchor spaces remained vacant, despite differing proposed plans for renovation. The mall's first and longest-running anchor store, Sears, closed in 2017. The AMC theater and remainder of the mall closed in early 2022. Demolition of the mall was completed in May 2023.

== History ==
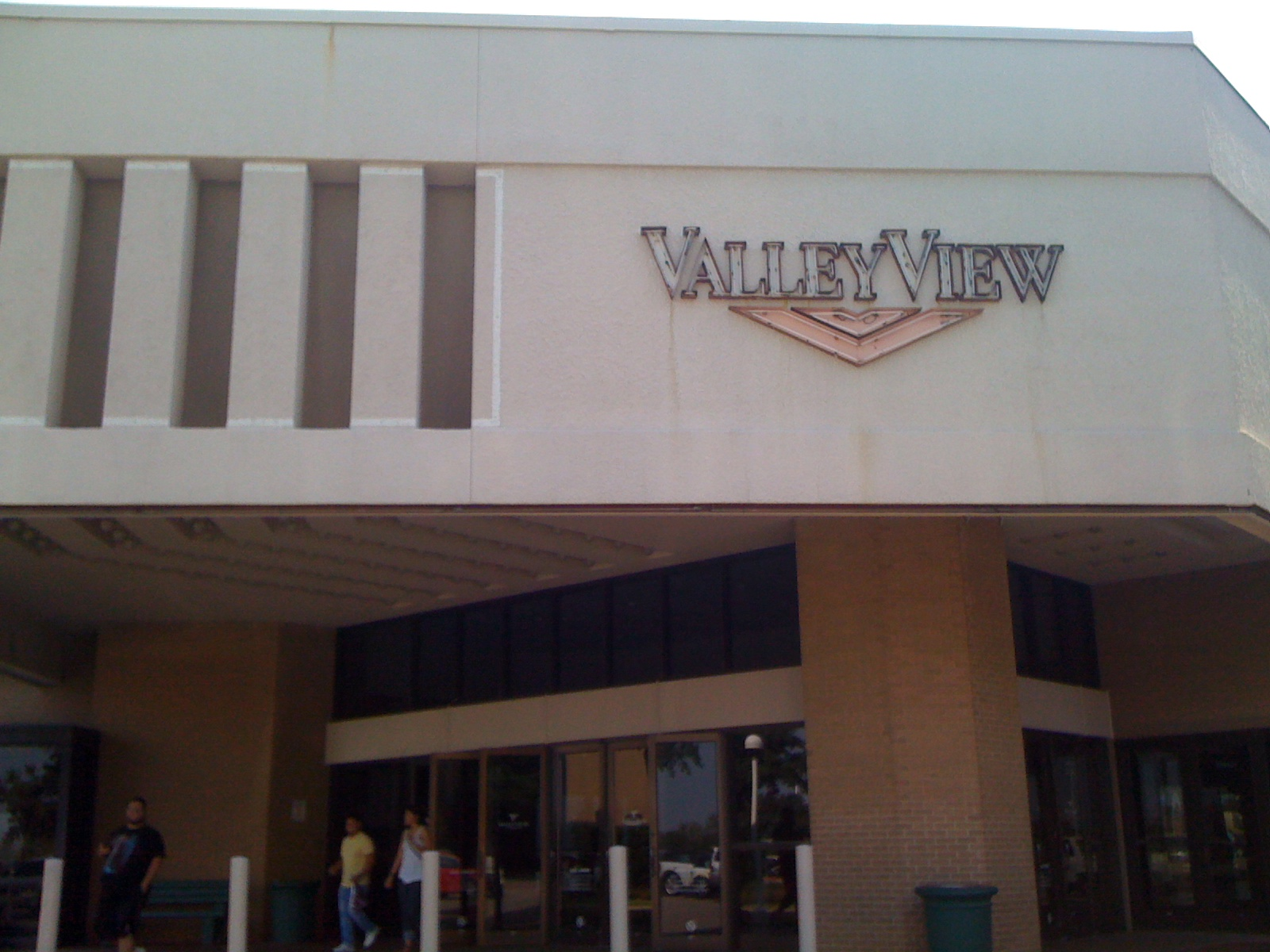
East entrance, June 2012

The mall was originally developed around 1973 when Homart Development Company, the real estate development subsidiary of Sears, Roebuck & Co. at the time, added a Sanger-Harris and several smaller stores to the existing Sears store that had been built in 1965. Homart retained Architectonics, Inc. to design the new building. In August 1973, as part of the mall's grand opening celebration, the Thom McAn Shoe Store offered a free 8 oz. steak with any purchase of $5 or more. This promotion drew local and national media attention.

LaSalle Street Fund bought the mall in 1982 and oversaw continued expansion, including the addition of a fourth anchor store in 1983. September 1, 1985, marked the first legal Sunday shopping day in the State of Texas. It, like other area malls, celebrated the end of the state's 24-year-old blue law with entertainment and special promotions. Some smaller retailers objected to the new hours but mall officials informed them in writing of their contractual obligations to operate while the mall is open. January 1, 1987, was the first New Year's Day that the anchor stores were open for business on the holiday. Many smaller stores in the mall followed their lead, although it would be a few years before every store would be obligated to be open on the first day of the new year.

The mall's ownership and management changed multiple times in the last two decades. The Macerich Company, a Santa Monica, California-based shopping center operator, purchased the mall in 1996 for a reported $85.5 million in cash and debt. Nearby demographic shifts and the continuing occupancy decline led owners to announce plans to redevelop the mall and surrounding area. Beginning around 2000, the neighborhoods near the mall became notably younger, poorer, and more ethnically diverse. According to the 2010 census, the surrounding neighborhood was 60% Hispanic with the percentage of white residents dropping from about 35% in 2000 to just under 25%.

In November 2007, the International Council of Shopping Centers presented a Maxi award in the Community Relations category to Valley View Center for work with the Texas Council of Girl Scouts.

In 2010, LNR Partners, Inc., of Miami, Florida, took possession of the mall when Macerich defaulted on $125 million in debt. Jones Lang LaSalle became responsible for mall management. The former space of Steve & Barry's reopened as Bontera Bazzar c. 2011, and was renamed El Mercado the following year. With a change in ownership during 2012, Jones Lang LaSalle ended their management involvement as a new owner, Beck Ventures, took management in-house. Beck Ventures purchased the 1.65 million square ft. property.

In mid 2012, the mall began a new effort to create an artistic community. Dubbed "The Gallery at Midtown and Artists Studios," the wings remaining open were occupied by local artists' studios, galleries, and other creative groups.

Beginning December 2016, demolition of the mall site was slated to begin (exceptions were made at the time for AMC Valley View 16, Sears, and the studios for radio stations KBFB and KZMJs) and the surrounding real estate was set to be redeveloped into a mixed-use development that would be called Dallas Midtown. Much of these redevelopment plans have yet to come to fruition due to various conflicts. Demolition was temporarily halted in 2017, with the only locations demolished being a former parking garage and the space formerly occupied by Sanger-Harris/Foley's/Macy's, as the planned redevelopments stalled due to separate legal conflicts, zoning, and the loss of public sector incentives from the City of Dallas.

In May 2017, The Gallery and Studios were closed indefinitely. During 2017, each radio station closed their respective spaces and relocated to new, different locations. On July 16, 2017, the longest running anchor, Sears, closed its location, making AMC Theatres the only remaining anchor in operation and the only portion of the original mall site remaining accessible to the public.

In February 2019, the remaining tenants in the corridor to the former Sears and AMC Theatres were forced to vacate before the end of March 2019. In May 2019, with the former JCPenney and former Dillard's halfway through demolition, the former Sears corridor was blocked off from public access and was being prepared for demolition, with one entrance that was left open to allow public access to the AMC Theatres as a result of closure of the entrance by the former Sears site. The former sites of JCPenney, Macy's, Dillard's, Sears, and the corridors were then closed off from public access, along with the first floor that included the former food court. Demolition of the mall was completed in May 2023.

On February 11, 2023, the Valley View mall caught fire, which was extinguished after about 50 firefighters responded to the two-alarm fire. The cause of the fire is still being determined and investigated.

Construction of Dallas Midtown is currently slated for 2024.

== Redevelopment plans ==
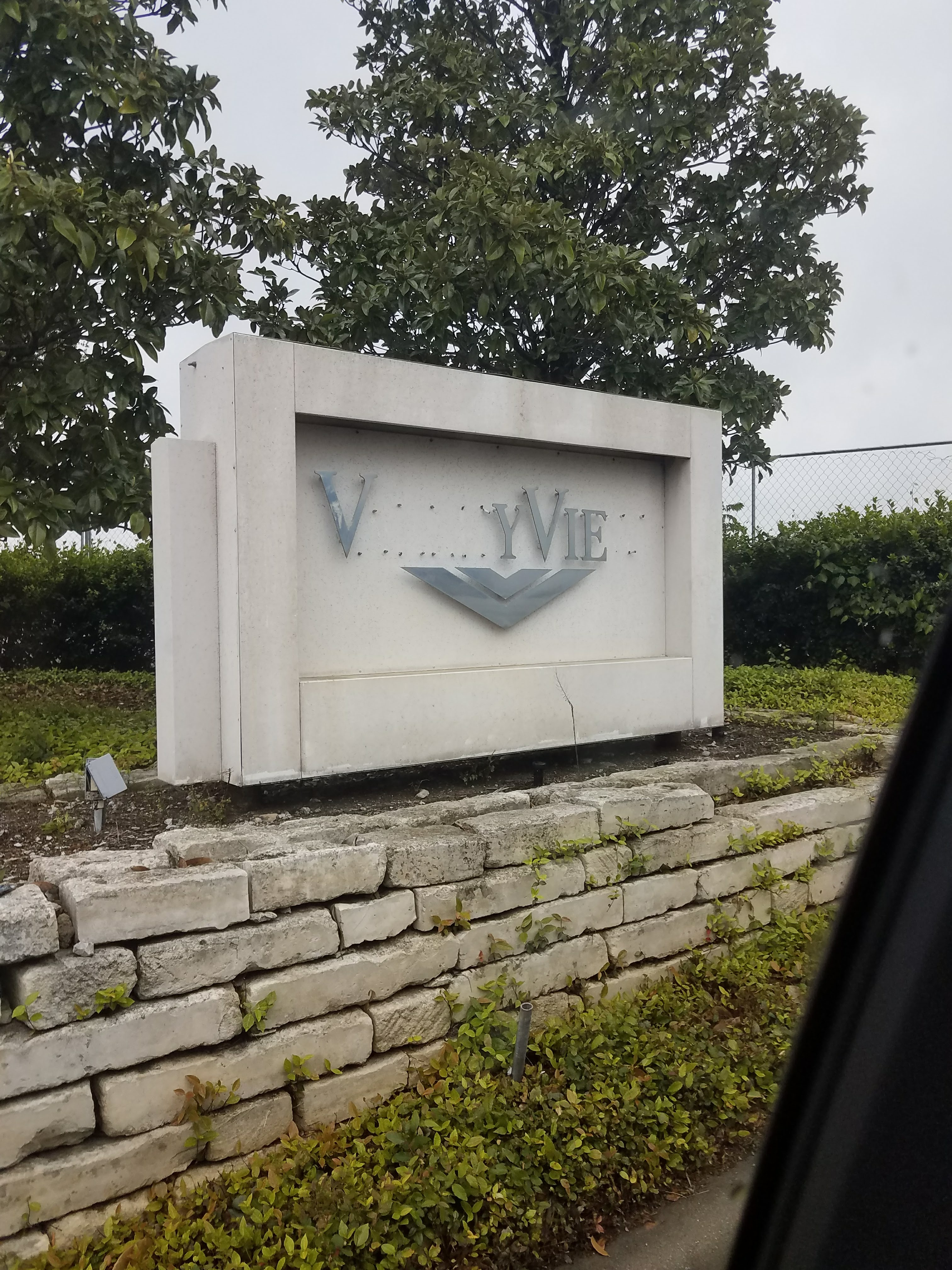
Sign facing Interstate 635 Service Rd

Beginning in 2011, the North Dallas Chamber of Commerce became involved in an effort to coordinate the redevelopment of the mall and the surrounding area. In April 2012, then-new owners Beck Ventures announced a $2 billion redevelopment plan for the mall & surrounding property. It was dubbed "Dallas Midtown," including retail, luxury condominiums, and a "five-star" hotel that was to be designed and operated by hotel impresario Paul Ruffino and his company Hospitality Management Services. To fill vacant spaces, storefronts were soon converted into artist studios and a gallery, which remain in place as of June 2018. A mercado was set to be constructed in cooperation with a local Spanish-language radio station, and multiple food court restaurants were to become home to test kitchens for local food trucks. The second floor of El Mercado was closed in May 2014. By early 2017, El Mercado was closed in its entirety.

Upon starting the demolition from the Macy's store end, it abruptly stopped as it was said further demolition would impact utilities in some of the other remaining stores. With this delay, approximately $36 million in tax incentives from the City of Dallas were rescinded when Beck Ventures failed to raze the original mall site in its entirety by the end of June 2016, as first planned. A later proposal in 2017 by Beck Ventures of $50 million in new incentives was rejected by the Dallas City Council.

In September 2017, 100 acres of the original mall site was proposed in a joint venture to be the location for Amazon HQ2.

On June 1, 2026, it was reported that the Dallas Mavericks took a significant step in their search for a future arena and entertainment district, announcing Monday that they have entered into option agreements for the potential purchase of approximately 104 acres at the former Valley View Mall site. The organization said the decision came after analyzing several locations while working with the City of Dallas to identify potential sites for a new arena and entertainment district.

== Anchors ==
=== Sears ===
The 235,055 square feet (21,837.3 m^{2}) Sears, Roebuck and Company anchor predates the mall itself having been built in 1965. This Sears was built as a two-story freestanding store on what was then the far north fringe of Dallas County and the location was largely surrounded by pasture land. Seven years later, the Homart Development Company (a Sears division) built a Sanger-Harris department store on the site and connected it to Sears with a corridor of specialty retailers, creating Valley View Center.

In April 2017, it was announced that Sears would be closing as part of a plan to close 30 stores nationwide. The store was sold to the developer and closed on July 16, 2017; but, unlike the other closed anchor sites, the interior corridor to the former store would remain publicly accessible until May 2019.

In December 2017, New York City-based Seritage Growth Properties, which was formed in 2015 led by Eddie Lampert when Sears Holdings sold 235 of its store properties to Seritage, including the Sears at Valley View Center Mall, in partnership with Dallas-based KDC, announced plans to build two towers with up to a combined one million square feet (93,000 m^{2}) of office space on 23 acres (9.3 ha) of the former Sears site. Jared operated an outparcel on the site until 2020.

=== Sanger-Harris / Foley's / Macy's ===
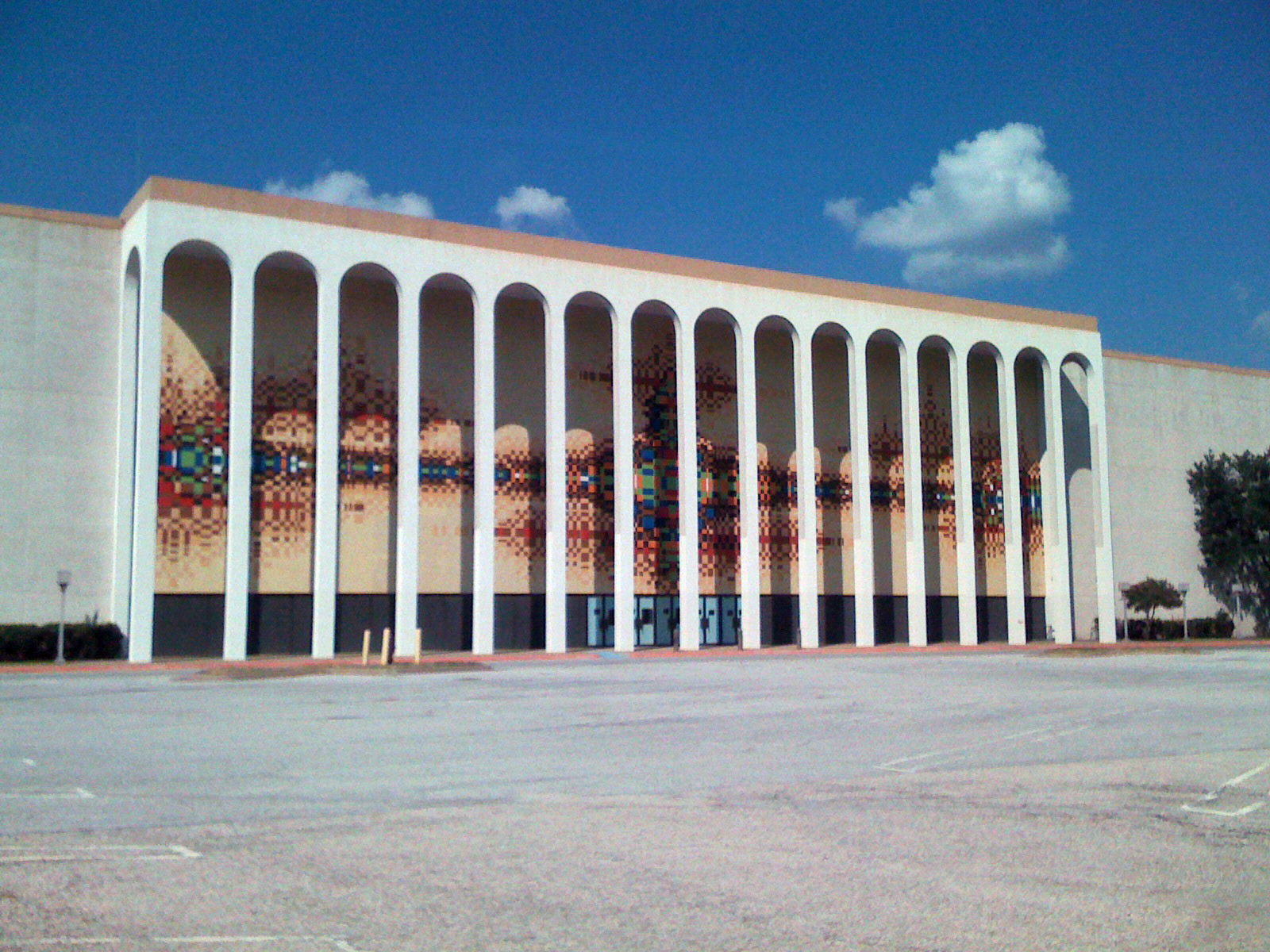
The former Macy's (originally Sanger-Harris) in June 2012

The mall's second anchor (300,196 square feet (27,889 m^{2})) opened in August 1973 as a two-level Sanger-Harris department store as part of the original Valley View Center development. A third floor was added to the store c. 1976. Sanger Harris was merged with Foley's and ceased using the Sanger Harris naming convention in 1987; then, the now-combined company was sold to May Department Stores in 1988. The store was eventually rebranded to Macy's on September 9, 2006, as a result of Federated Department Stores' purchase of the May Company in 2005. This location ceased operation and closed on March 15, 2008. In September 2011, the building's owner at the time, Montfort Mall LLC, announced plans to occupy the building with a "general merchandise" store. This particular plan never materialized. The front parking lot was later fenced off from public access for automobiles from April through December 2016.

In February 2017, the exterior mosaic murals originally commissioned by Sanger-Harris were removed and demolition on the site was officially commenced by the site's owner, EF Properties, with plans to redevelop the site for mixed-use redevelopment in partnership with Ross Perot Jr.'s Hillwood Urban. Total demolition, however, stalled after Beck Ventures sued to prevent the site from being demolished completely. A trial on the fate of this particular plan was set for August 2018. The site was later completely demolished by the end of March 2019.

=== Dillard's ===
The mall's third anchor, a Dillard's department store (302,268 square feet (28,082 m^{2})), opened in 1979 originally as a two-level store accompanied by further expansion of the mall. In October 1985, a third sales floor and a fourth floor storage room and penthouse were added to the store location. Linens, furniture, electronics and housewares were relocated to the new third level and several clothing departments on the original two levels were expanded. A candy and cookie department as well as a juniors' department were added. On July 2, 2008, Dillard's announced that it would close this location effective August 30, 2008. After the store closed, the Dillard's signage on the building, and on the mall's road sign, still remained for a few months until they were removed by management, respectively. The entrances were shuttered and the mall's parking deck has been fenced off twice since closing: once in 2009–2013, and once again after November 2016. Asbestos removal in the former Dillard's space occurred in March 2019 and demolition of the site began the next month.

=== Bloomingdale's / JCPenney ===
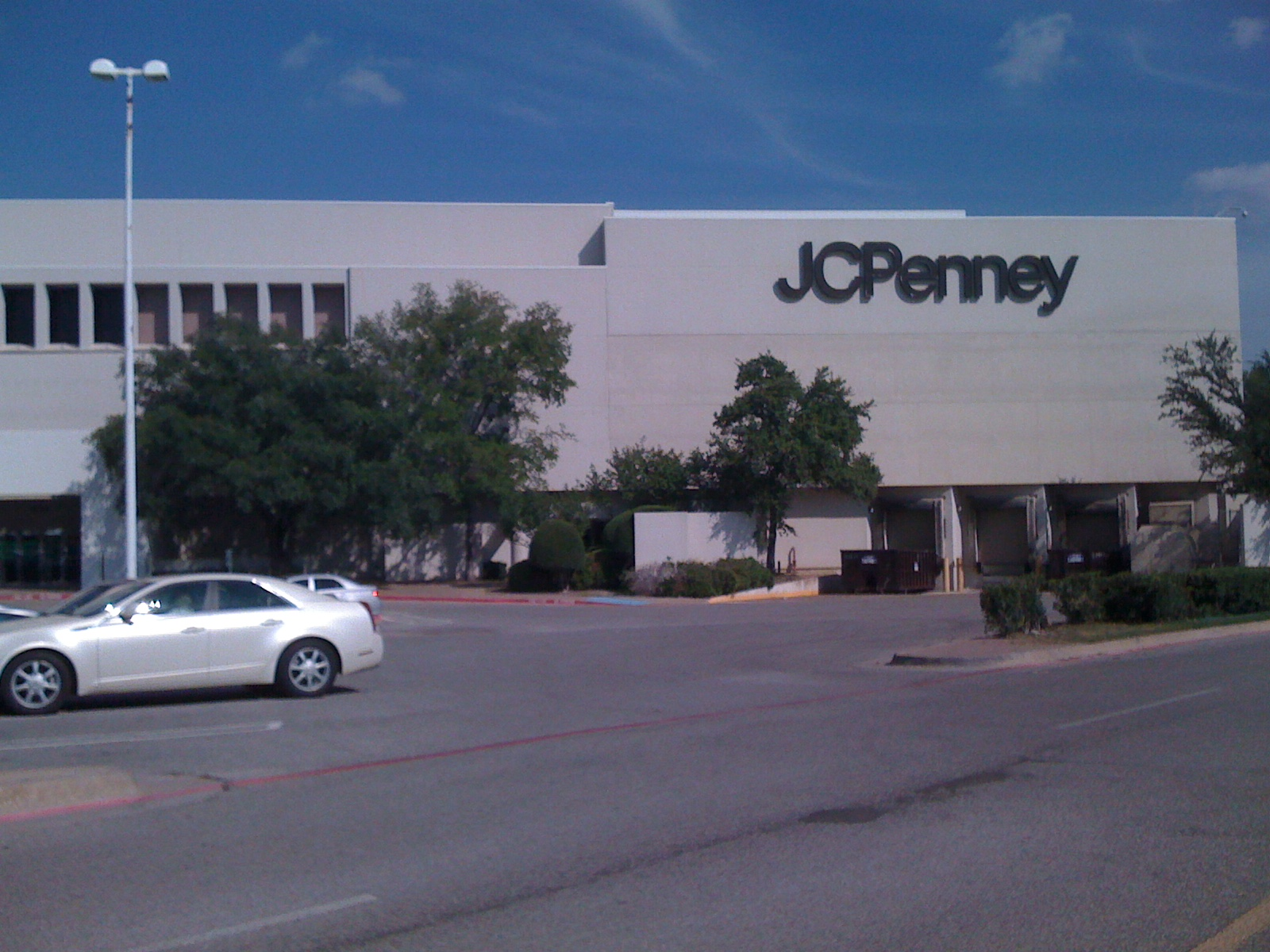
JCPenney (originally Bloomingdale's) in June 2012

In 1982, LaSalle Street Fund purchased Valley View Center Mall and expanded the mall again with more interior stores, including a fourth anchor store. This 220,378-square-foot (20,474 m^{2}) new anchor location was originally developed for Bloomingdale's, which opened its doors in early 1983.

On August 18, 1990, Bloomingdale's closed this location due to declining sales and rising local competition. After the store's closure, the mall, which identified store locations by anchor store quadrants, furnished the former Bloomingdale's corridor with a grand piano, added landscaping and artwork, and branded the area as "The Conservatory." In August 1990, Montgomery Ward & Co. Inc. attempted to acquire the ground lease for this anchor space from Federated Department Stores Inc. through a bankruptcy court proceeding. The company had plans to buy the 200,000-square-foot (19,000 m^{2}) building for a new Montgomery Ward location. Valley View Center Mall's owner at the time, Chicago, Illinois-based LaSalle Street Fund Inc. of Delaware, filed an objection to this plan. In March 1991, a U.S. Bankruptcy Court judge in Cincinnati, Ohio, ruled that Federated may withdraw from its deal to sell the building in favor of a deal from the LaSalle Street Fund to "avoid further costs of litigation" and as it would be "a sound business decision." JCPenney opened a store at the location on October 19, 1996.

The location was the metroplex's largest JCPenney store by area until the closure of its third floor in March 2012. While briefly the planned location of a "secret prototype" JCPenney store, it further downsized at the turn of 2013. The following February, JCPenney announced that this location would be closed on May 1, 2013, but did not undergo a full liquidation sale. Everything on the second floor except the styling salon closed from the public in January, and the store did close on May 1, 2013, as planned. The "store-of-the-future" prototype was scheduled to open in the same space in 2014, but the company ultimately decided to not execute their original plan.

Because of the failure to follow through with the "store of the future" reopening, in October 2016, a small liquidation sale operated on the first floor of the space to sell its remaining items, including but not limited to furniture, office items, display cases, lighting fixtures, planters, shelving units, mannequins, holiday decor, and leftover merchandise. The sale's final day was October 19, 2016, which coincided with the 20th anniversary of the JCPenney location's opening. After the sale, the space remained vacant until its demolition in April 2019.

== Features ==
=== AMC Valley View 16 ===
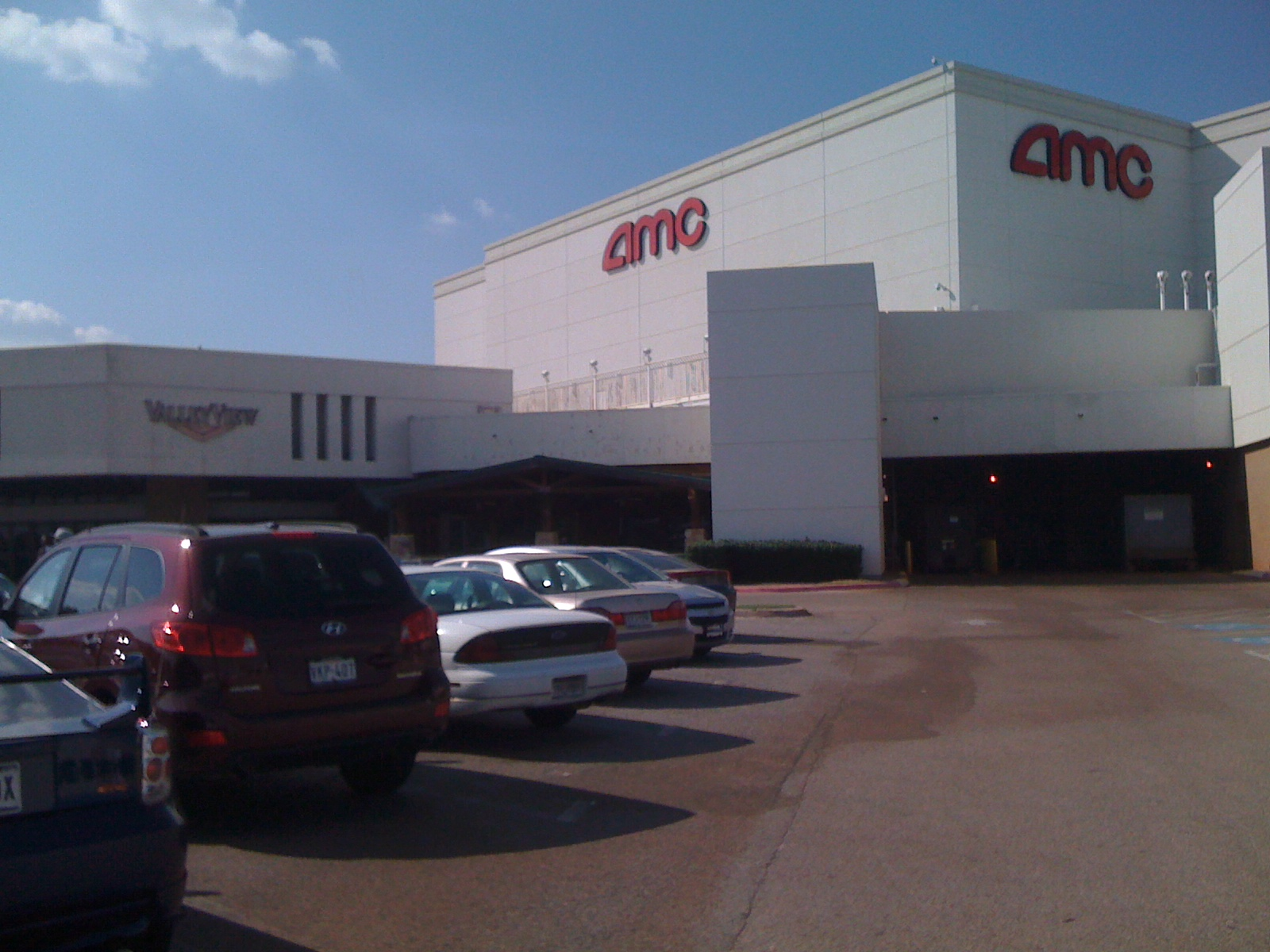
AMC Valley View 16 from the south side of the mall, June 2012

In 2000, as part of a general redevelopment of the mall, Valley View Center Mall officials announced the addition of a 20-screen AMC movie theater as a fifth anchor. After several delays, construction for a 16-screen AMC movie theater began in June 2003 and officially opened on May 14, 2004. The grand opening was marked by a ceremonial "ticket-tearing" featuring Dat Nguyen and Jason Witten of the Dallas Cowboys. The stadium-style seating theater complex was not built on top of the Sears anchor store as originally planned. In fact, the AMC continued after the Sears store was razed. AMC announced a permanent closure of the theatre following showtimes on January 2, 2022.

=== Valley View Cinema 1 & 2 / Radio One ===
In 1975, a twin-screen movie theater owned and operated by General Cinema Corporation was added to the northeast corner of the mall. The theater, formally known as Valley View Cinema 1 & 2, closed in 1991. The facade of the movie theater was then boarded up and the interior furnishings were stripped out. The 13,240 square feet (1,230 m^{2}) space remained empty until it was renovated in late 2001 by Radio One to house radio stations KBFB and KZMJ. Renovation included leveling the sloping floors in the theater and installing new air-conditioning and heating units. Officially opened in January 2002, the broadcast studios, located on the mall's second level, are in what were originally the former theater's projection rooms. The area that originally housed the box office counters became the reception desk and part of one movie theater was retained as a 150-seat auditorium. The facility also included a small basketball court, two production studios, a mix room, a newsroom, and office space. Both radio stations closed their respective spaces and relocated to new, separate locations in 2017.

=== Smart Shoppers Club ===
In April 1994, Valley View Center added a frequent-shopper rewards program called the Smart Shoppers Club. Mall management said they planned to spend roughly $500,000 over the first two years of the program in a bid to increase mall traffic while collecting invaluable demographic data about mall shoppers. Within five months, 9,000 shoppers had joined the club and the mall announced a goal of 20,000 members by the end of 1994. Shoppers logged their visits by swiping their membership card and entering a personal identification number at one of the mall's three touch-screen kiosks. Member benefits included special discount coupons, free gifts, and the chance to win prizes. Club members also received a periodic Shopping Smart newsletter, a Valley View Center shopping bag, plus a birthday card and gift. The Smart Shoppers Club was terminated in late 2000 when it was replaced by a cardless web-based system called Centerlinq.

=== Dallas Children's Museum ===
Originally opened in August 1998 at the Inwood Village shopping center, the Dallas Children's Museum relocated to Valley View Center in June 2000. The new museum, double the size of the previous location, was on the second level of the mall between the former JCPenney and the space once occupied by the Disney Store. For six years, the museum hosted both touring cultural exhibits and permanent features, including a play hospital and kid-sized grocery store. In September 2006, the Museum of Nature & Science and the Dallas Children's Museum announced their merger and closed the Valley View Center location. The museum reopened in Fair Park as the Children's Museum at the Museum of Nature & Science in October 2006.

=== The Gallery at Midtown and Artists Studios ===
As part of a cultural experiment, Beck Ventures began talks in mid 2012 with notable local artists about creating a thriving, artistic community, along with North Texas' largest local artist cooperative gallery, later known as "The Gallery at Midtown and Artist Studios," located at the center of the western portion of Valley View Center Mall. By 2014, this comprised over 90% of three upstairs wings of the mall. Surrounding the main gallery were several artist-run studios and showrooms, experimental galleries, private galleries, work spaces, a movie school, an actor's studio, and other artistic groups. Every third Saturday of the month from 6:00 p.m. to 10:00 p.m., the Gallery at Midtown was open to the public for an "Art Walk." The Gallery and Studios were closed indefinitely in May 2017 with plans to return as part of Dallas Midtown.

== See also ==
- The Oldest View, a horror series on YouTube created by Kane Parsons based on Valley View Center
