= North Dallas Chamber of Commerce =

The North Dallas Chamber of Commerce is a chamber of commerce located in north Dallas, Texas (USA). It has 900+ members and represents the business community interests in City of Dallas, Dallas County, and the State of Texas. It has long supported regional surface transportation and helped to get construction started for the Dallas North Tollway. More recently, the chamber has called for a two- to five-year repeal of the Love Field travel restrictions that are better known as the Wright Amendment.

In 1990, the High Tech Committee of the Chamber established the Kilby International Awards, named after inventor Jack Kilby. The awards were announced at the Chamber's annual "Salute to High Technology" dinners.
