= Railroad Rehabilitation and Improvement Financing =

The Railroad Rehabilitation and Improvement Financing (RRIF) program is a program established in the United States by the passage of the Transportation Equity Act for the 21st Century (TEA-21). Under the RRIF program, funds can be made available for the development or improvement of railroad infrastructure. The Federal Railroad Administration can provide direct loans or loan guarantees of amounts up to $3.5 billion to state or local governments, railroads, government sponsored companies, or railroad joint ventures.
