= Shiloh Road station =

Commuter rail station in Plano, Texas

Shiloh Road
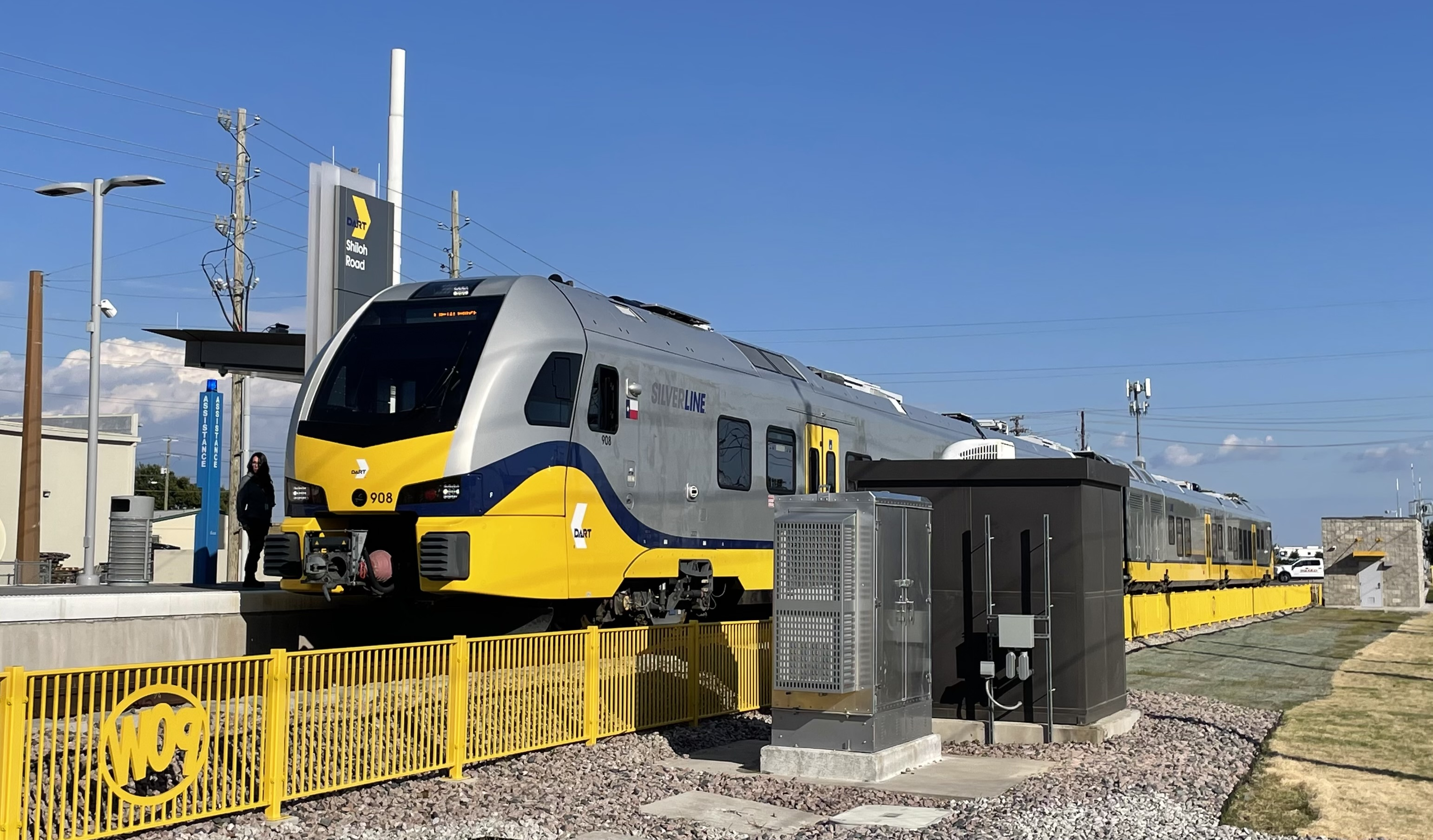

General information
- Location: 1101 Shiloh Road; Plano, Texas
- Coordinates: 33°00′45.0″N 96°39′54.6″W
- System: DART rail
- Owner: Dallas Area Rapid Transit
- Platforms: Island platform
- Tracks: 2
- Connections: DART: East Plano GoLink Zone (M-Sun), East Telecom GoLink Zone (M-Sun)

Construction
- Structure type: At-grade
- Parking: 672 spaces
- Accessible: Yes

History
- Opened: October 25, 2025; 9 months ago

Services
Preceding station	DART	Following station
12th Street toward DFW Airport Terminal B	Silver Line	Terminus
Location

Shiloh Road station is a DART Silver Line commuter rail station located in Plano, Texas. The station serves as the eastern terminus of the Silver Line.

The station is located at the intersection of 14th Street and Shiloh Road in an industrial park. In addition to serving the area, it serves as a park-and-ride lot for residents of eastern Plano, Murphy, and Wylie. The station is decorated with an electrical theme in reference to a nearby electrical substation. The Silver Line's maintenance facility is adjacent to the station.

== History ==
Shiloh Road station was first proposed in 2011 as part of the Cotton Belt Regional Rail Corridor. In 2012, the city of Plano purchased a 6.7-acre site for the station. In 2019, a groundbreaking was held for the line.

The station opened, alongside the rest of the Silver Line, on October 25, 2025.
