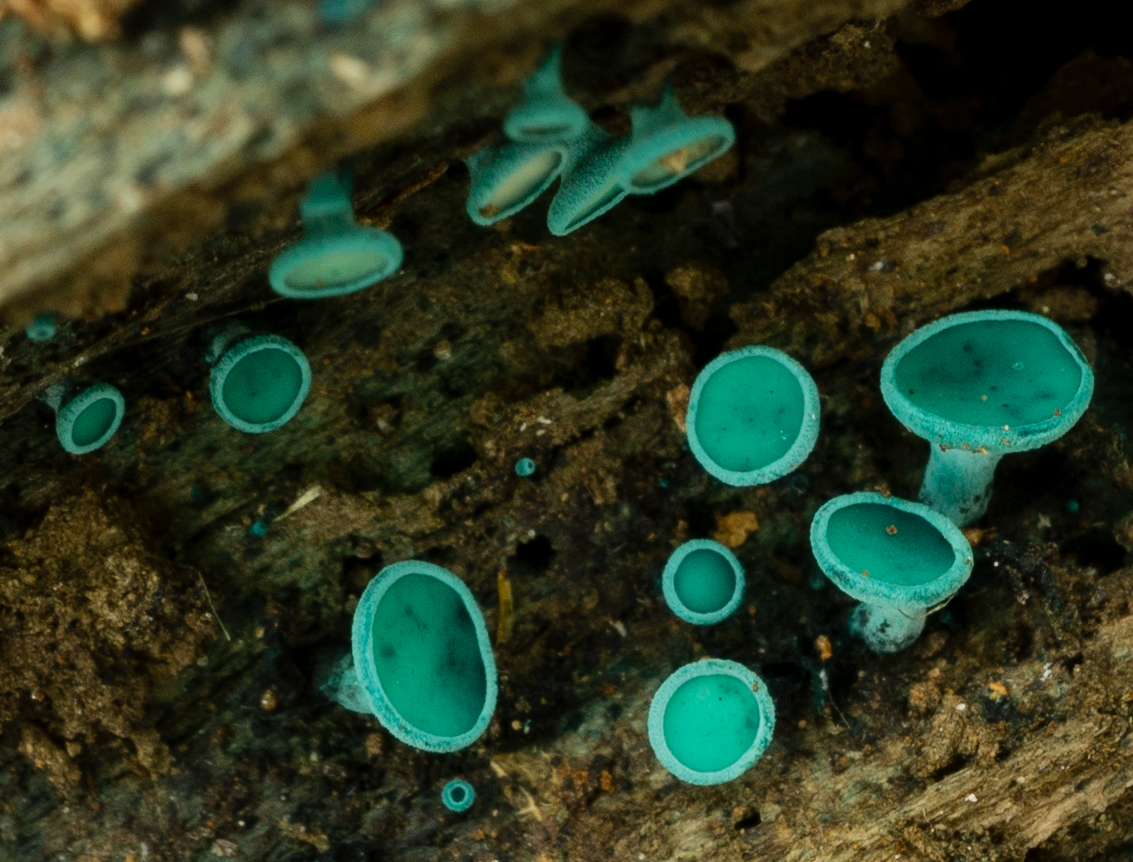
- The green elfcup, Chlorociboria aeruginosa.

Scientific classification
- Domain: Eukaryota
- Kingdom: Fungi
- Division: Ascomycota
- Class: Leotiomycetes
- Order: Helotiales
- Family: Chlorociboriaceae
- Genus: Chlorociboria
- Species: C. aeruginosa

Binomial name
- Chlorociboria aeruginosa (Oeder) Seaver

= Chlorociboria aeruginosa =

Species of fungus

Chlorociboria aeruginosa is a saprobic species of mushroom, commonly known as the green elfcup or the green wood cup because of its characteristic small, green, saucer-shaped fruit bodies (macroscopically identical to those of Chlorociboria aeruginascens, also described with those names). Although the actual fruit bodies are infrequently seen, the green staining of wood caused by the fungus is more prevalent.

== Description ==
This species has apothecia (cup-shaped ascocarps) that are usually attached laterally, often less than 0.5 cm in diameter, reaching 0.5-1 cm, collapsing laterally and becoming rolled inwards when dry. The outer tissue layer of the apothecium is bright green and smooth on the top, and felty and pale blue-green on the underside and stipe, darkening with age. The stipe is typically short, with a central or eccentric attachment to the apothecia. Spores are roughly spindle-shaped (fusiform), smooth, 9-14 x 2-4 μm. Spore print is white. Asci are eight-spored; typically 65 x 5 μm. Apothecia grow on bark-free wood, especially oak, beech and hazel, part of which at least is stained greenish by the mycelium.

The species is distinguished from the closely related C. aeruginascens by having bigger spores. Although some authors have in the past failed to recognize any appreciable differences between the two species, Ramamurthi and colleagues note that not only are the spore sizes different, but C. aeruginosa have roughened hyphae, in contrast with the smooth hyphae of C. aeruginascens.

== "Green oak" ==
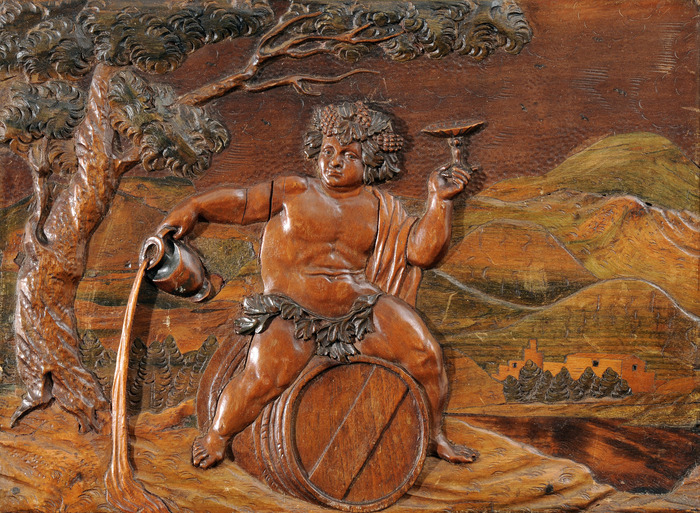
Cheb relief intarsia with green wood

Both C. aeruginosa and C. aeruginascens contain a quinone pigment called xylindein, a dimeric naphthoquinone derivative, whose structure was determined by spectroscopic means in the 1960s and later confirmed by X-ray crystallography. It is this compound that is responsible for the characteristic bluish-green stain of wood infected by thosespecies, used today in decorative woodworking such as Tunbridge ware and parquetry. The use of this wood, known as "green oak", goes back to 15th century Italy, where it was used in intarsia panels made by Fra Giovanni da Veroni.
