= Green Oak =

Green Oak or Green Oaks may refer to:

== Places ==
- Green Oak Township, Michigan, United States
- Green Oaks, Illinois, United States
- Green Oaks, Nova Scotia, Canada
- Green Oaks Boulevard, in Arlington, Texas, United States

== Other uses ==
- Green oak, oak infected by the fungus Chlorociboria aeruginascens or Chlorociboria aeruginosa
- Quercus floribunda, or green oak, a species of oak native to Afghanistan, Pakistan, India and Nepal

== See also ==
- Oak
- Greenock, a town in Inverclyde, Scotland
- Tortrix viridana, the green oak moth
