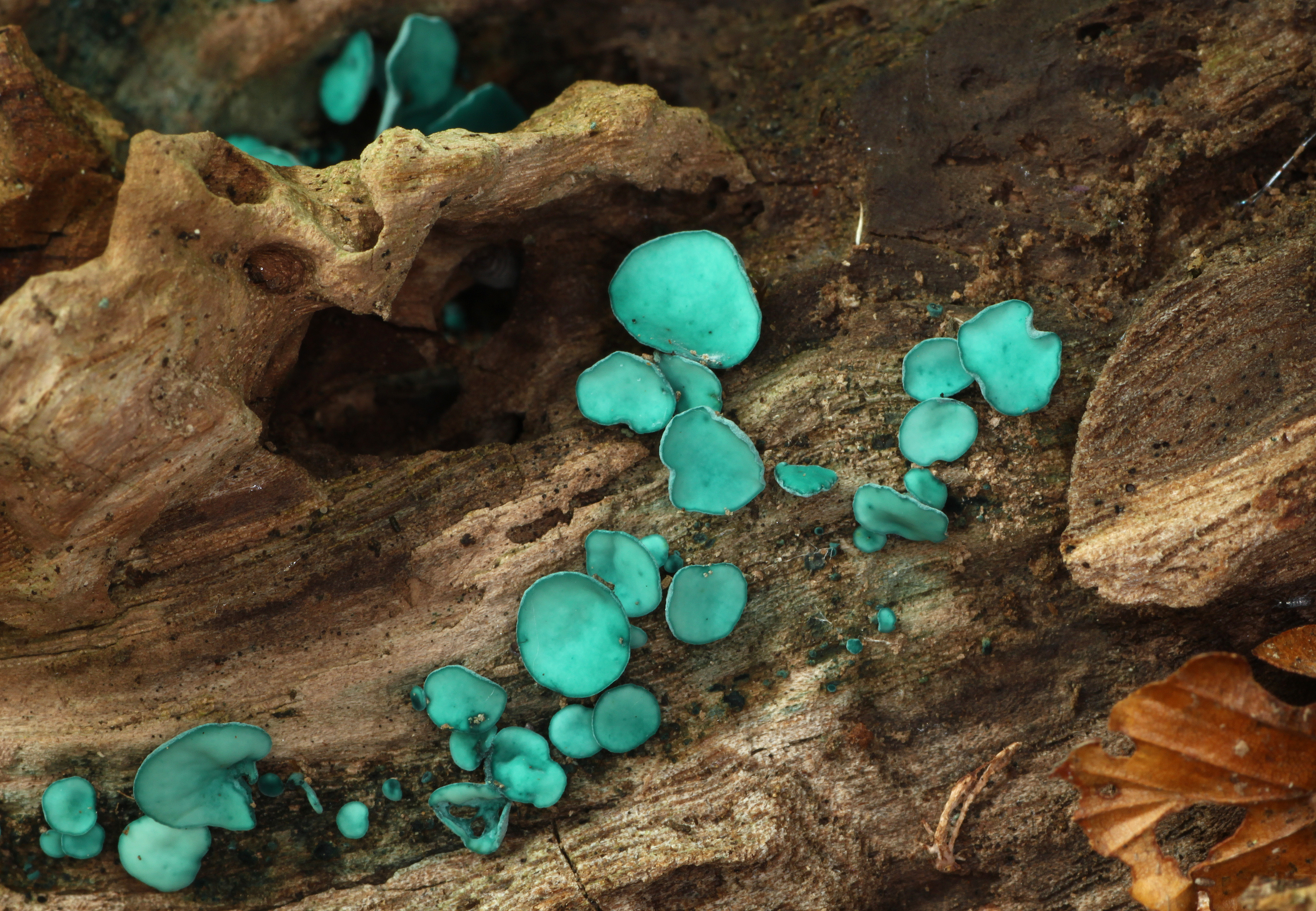
- Chlorociboria sp.

Scientific classification
- Kingdom: Fungi
- Division: Ascomycota
- Class: Leotiomycetes
- Order: Helotiales
- Family: Chlorociboriaceae
- Genus: Chlorociboria; Seaver ex Ramamurthi, Korf & L.R.Batra (1958)

Type species
- Chlorociboria aeruginosa (Oeder) Seaver ex C.S.Ramamurthi

Species
- 23, see text

= Chlorociboria =

Genus of fungi

Chlorociboria is the type genus of in the fungal family Chlorociboriaceae within order Helotiales. The genus includes 23 species.

Two common temperate zone species, Chlorociboria aeruginascens and Chlorociboria aeruginosa, can only reliably be distinguished by microscopic examination. Chlorociboria aeruginosa has larger spores (9–15 μm × 1.5–2.5 μm) and the worm-like cells of the outer surface are rough, unlike the commoner C. aeruginascens, of which the spores are 6–10 μm × 1.5–2 μm.

The hyphae and fruit bodies of most species make xylindein, a secondary metabolite that stains the substrate wood blue-green, with "green oak" being a valued commodity in woodworking. The blue-green pigmented wood is featured in Tunbridge ware.

== Habit ==
Blue-green stain is evident year-round, with ascocarp production occurring from summer to fall.

== Species ==
- Chlorociboria aeruginascens (Nyl.) Kanouse ex C.S.Ramamurthi, Korf & L.R.Batra (1958)
- Chlorociboria aeruginella (P. Karst) Dennis (1956)
- Chlorociboria aeruginosa (Oeder) Seaver ex C.S.Ramamurthi, Korf & L.R.Batra (1958)
- Chlorociboria ailaoensis H.L. Su, K.D. Hyde & Q. Zhao (2025)
- Chlorociboria albohymenia P.R.Johnst. (2005)
- Chlorociboria argentinensis J.R.Dixon (1975)
- Chlorociboria awakinoana P.R.Johnst. (2005)
- Chlorociboria bannaensis H.L. Su, K.D. Hyde & Q. Zhao (2025)
- Chlorociboria campbellensis P.R.Johnst. (2005)
- Chlorociboria clavula P.R.Johnst. (2005)
- Chlorociboria colubrosa P.R.Johnst. (2005)
- Chlorociboria daliensis C.J.Y. Li, K.D. Hyde & Q. Zhao (2022)
- Chlorociboria duriligna P.R.Johnst. (2005)
- Chlorociboria glauca (Dennis) Baral & Pärtel (2016)
- Chlorociboria halonata P.R.Johnst. (2005)
- Chlorociboria herbicola H.D.Zheng & W.Y.Zhuang (2017)
- Chlorociboria lamellicola Huhtinen & Döbbeler (2010)
- Chlorociboria laojunensis H.L. Su, K.D. Hyde & Q. Zhao (2025)
- Chlorociboria macrospora P.R.Johnst. (2005)
- Chlorociboria metrosideri P.R.Johnst. (2021)
- Chlorociboria musae Dennis (1959)
- Chlorociboria novae-zelandiae P.R.Johnst. (2021)
- Chlorociboria olivacea Ekanayaka & K.D.Hyde (2019)
- Chlorociboria omnivirens (Berk.) J.R.Dixon (1975)
- Chlorociboria pardalota P.R.Johnst. (2005)
- Chlorociboria poutoensis P.R.Johnst. (2005)
- Chlorociboria procera P.R.Johnst. (2005)
- Chlorociboria salviicolor (Ellis & Everh.) Korf (1979)
- Chlorociboria solandri P.R.Johnst. (2021)
- Chlorociboria spathulata P.R.Johnst. (2005)
- Chlorociboria spiralis P.R.Johnst. (2005)
- Chlorociboria subtilis P.R.Johnst. (2021)
- Chlorociboria yulongensis H.L. Su, K.D. Hyde & Q. Zhao (2025)

== See also ==
- Spalting
