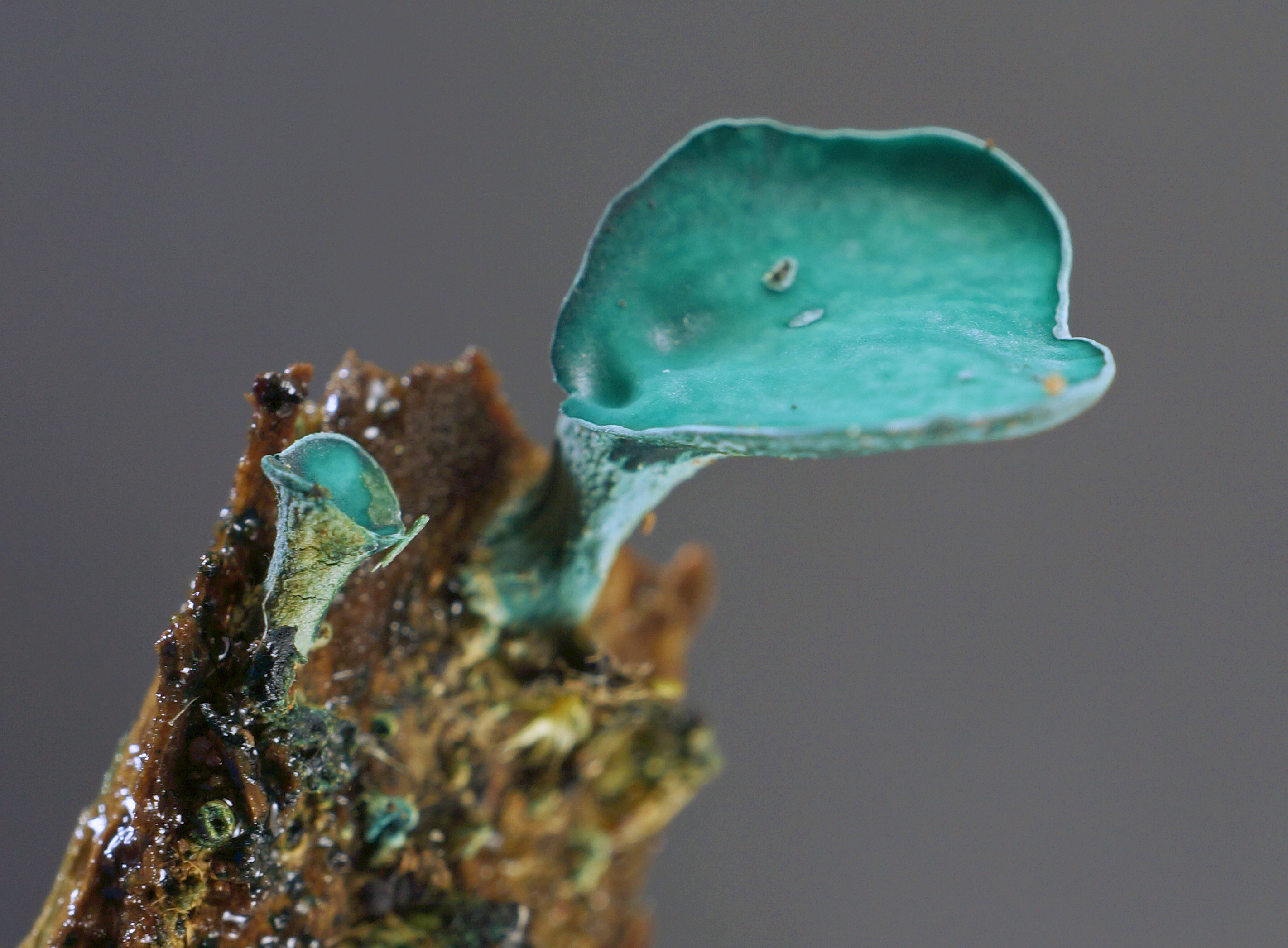
- The green elfcup, Chlorociboria aeruginascens

Scientific classification
- Kingdom: Fungi
- Division: Ascomycota
- Class: Leotiomycetes
- Order: Helotiales
- Family: Chlorociboriaceae
- Genus: Chlorociboria
- Species: C. aeruginascens

Binomial name
- Chlorociboria aeruginascens Kanouse ex C.S. Ramamurthi, Korf & L.R. Batra (1957)

Synonyms
- Chlorociboria aeruginascens (Nyl.) Kanouse; Chlorosplenium aeruginascens (Nyl.) P. Karst. Peziza aeruginascens Nyl.

= Chlorociboria aeruginascens =

Species of fungus

Chlorociboria aeruginascens
- Mycological characteristics
- Smooth hymenium
- No distinct cap
- Hymenium attachment is irregular or not applicable
- Stipe is bare
- Ecology is saprotrophic

Chlorociboria aeruginascens is a saprobic species of mushroom, commonly known as the blue stain, green elfcup or the green wood cup because of its characteristic small, green, saucer-shaped fruit bodies. The actual fruit bodies are infrequently seen, with the fungus usually observed through the green staining of wood it causes.

== Taxonomy ==
The specific epithet is derived from the Latin roots aerug- ("blue-green") and ascens ("becoming"). Some authors have used a variant spelling of the specific epithet, aeruginescens.

== Description ==
This species has apothecia (cup-shaped ascocarps) that are usually attached laterally, often less than 0.5 centimetres (1/4 in) in diameter, collapsing laterally and becoming rolled inwards when dry. The outer tissue layer of the apothecium, known as the ectal excipulum, has a delicate tomentose surface composed of hair-like, straight or sometimes coiled, smooth hyphae. The stipe is typically less than 3 mm long, with a central or eccentric attachment to the apothecia. The spores are roughly spindle-shaped (fusiform), smooth, and 5–8 by 0.7–2.8 μm. The spore print is white. Apothecia grow on bark-free wood, especially oak, part of which at least is stained greenish by the mycelium. The abundant paraphyses, which may be entwined, are 55–95 by 1.5–2 μm, filiform, and septate with an unswollen, unbent apex that often extends beyond the level of the asci tips.

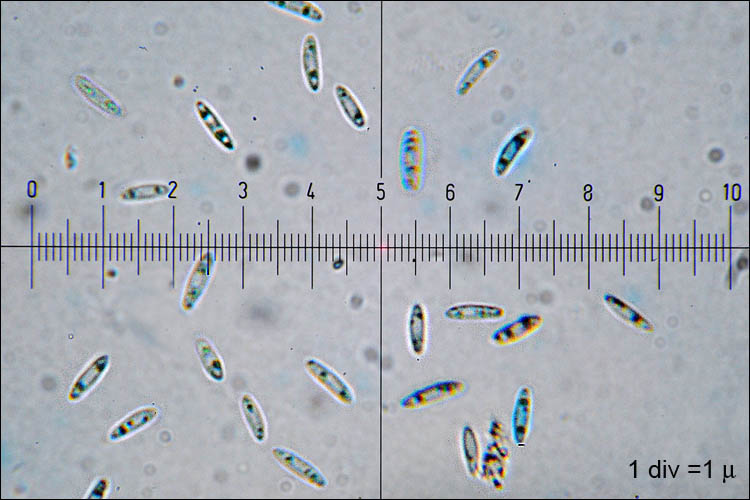
C. aeruginascens spores

=== Similar species ===
The species is distinguished from the closely related Chlorociboria aeruginosa by having smaller spores. Although some authors have in the past failed to recognize any appreciable differences between the two species, Ramamurthi and colleagues note that not only are the spore sizes different, but C. aeruginascens have smooth tomentum hyphae, in contrast with the roughened hyphae of C. aeruginosa.

== "Green oak" ==
This species contains a quinone pigment called xylindein, a dimeric naphthoquinone derivative, whose structure was determined by spectroscopic means in the 1960s and later confirmed by X-ray crystallography. It is this compound that is responsible for the characteristic bluish-green stain of wood infected by this species, used today in decorative woodworking such as Tunbridge ware and parquetry. The use of this wood, known as "green oak", goes back to 15th-century Italy, where it was used in intarsia panels made by Fra Giovanni da Veroni.

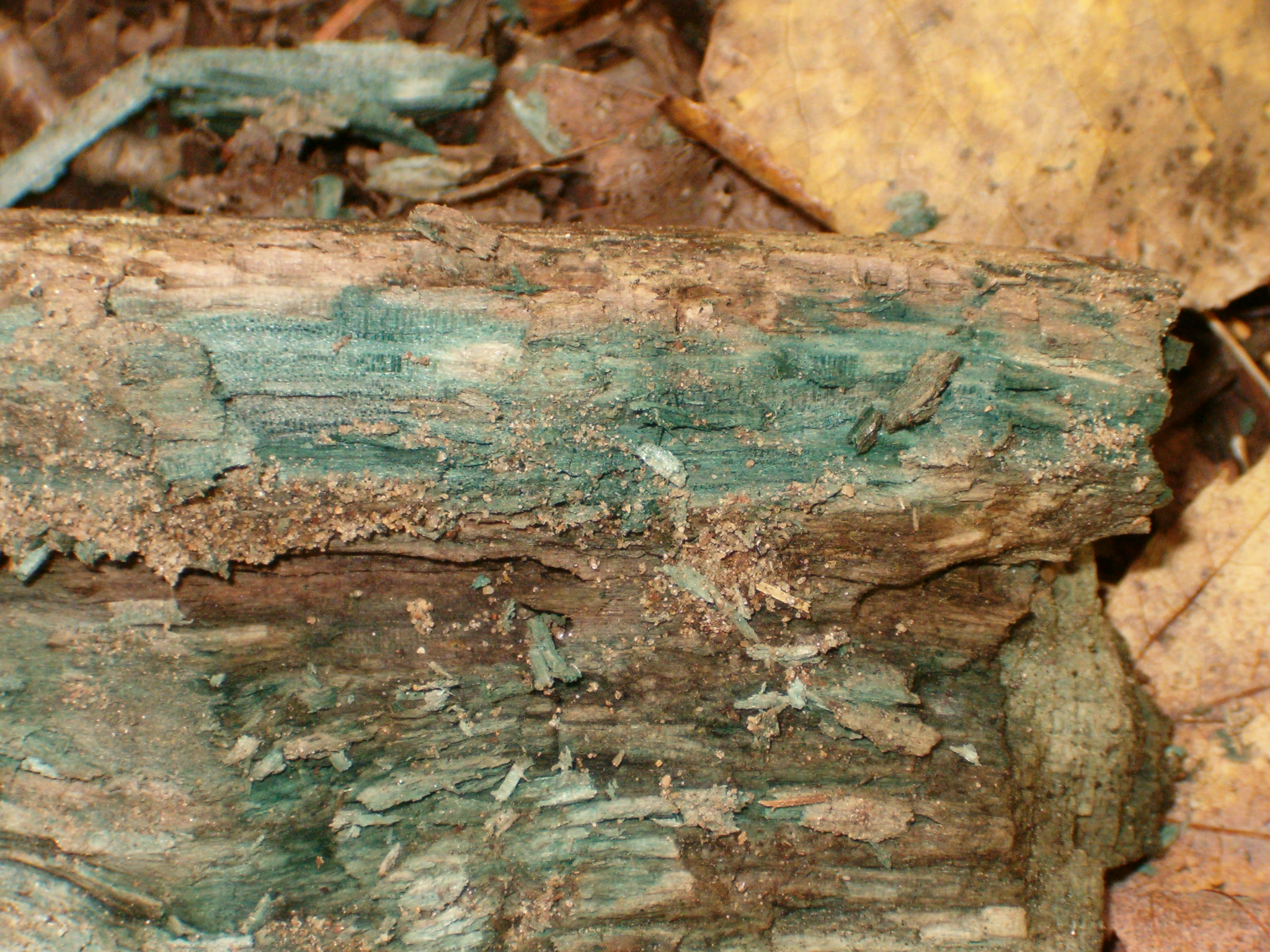
Green-stained wood suggestive of C. aeruginascens mycelium being present in the wood.

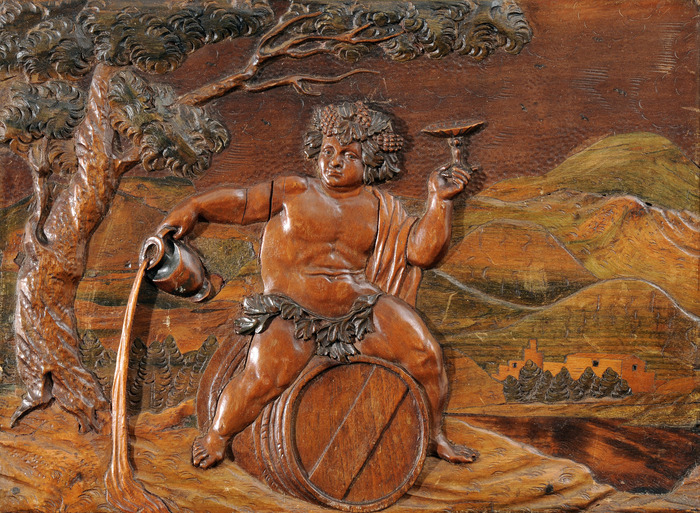
Cheb relief intarsia with green wood

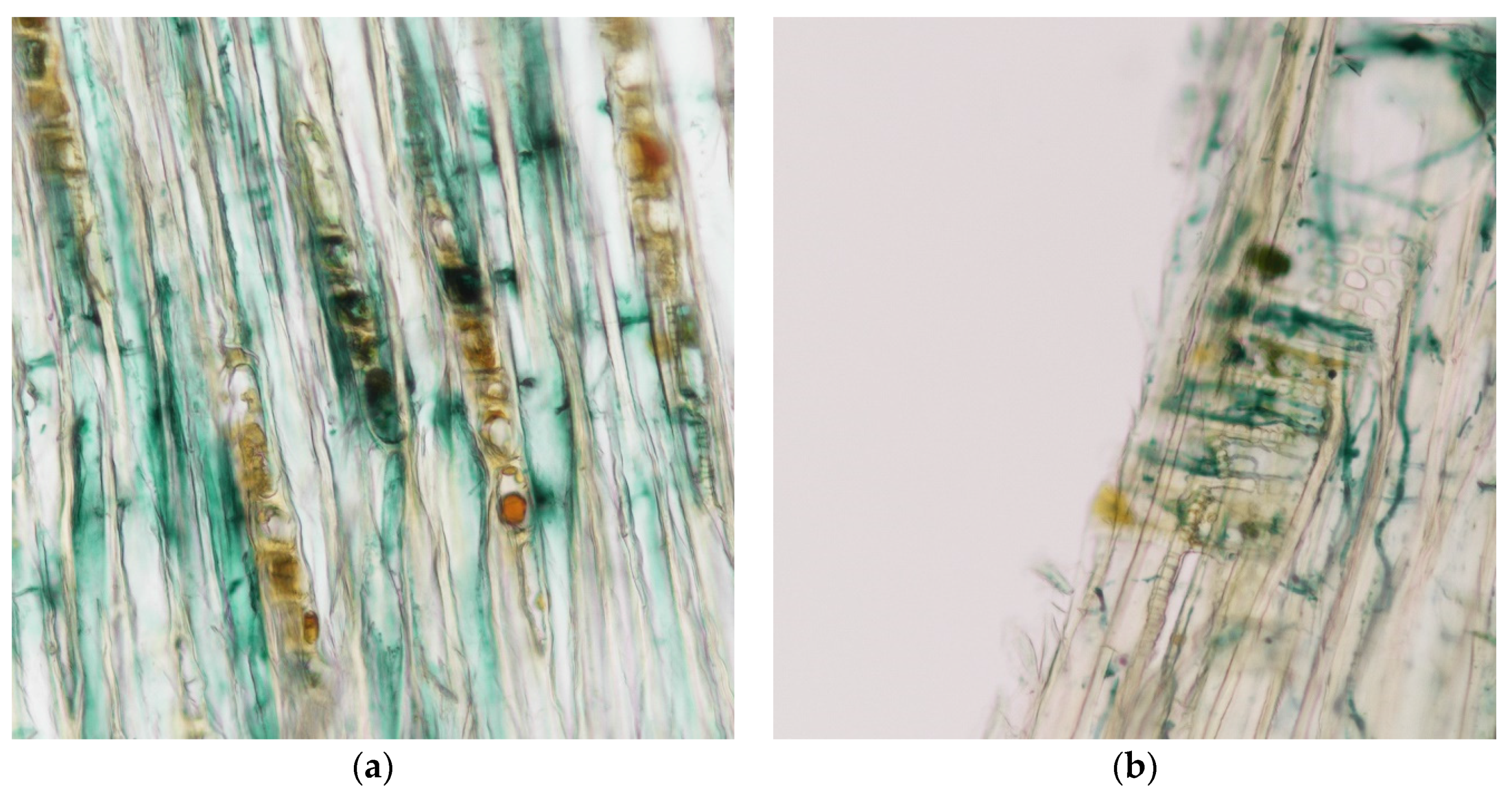
Microscopic images of a veneer of spalted poplar (Populus nigra) used in a tall case clock in the mid 1700s. (a) Tangential plane of veneer poplar showing mycelium expanding in ray cells (arrows), (b) Radial plane shows higher concentration of xylindein in rays than in fibers and vessels (arrows).
