= Chlorociboria omnivirens =

Scientific classification
- Domain: Eukaryota
- Kingdom: Fungi
- Division: Ascomycota
- Class: Leotiomycetes
- Order: Helotiales
- Family: Chlorociboriaceae
- Genus: Chlorociboria
- Species: C. omnivirens

Binomial name
- Chlorociboria omnivirens (Berk.) J.R.Dixon (1975)

Synonyms
- Peziza omnivirens Berk. (1860); Chlorosplenium omnivirens (Berk.) Cooke (1879)

Species of fungus

Chlorociboria omnivirens is a species of fungus in the family Chlorociboriaceae.
