= Chlorociboria procera =

Scientific classification
- Domain: Eukaryota
- Kingdom: Fungi
- Division: Ascomycota
- Class: Leotiomycetes
- Order: Helotiales
- Family: Chlorociboriaceae
- Genus: Chlorociboria
- Species: C. procera

Binomial name
- Chlorociboria procera P.R.Johnst. (2005)

Species of fungus

Chlorociboria procera is a species of fungus in the family Chlorociboriaceae. It is found in New Zealand.
