= Tunbridge =

Tunbridge may refer to the following places:

- Tunbridge, North Dakota, see Locations in the United States with an English name#North Dakota
- Tunbridge, Tasmania, Australia
- Tunbridge, Vermont, United States
- The old spelling of Tonbridge, Kent, England
  - Tunbridge (UK Parliament constituency)
- Royal Tunbridge Wells, Kent, England

== See also ==
- Tunbridge ware
- Tonbridge (disambiguation)
