= Yosegi-zaiku =

Traditional Japanese decorative woodworking technique

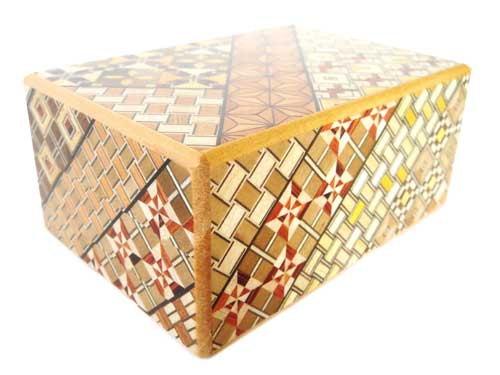
Japanese yosegi puzzle box

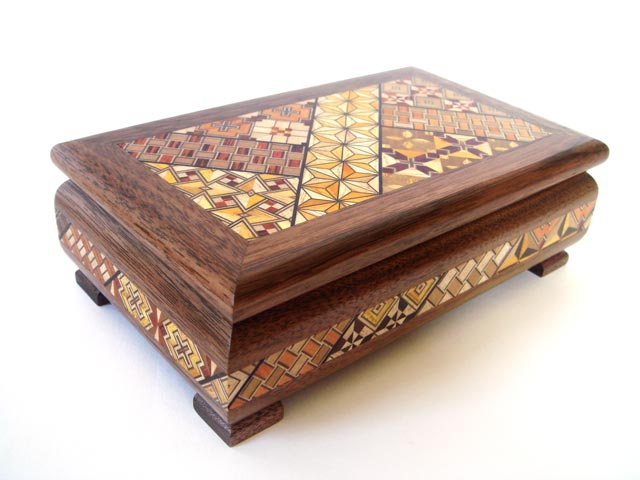
Japanese yosegi jewelry box

Yosegi-zaiku (寄木細工) (lit., "parquet work") is a type of traditional Japanese marquetry developed in the town of Hakone during the Edo period. Resembling a type of mosaic, yosegi is created through the combination of fine oblong rods of wood chosen for their grain, texture and colour, making an intricate surface pattern which is then sliced into thin layers. It is commonly found on traditional Japanese puzzle boxes and similar decorative items. In 1984 it was designated as one of the Traditional Crafts of Japan.

== Technique ==
The rods are glued together to form large sections of the desired geometric pattern, often called a seed plate, before being sliced into thin layers (in the zuku technique), which are then glued onto boxes and other handicraft works. Alternatively, the entire plate can be carved out (in the muku technique) to create a single piece. To add to the glaze and sturdiness of the surface, finishing coatings of lacquer are applied.

== Woods used ==
A number of different types of wood are used in the creation of yosegi-zaiku. Both the spindle tree (Euonymus spp.) and Ilex macropoda are used for the colour white; aged wood from the Katsura tree (Cercidiphyllum japonicum) is used for black; Picrasma quassioides, mulberry (Morus alba) and the Chinese lacquer tree (Toxicodendron vernicifluum) are used for yellow; the camphor tree (Cinnamomum camphora) and Maackia are used for brown, black walnut (Juglans nigra) for purple, the Japanese cucumber tree (Magnolia obovata) for blue and Chinese cedar (Toona sinensis) for red.

== Uses ==
Yosegi-zaiku is commonly found on the outside of traditional Japanese secret boxes or puzzle boxes, but may also be used to create or decorate many other items, such as trays, chests, jewelry boxes, vases, photo frames and drink coasters.

== See also ==
- Marquetry
- Tunbridge ware
