= Chlorociboria spathulata =

Scientific classification
- Domain: Eukaryota
- Kingdom: Fungi
- Division: Ascomycota
- Class: Leotiomycetes
- Order: Helotiales
- Family: Chlorociboriaceae
- Genus: Chlorociboria
- Species: C. spathulata

Binomial name
- Chlorociboria spathulata P.R.Johnst. (2005)

Species of fungus

Chlorociboria spathulata is a species of fungus in the family Chlorociboriaceae. It is found in New Zealand. It is a species of green algae that is commonly found on dead and decaying wood. It is sometimes referred to as "green stain fungi" because of the green pigment it produces, which can stain wood a distinctive shade of green. The species is often used as a model organism in studies of wood decay and wood-rotting fungi.
