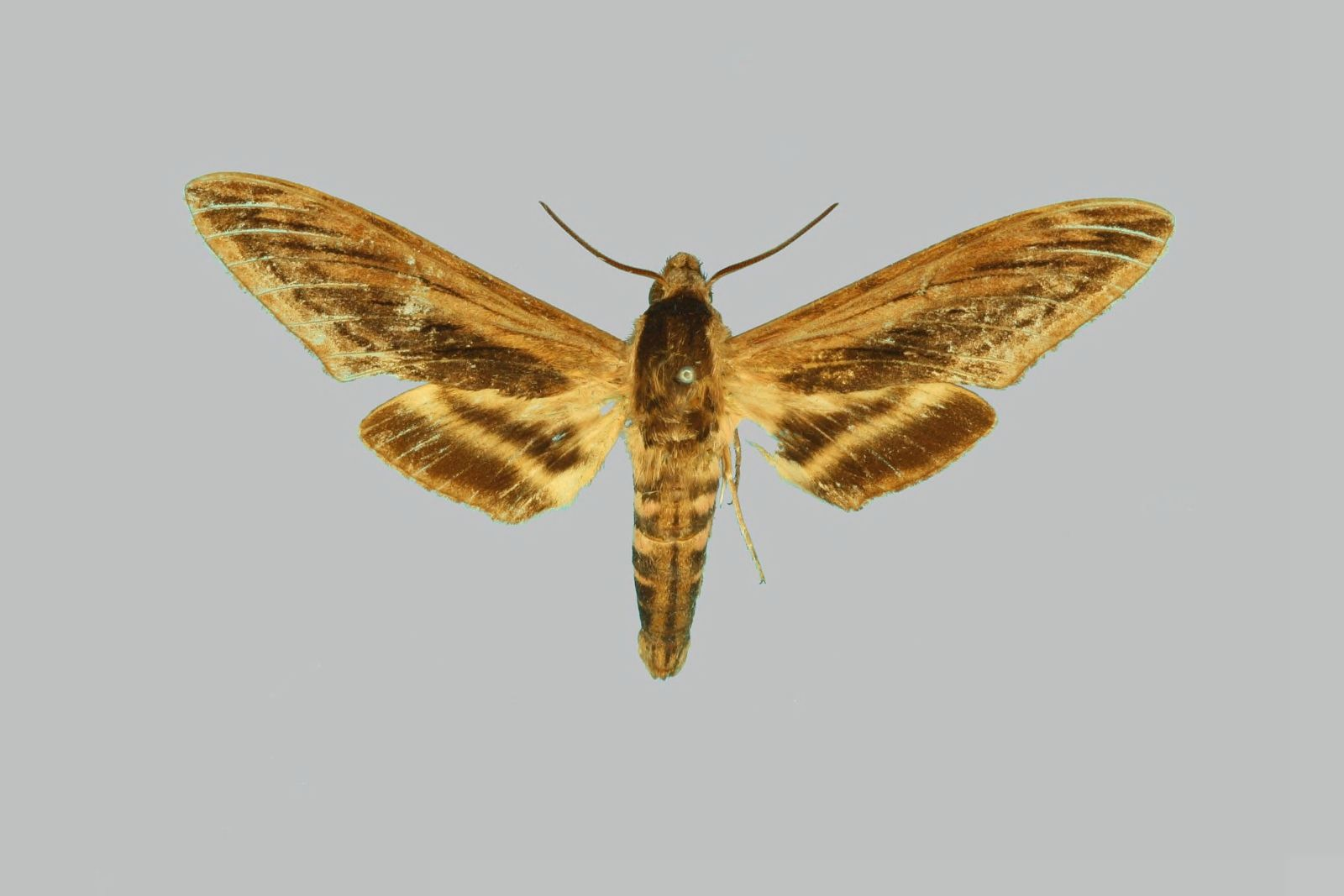

Scientific classification
- Kingdom: Animalia
- Phylum: Arthropoda
- Class: Insecta
- Order: Lepidoptera
- Family: Sphingidae
- Genus: Sphinx
- Species: S. constricta

Binomial name
- Sphinx constricta Butler, 1885

= Sphinx constricta =

Species of moth

Sphinx constricta, the Japanese privet hawkmoth, is a moth of the family Sphingidae. It is known from Japan.

The larvae feed on Enkianthus perulatus, Helwingia japonica, Ilex crenata, Ilex macropoda, Rhododendron, Spiraea salicifolia, Spiraea thunbergii, Viburnum dilatatum and Weigela hortensis.
