= Chlorociboria argentinensis =

Scientific classification
- Kingdom: Fungi
- Division: Ascomycota
- Class: Leotiomycetes
- Order: Helotiales
- Family: Chlorociboriaceae
- Genus: Chlorociboria
- Species: C. argentinensis

Binomial name
- Chlorociboria argentinensis J.R.Dixon (1975)

Species of fungus

Chlorociboria argentinensis is a species of fungus in the family Chlorociboriaceae. It is known from Argentina.
