= Tonbridge (disambiguation) =

Tonbridge may refer to:

== Places ==
- Tonbridge, a town in Kent, England, containing:
  - Tonbridge Grammar School, state-funded
  - Tonbridge School, independent
  - Tonbridge (UK Parliament constituency), current constituency
  - Tonbridge and Malling (UK Parliament constituency), former constituency
  - Tonbridge railway station
  - Tonbridge Angels F.C., a football club
  - Lowey of Tonbridge, an ancient tract of land in Kent and Surrey, centred on Tonbridge

== Ships ==
- SS Tonbridge, a cargo ship of the Southern Railway
- HMS Tonbridge, two ships of the Royal Navy

== See also ==
- Tunbridge (disambiguation)
- Tunbridge ware
