= Lath art =

Form of woodworking folk art

Lath art is a form of woodworking folk art for making rustic pictures out of strips of old "lath" from "plaster and lath" walls. Today it is commonly made from lattice, lumber stickers and weathered lobster traps. Beach scenes and rural scenes are the most popular themes.

== Techniques ==
Lath art has a lot in common with marquetry and intarsia. They are all woodworking hobbies to make pictures out of sections of wood, but marquetry and intarsia use the wood grain as a design element, and lath art uses the direction of the lath sticks and the colors of the stains as a design element.

== See also ==
- Parquetry
- Scroll saw
- Tunbridge ware
