= Marquetry =

Art and craft applying pieces of veneer to form decorative patterns

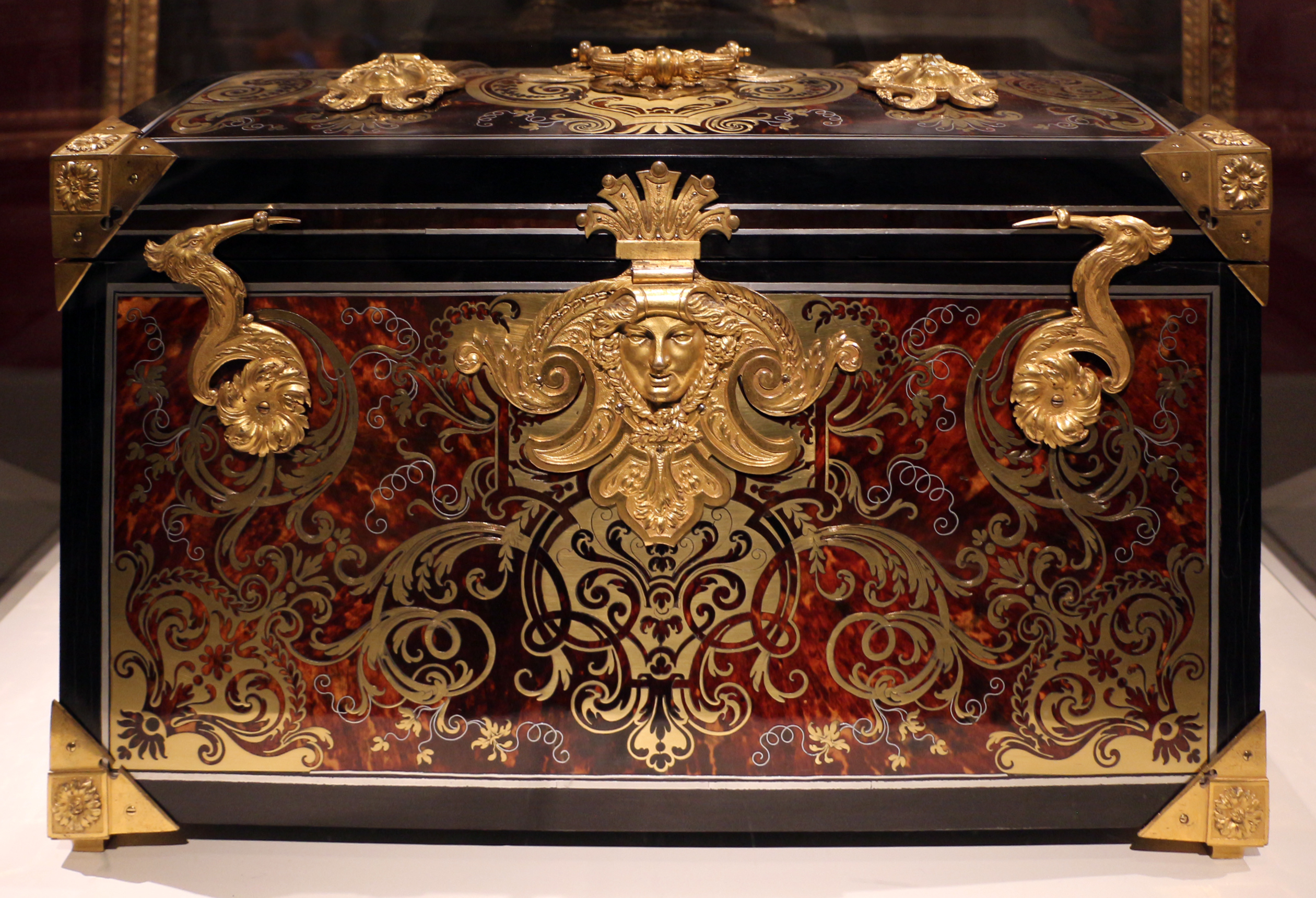
Casket, early 18th century, attributed to André-Charles Boulle, oak carcass veneered with tortoiseshell, gilt copper, pewter and ebony, in the Art Institute of Chicago

Marquetry (also spelled as marqueterie; from the French marqueter, to variegate) is the art and craft of applying pieces of veneer to a structure to form decorative patterns or designs. The technique may be applied to case furniture or even seat furniture, to decorative small objects with smooth, venerable surfaces or to freestanding pictorial panels appreciated in their own right.

Marquetry differs from the more ancient craft of inlay, or intarsia, in which a solid body of one material is cut out to receive sections of another to form the surface pattern. The word derives from a Middle French word meaning "inlaid work".

== Materials ==
The veneers used are primarily woods, but may include bone, ivory, turtle-shell (conventionally called "tortoiseshell" regardless of its source), mother-of-pearl, pewter, brass or fine metals. Marquetry using colored straw was a specialty of some European spa resorts from the end of the 18th century. Many exotic woods as well as common varieties can be employed, from the near-white of boxwood (Note: Boxwood turns golden-tan as it ages.) to the near-black of ebony; colors not found in nature can be achieved by applying dye to a veneer that retains stains well, such as sycamore.

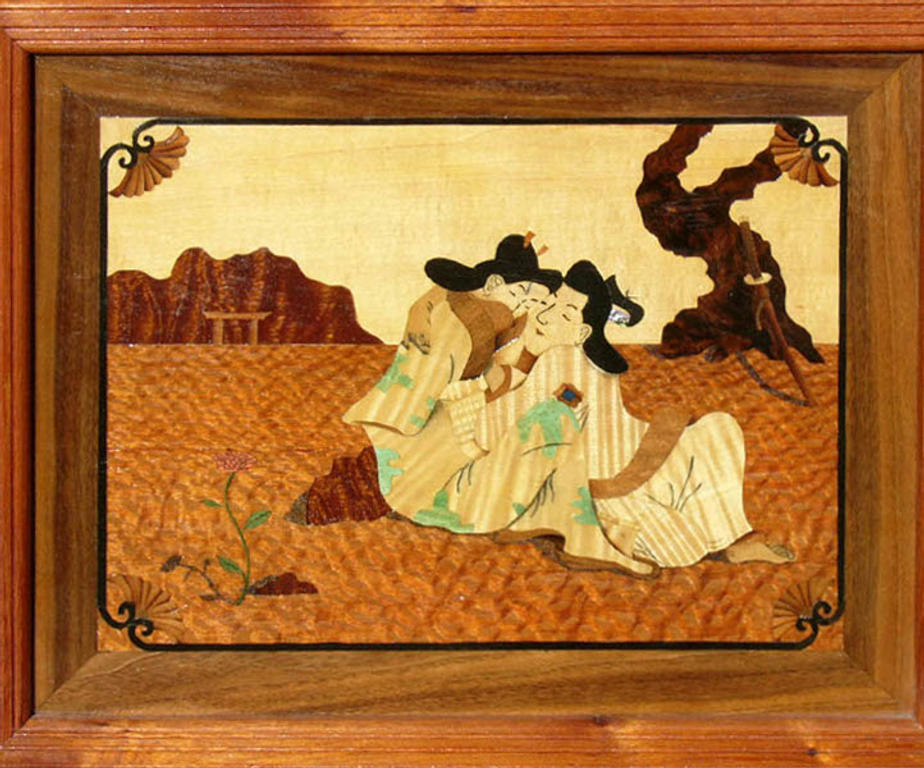
An example of sand-shading and shellac-inking; subject copied from a Moronobu print

The French cabinet maker André-Charles Boulle (1642–1732) specialized in furniture using metal and either wood or tortoiseshell together, the latter acting as the background.

The simplest kind of marquetry uses only two sheets of veneer, which are temporarily glued together and cut with a fine saw, producing two contrasting panels of identical design, (in French called partie and contre-partie, "part" and "counterpart").

Marquetry as a modern craft most commonly uses knife-cut veneers. However, the knife-cutting technique usually requires a lot of time. For that reason, many marquetarians have switched to fret or scroll saw techniques. Other requirements are a pattern of some kind, some brown gummed tape (this kind of tape is used because as its moistened glue dries the tape shrinks, pulling the veneer pieces closer together), PVA glue and a base-board with balancing veneers on the alternate face to compensate stresses. Finishing the piece will require fine abrasive paper, always backed by a sanding block. Choices of sealers and finishes that can be applied include ordinary varnish, special varnishes, polyurethane (either oil or water based), wax, and French polish.

Sand shading is a process used to make a picture appear to be more three-dimensional. A piece of veneer to be incorporated into a picture is partially submerged in hot sand for a few seconds.

Another shading process is engraving fine lines into a picture and filling them with a mixture of India ink and shellac.

== History ==
Furniture inlaid with precious woods, metals, glass and stones is known from the ancient world, as in Sumeria and Egypt. Roman examples have been recovered from the first century sites of Pompeii and Herculaneum demonstrating that the technique was highly advanced. The revival of the technique of veneered marquetry had its inspiration in 16th century Florence and at Naples ultimately from classical inspiration. Marquetry elaborated upon Florentine techniques of inlaying solid marble slabs with designs formed of fitted marbles, jaspers and semi-precious stones. This work, called opere di commessi, has medieval parallels in Central Italian "Cosmati"-work of inlaid marble floors, altars and columns. The technique is known in English as pietra dura, for the "hardstones" used: onyx, jasper, cornelian, lapis lazuli and colored marbles. In Florence, the Chapel of the Medici at San Lorenzo is completely covered in a colored marble facing using this demanding jig-sawn technique.

External videos
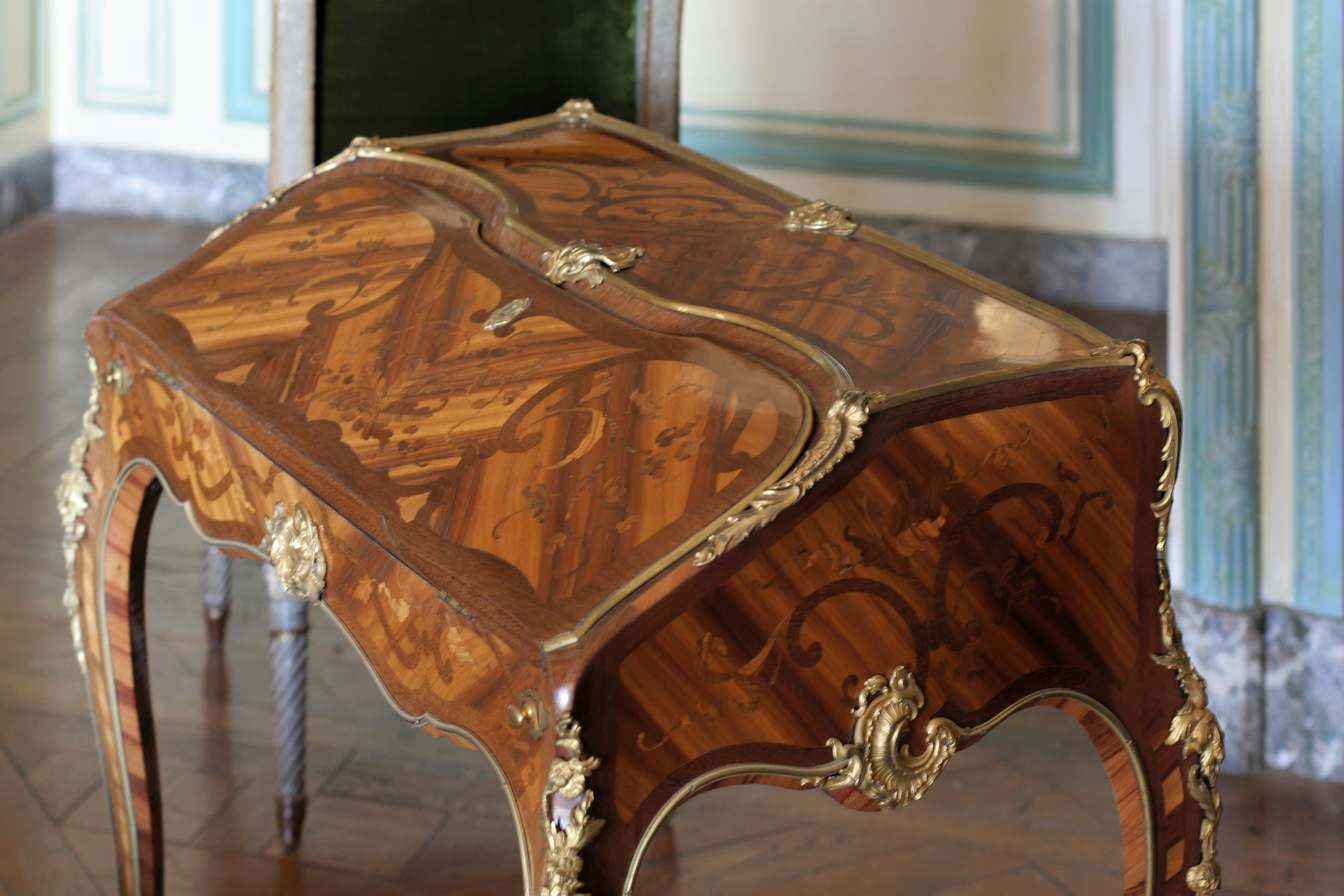
- The Inlay Technique of Marquetry, J. Paul Getty Museum
- LaunchPad: Roentgen Marquetry, Art Institute of Chicago

Techniques of wood marquetry were developed in Antwerp and other Flemish centers of luxury cabinet-making during the early 16th century. The craft was imported full-blown to France after the mid-seventeenth century, to create furniture of unprecedented luxury being made at the royal manufactory of the Gobelins, charged with providing furnishings to decorate Versailles and the other royal residences of Louis XIV. Early masters of French marquetry were the Fleming Pierre Gole and his son-in-law, André-Charles Boulle, who founded a dynasty of royal and Parisian cabinet-makers (ébénistes) and gave his name to a technique of marquetry employing tortoiseshell and brass with pewter in arabesque or intricately foliate designs. Boulle marquetry dropped out of favor in the 1720s, but was revived in the 1780s. In the decades between, carefully matched quarter-sawn veneers sawn from the same piece of timber were arranged symmetrically on case pieces and contrasted with gilt-bronze mounts. Floral marquetry came into favor in Parisian furniture in the 1750s, employed by cabinet-makers like Bernard II van Risamburgh, Jean-Pierre Latz and Simon-François Oeben. The most famous royal French furniture veneered with marquetry are the pieces delivered by Jean Henri Riesener in the 1770s and 1780s. The Bureau du Roi was the most famous amongst these famous masterpieces.

Marquetry was not ordinarily a feature of furniture made outside large urban centers. Nevertheless, marquetry was introduced into London furniture at the Restoration of Charles II in 1660, the product of immigrant Dutch 'inlayers', whose craft traditions owed a lot to Antwerp. Panels of elaborately scrolling "seaweed" marquetry of box or holly contrasting with walnut appeared on table tops, cabinets, and long-case clocks. At the end of the 17th century, a new influx of French Huguenot craftsmen went to London, but marquetry in England had little appeal in the anti-French, more Chinese-inspired high-style English furniture (mis-called 'Queen Anne') after c. 1720. Marquetry was revived as a vehicle of Neoclassicism and a 'French taste' in London furniture, starting in the late 1760s. Cabinet-makers associated with London-made marquetry furniture, 1765–1790, include Thomas Chippendale and less familiar names, like John Linnell, the French craftsman Pierre Langlois, and the firm of William Ince and John Mayhew.

Modern marquetry: a tangram table by Silas Kopf, with trompe-l'œil images of paper and brush made entirely of different shades of flat veneer

Although marquetry is a technique separate from inlay, English marquetry-makers were called "inlayers" throughout the 18th century. In Paris, before 1789, makers of veneered or marquetry furniture (ébénistes) belonged to a separate guild from chair-makers and other furniture craftsmen working in solid wood (menuisiers).

Tiling patterning has been more highly developed in the Islamic world than anywhere else, and many extraordinary examples of inlay work have come from Middle Eastern countries such as Lebanon and Iran.

In Tonbridge and Royal Tunbridge Wells, England, souvenir "Tunbridge wares"—small boxes and the like—made from the mid-18th century onwards, were veneered with panels of minute wood mosaics, usually geometric, but which could include complicated subjects like landscapes. They were made by laboriously assembling and gluing thin strips and shaped rods, which then could be sliced crossways to provide numerous mosaic panels all of the same design.

Marquetry was a feature of some centers of German cabinet-making from c. 1710. The craft and artistry of David Roentgen, Neuwied, (and later at Paris as well) was unsurpassed, even in Paris, by any 18th-century marquetry craftsman.

Marquetry was not a mainstream fashion in 18th-century Italy, but the neoclassical marquetry of Giuseppe Maggiolini, made in Milan at the end of the century is notable.

The classic illustrated description of 18th-century marquetry-making was contributed by Roubo to the Encyclopédie des Arts et Métiers, 1770.

== New techniques ==
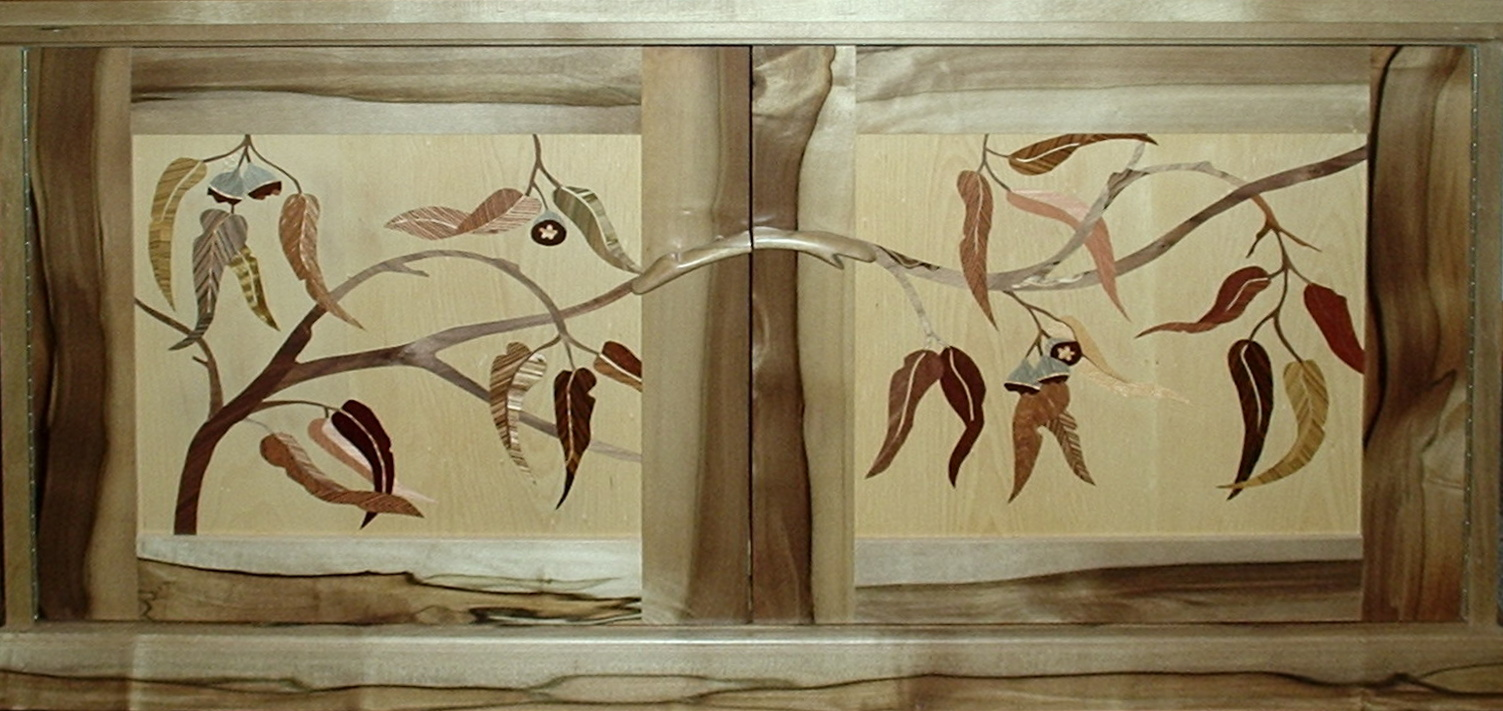
Modern marquetry cabinet made from Tasmanian timbers

During the 1980s Georges Vriz developed a technique called VRIZ, layering two veneer layers on top of each other and sanding through the top one, to the point of fiber transparency. This has been used mainly in France, by professionals and marquetry students of the École Boulle. With its technique, Georges Vriz promoted a resurgence of the marquetry he called RENAISSANCE. He launched the contemporary marquetry. In the US the technique has been used at the American School of French Marquetry by one of the teachers, artist Patrice Lejeune. The school staff is also proposing a new name for it: "Given that 'piercing' is an unfortunate mistake in the veneering world, we chose to use the word "Fusion" instead, by which term the artist expresses his intention of sanding through the veneer as a decorative, textural effect, not as a mistake."

Cutting-edge tech has also been applied to marquetry. Among these is laser cutting, where the design is drawn or imported as a CAD or vector file and each piece is cut separately; each different species of wood-and thickness-may need a specific adjustment of the beam power; the offset will determine the gap between the pieces. In some cases, the beam will leave a dark edge due to the high heat required by the process.

== Gallery ==
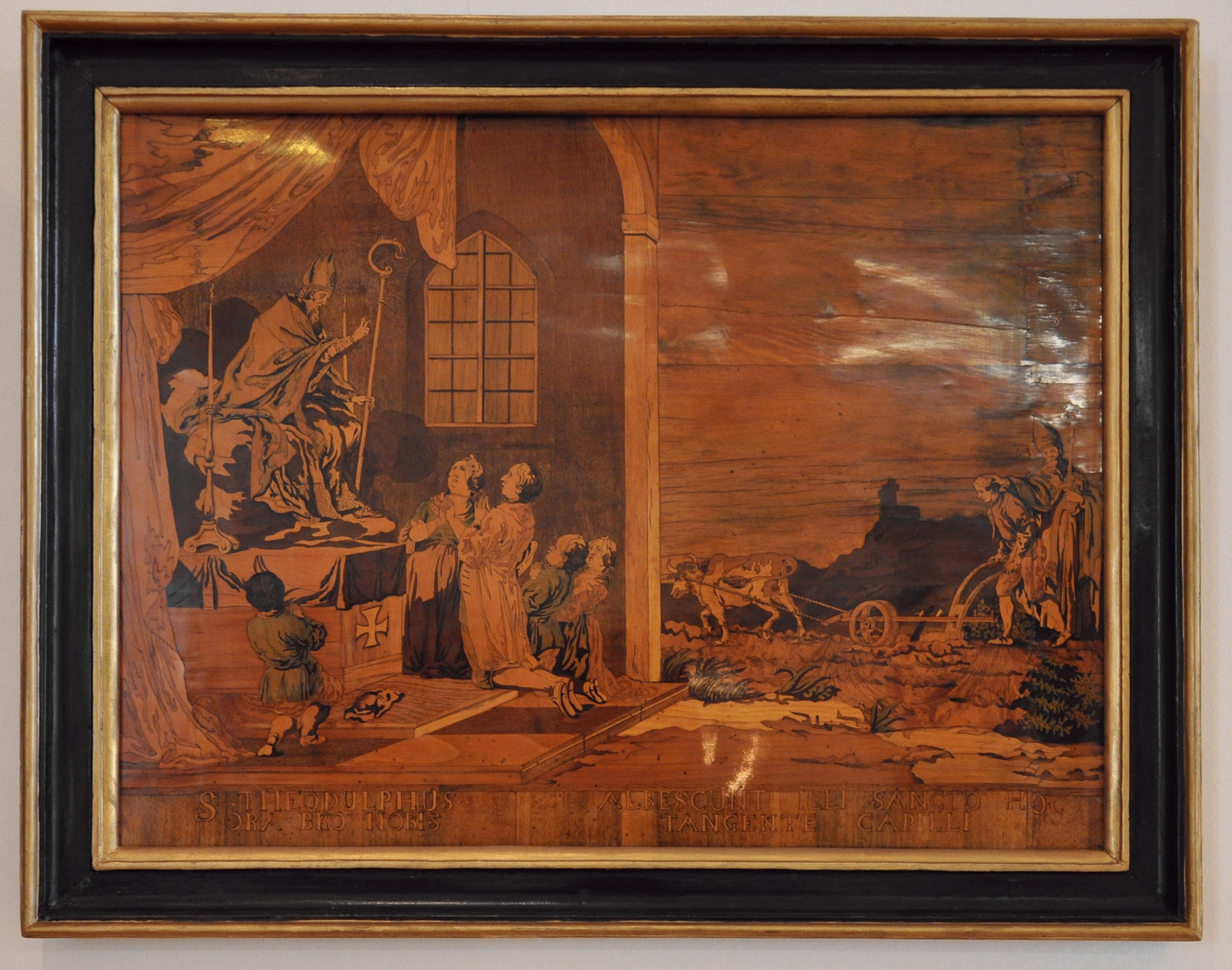
Marquetry picture, Germany 1776

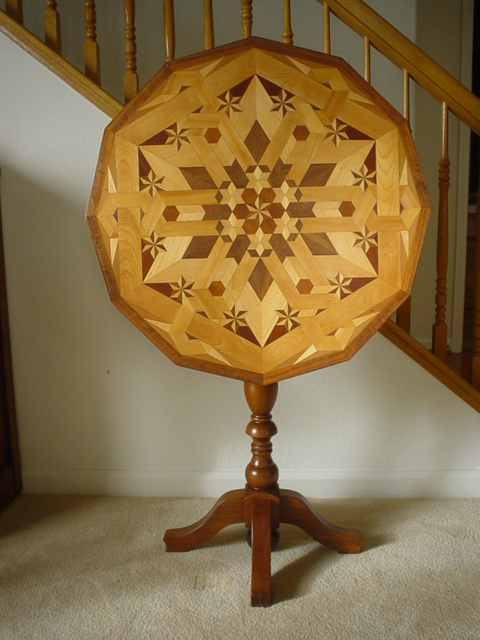
Tip-top table veneered in a parquetry pattern by Isaac Leonard Wise, circa 1934

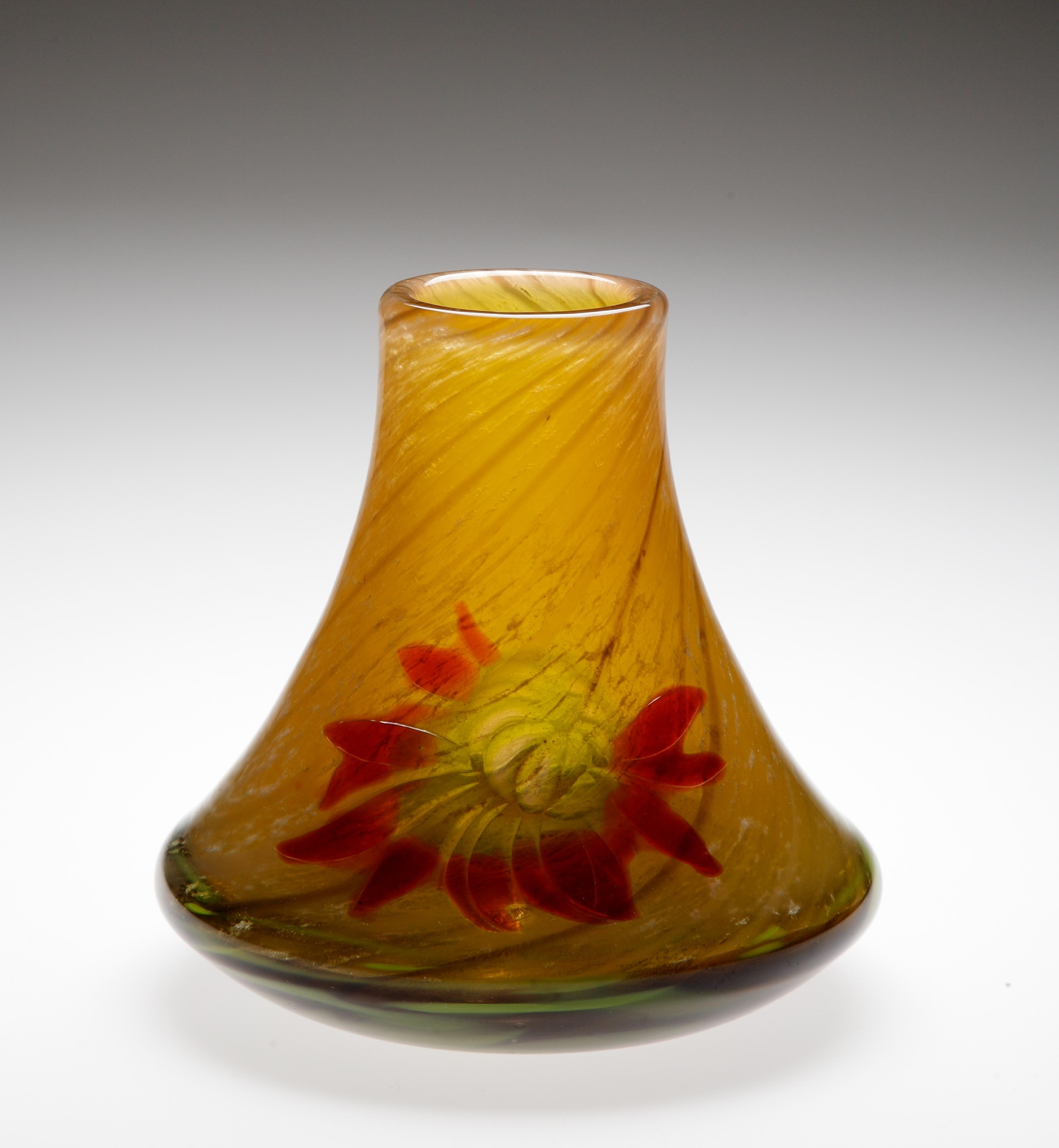
Glass vas Dahlia designed by Betzy Ählström 1912, made in the marqueterie de verre technique developed by Émile Gallé

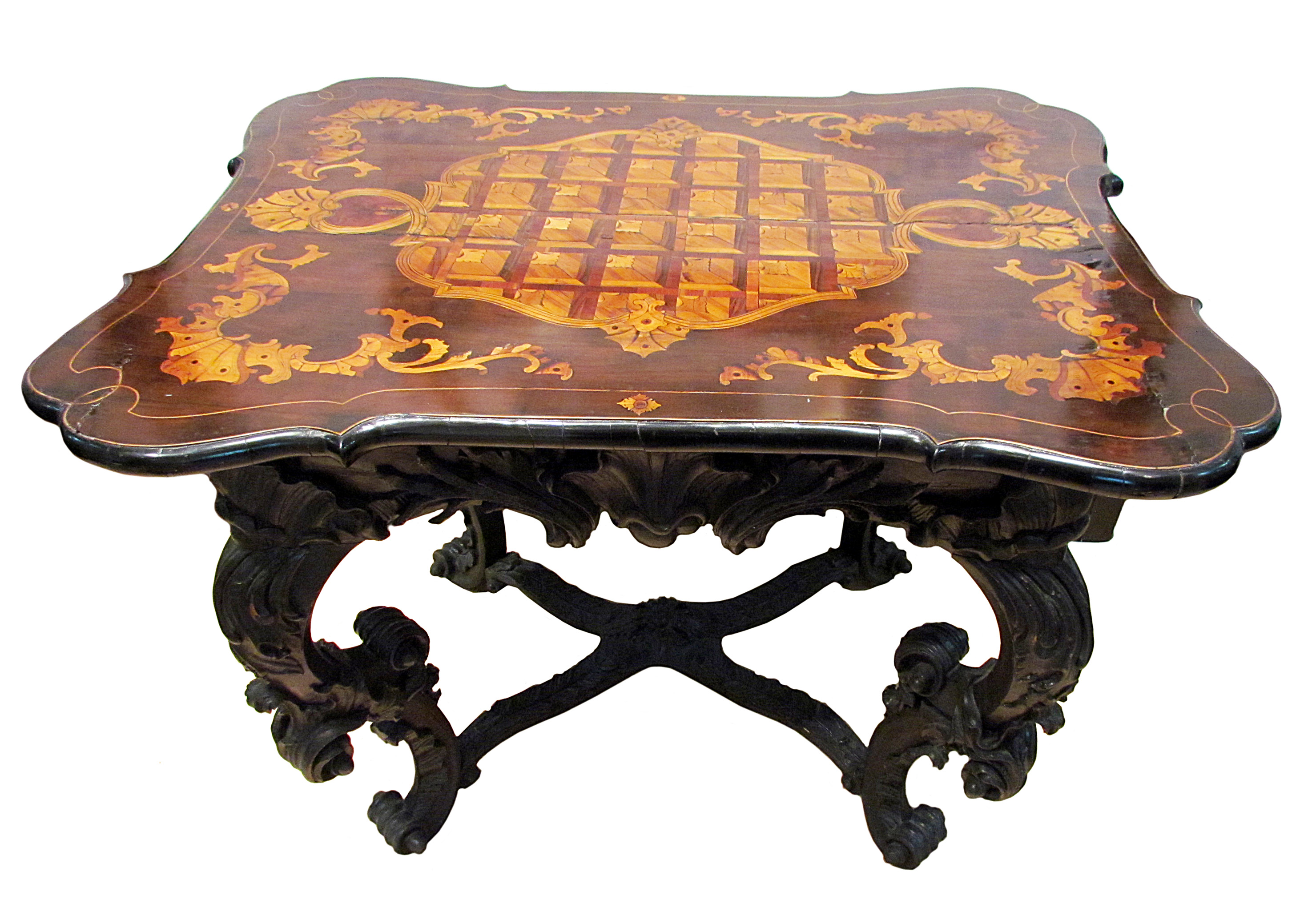
Table with marquetry top (as evidenced by cracking joints on left and right of top, but having wood grain carry on to both cleats indicating the surface is veneered) Mihailo Obrenović, Prince of Serbia

== See also ==
- Parquetry
- Woodworking
- Lath art
- Khatam
- Intarsia
- Damascening
- Tunbridge ware
- Yosegi
- Charles Spindler
