= Straw marquetry =

Craft imitating wood marquetry with straw

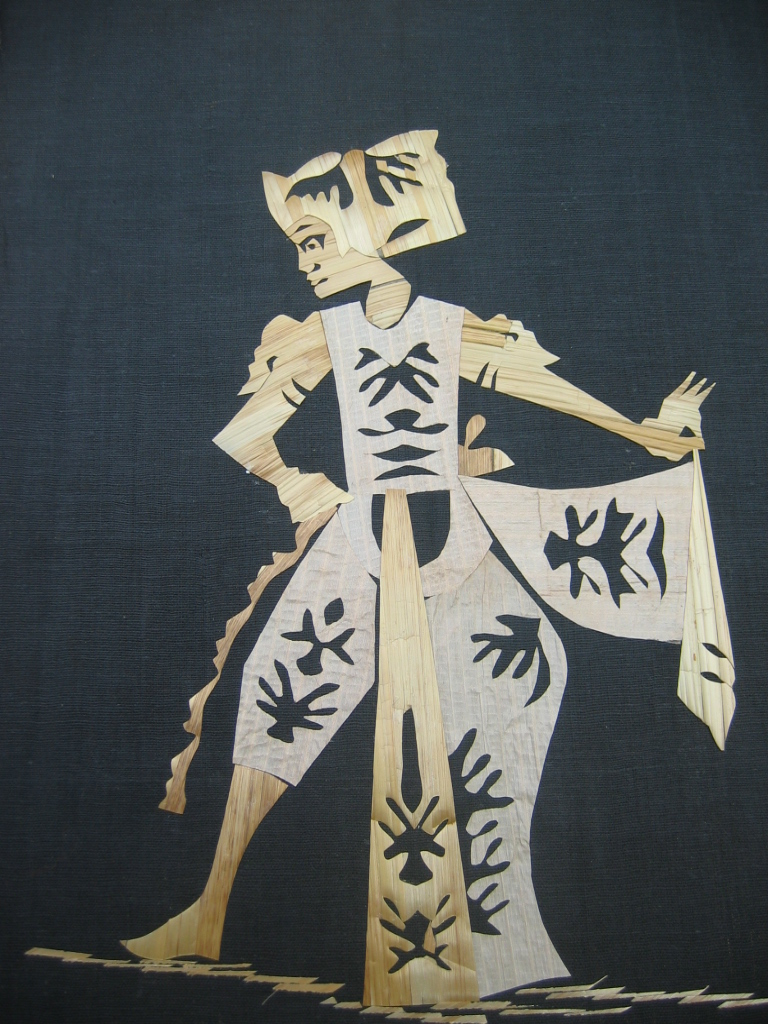
Oriental marquetry motif

Straw marquetry is a craft very similar to wood marquetry, except that straw replaces the wood veneer. It is thought to have first been practised in Asia, and examples were brought to Europe in the 17th century.

To mimic the varying shades of wood veneer, wheat or oat straw is split, then soaked in cold, warm, or hot water. The strips are then ironed, and there will be a variety of tones, from pale gold to dark brown.

There are accounts of nuns in France and Switzerland making a variety of items using straw marquetry.

The most famous straw marquetry was practised by prisoners of war from the Napoleonic Wars. Dartmoor and other prisons had been built for the prisoners. The prison most famous for straw marquetry was Norman Cross, Huntingdon.

In a related craft, Easter eggs are decorated with straw applique, especially in Eastern European countries. Geometric shapes, stars, and flower motifs are common themes. There is a slight difference in the way the straw is prepared, however. For marquetry, the straws are soaked, split, and ironed; for egg decoration, the straw is not ironed.

== See also ==
- Corn dolly, Straw, Oat, Wheat, Barley, Rye, Easter egg

== Photo gallery ==
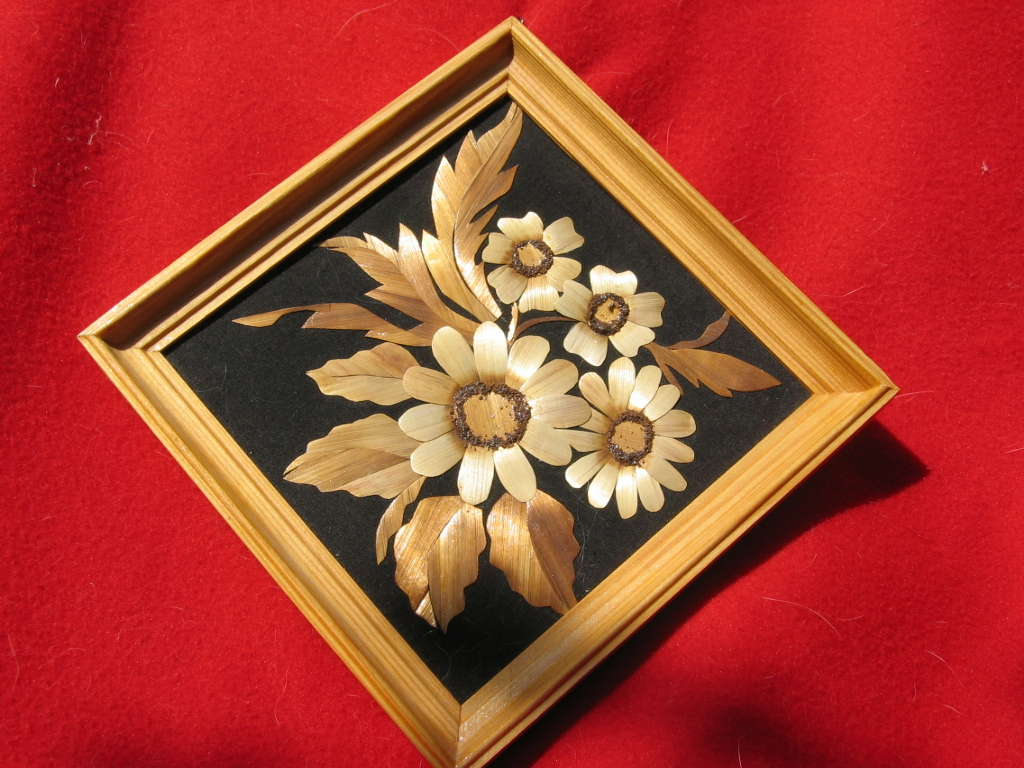

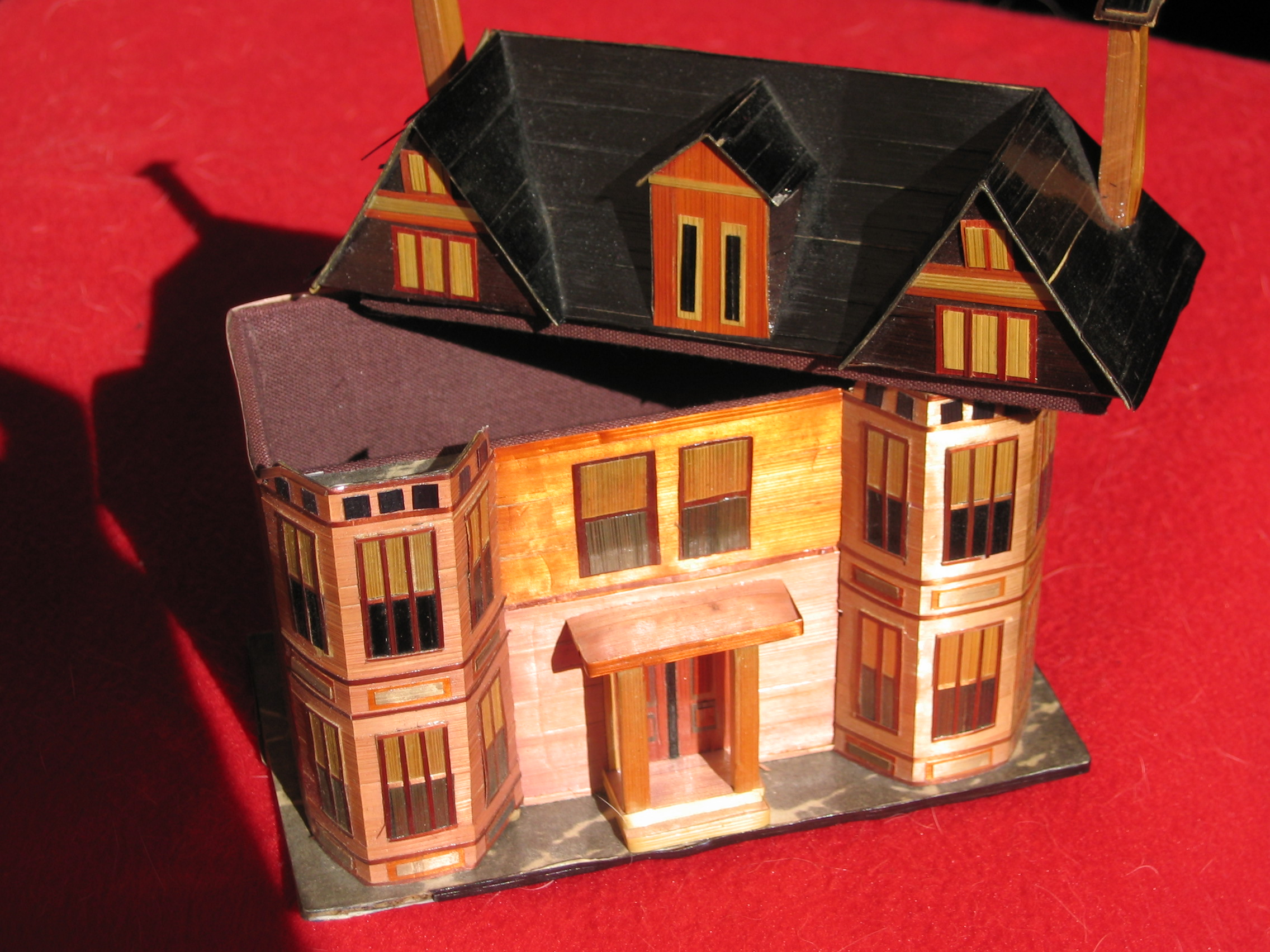

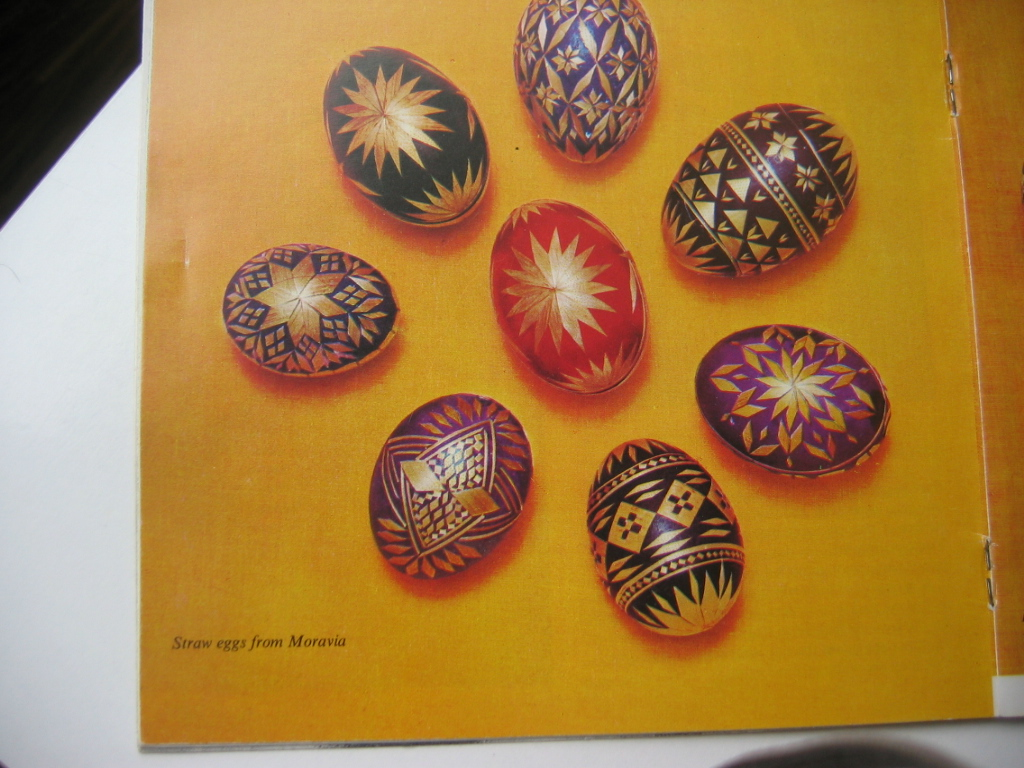

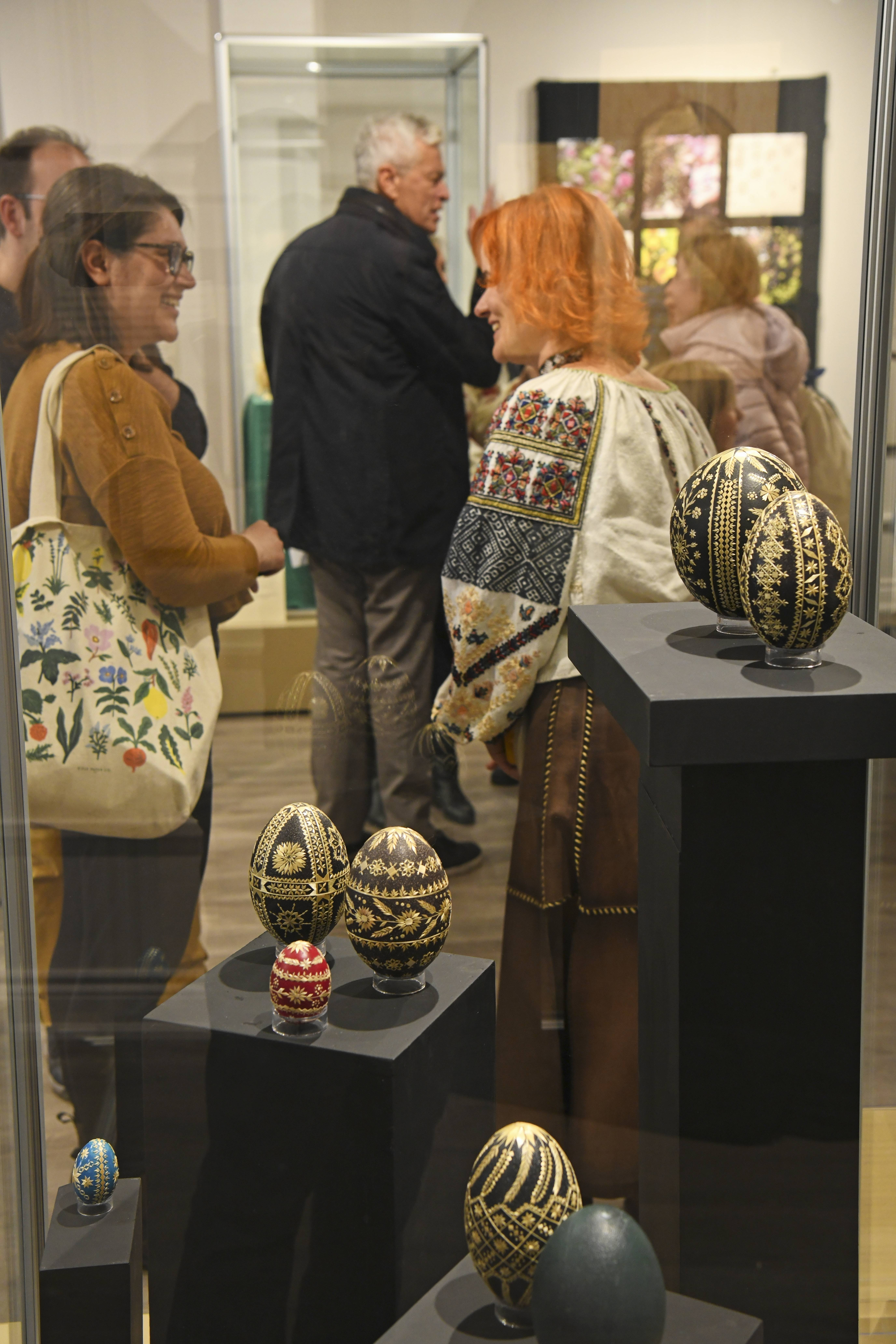
