= Silas Kopf =

American furniture maker (born 1949)

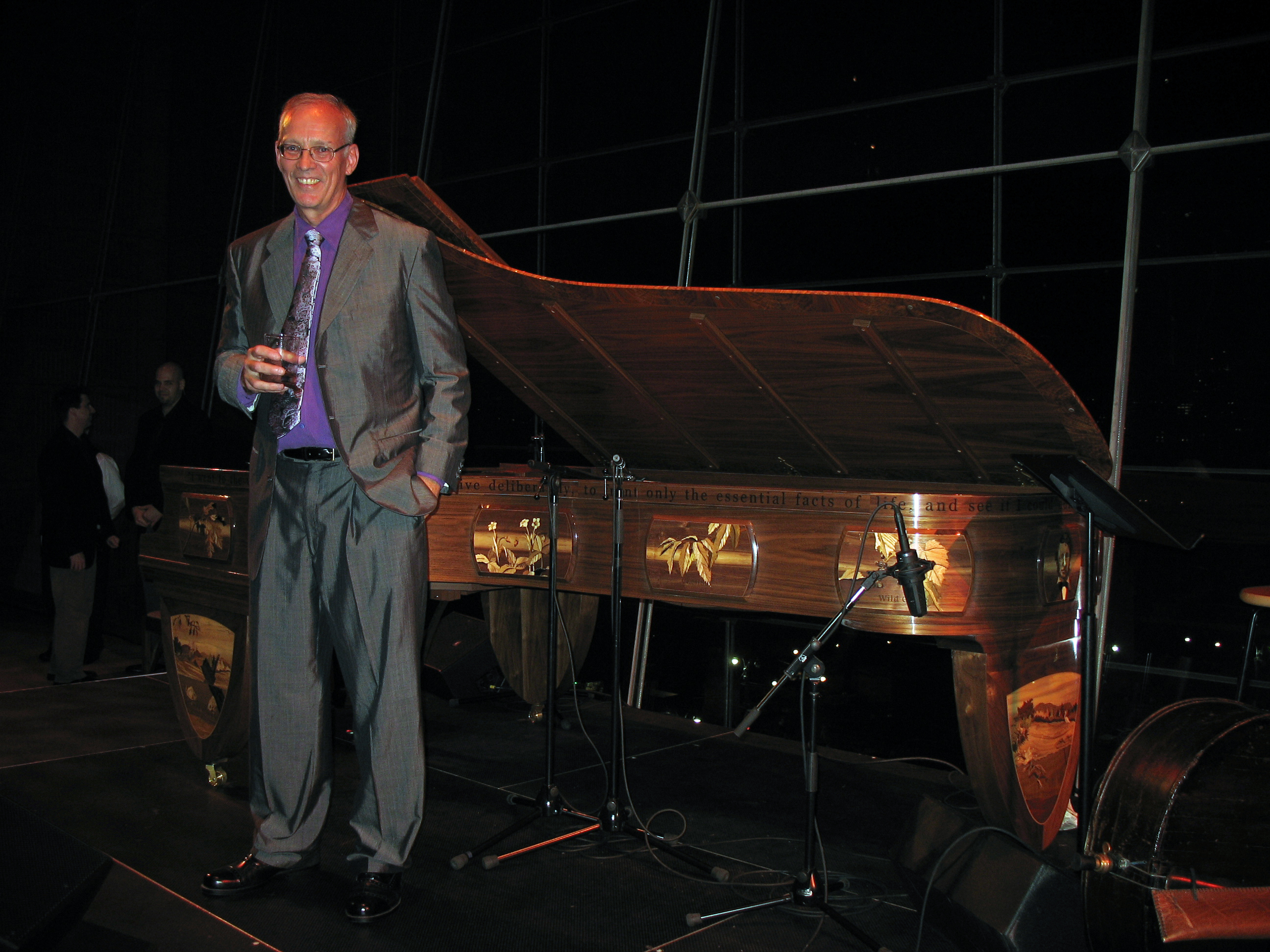
Marquetry woodworker Silas Kopf, standing in front of Walden Piano

Marquetry tangram table by Silas Kopf at the Peabody Essex Museum in Salem, Massachusetts with trompe-l'œil images of paper and pencil made entirely of different shades of flat veneer.

Silas Kopf (born 1949) is an American furniture maker, specializing in the art of marquetry.

== Life and career ==
Silas Kopf graduated from Princeton University in 1972, with a degree in architecture and soon began designing and making furniture. In 1988, he received a Craftsman's Fellowship from the National Endowment for the Arts, and used the opportunity to study traditional marquetry technique at the École Boulle, an institute of interior architecture and design, in Paris.

His major projects include several pianos commissioned by Steinway & Sons and benches, desks, and cabinets for private collections and museums. His designs frequently incorporate floral depictions, other images from nature, and trompe-l'œil concepts. He first became interested in marquetry because he hoped for an alternative, less consumerist lifestyle.

Kopf was named Master of the Medium by the James Renwick Alliance of the Smithsonian Institution for 2015. This biennial award recognizes American craftspeople in the fields of wood, ceramics, glass, metal, and fiber.

Since 1978, he has worked in Easthampton, Massachusetts, where he continues to build and design. He has an assistant, Tom Coughlin, who also designs and builds guitars.

In 2026, Kopf was named a fellow by the American Craft Council (ACC).
