= Paul Thénard =

French chemist and wine producer (1819–1884)

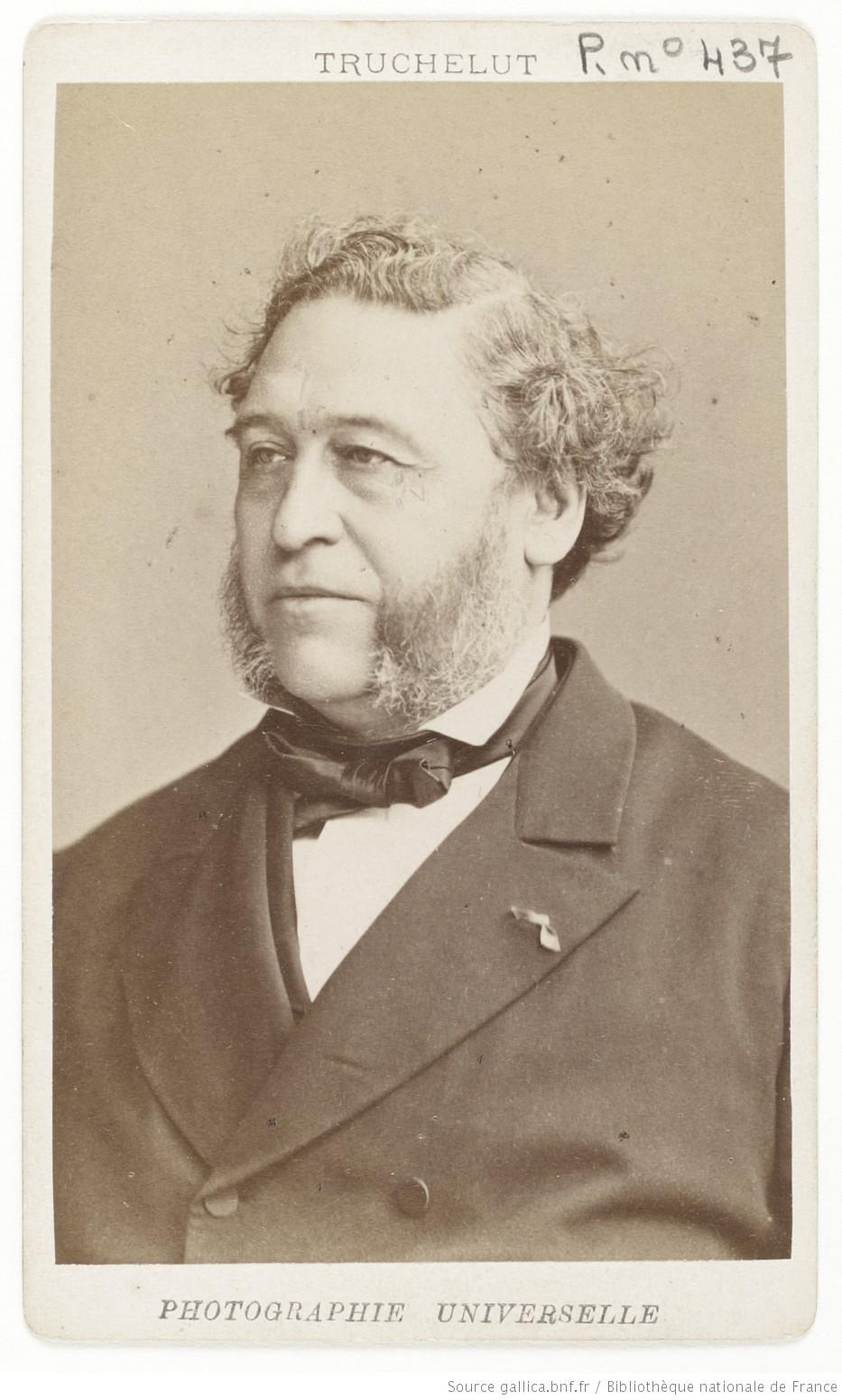

Paul Thénard (6 October 1819 – 8 August 1884), also known as Baron Arnaud Paul Edmond Thénard, was a French agronomist, wine producer, chemist, and politician. He discovered trimethylphosphine, the first organic phosphorus compound to be identified. He was known for his research into the control of phylloxera, an insect that was destroying much of the French wine industry, by infecting the roots of grape vines. He wrote a biography of his father, the noted chemist Louis Thénard.

== Career ==
He was born in Paris, France. He married in 1842. His new wife's family had a large vineyard holding in Givry. Thénard took charge of a vineyard in the same year of his marriage, and still known as Domaine Baron Thénard, in Talmay, in the department of Côte-d'Or. He administered carbon disulfide to combat phylloxera infestations at wine vineyards, by injecting the chemical into the vineyard soil, though this was only moderately successful.

He studied phosphorus compounds, using a laboratory set up in his wife's chateau in Talmay. He discovered trimethylphosphine, the first synthesised and isolated tertiary phosphine, in 1845 and reported in 1847. He was also the first chemist to isolate triethylphosphine. His work on phosphorus was referenced and developed further by other 19th-century chemists, notably August Hofmann and Auguste Cahours, who noted that these tertiary phosphines had a particularly strong odour.

His research into phosphine is not recorded as advancing past 1847, but he continued other investigations, and in 1868 he was jointly credited with the discovery of xylindein, an organic compound pigment, close to indigo in colour, drawn from tree fungi.

Separately, Paul Thénard set up a model farm in Talmay and worked with farmers to develop fertilisers that could improve productivity for both arable and livestock farmers. He was admitted to Académie des sciences in 1864.

Thénard served as mayor of Talmay from 1852 to 1866 and held other public offices, including the district and general council, representing Pontailler-sur-Saône in the department of Côte-d'Or. In 1870 he was interned by the invading Prussian army, and held captive for three months in Bremen. He left politics in 1871 and purchased a Montrachet Grand Cru vineyard in 1872. The Thénard family remains the second largest shareholder of that appellation and their Montrachet Grand Cru is marketed via the Domaine Baron Thénard brand.

His son, Arnould Thénard, contributed to the averting the potential destruction of Burgurdy's vineyards during the great French wine blight, by developing a grafting technique from rootstocks brought from the United States.

== Publications ==
His tertiary phosphine research was published in 1847. He wrote a number of agricultural studies, including one on raising cattle. The biography of his father was entitled Un grand Français, le chimiste Thénard, 1777–1857 (A great Frenchman: the chemist Thénard, 1777–1857).

== See also ==
- Phosphine
- Karlsruhe Congress
- Charles Thilorier
- Xylindein
