= Charles Thilorier =

Charles-Saint-Ange Thilorier was a student at the École polytechnique in the class / year of 1815, who was mistakenly believed to have been the first person to create solid carbon dioxide ("dry ice"). Actually, a French inventor, Adrien-Jean-Pierre Thilorier (1790–1844), discovered dry ice.

Unfortunately, in almost all of his technical articles, Adrien Thilorier gave his name simply as "Thilorier"; similarly, whenever others referred to him in technical articles, his name was also given only as "Thilorier". This impeded efforts by scholars to identify him subsequently. The confusion was compounded when Paul Thénard wrote a biography of his father, Louis Thénard, a French chemist: In 1835, Adrien Thilorier had created dry ice by spraying liquid carbon dioxide into a glass vessel. He had thought that the dry ice was merely snow; that is, water vapor from the atmosphere which had condensed as a result of the cold that the evaporation of the liquid carbon dioxide had produced. Louis Thénard had explained to Thilorier that his "snow" was actually solidified carbon dioxide. In a footnote of Louis Thénard's biography, Paul Thénard identified the "Thilorier" who discovered dry ice as "Charles-Saint-Ange Thilorier", a student at the École polytechnique in the class of 1815. This (mistaken) identification was mentioned by Duane H. D. Roller, a graduate student at Harvard University, in a paper that was published in 1952. Consequently, many sources claim that Charles-Saint-Ange Thilorier discovered dry ice.

Adrien-Jean-Pierre Thilorier was an employee of the French Post Office in Paris who invented, among other things, an oil lamp, a gas compressor, and an apparatus for producing liquid carbon dioxide. It was a French scholar who revealed that he had discovered dry ice.

During the 1960s, Madeleine Ambrière-Fargeaud, a scholar in France, was trying to identify the person who served as the model for a "mad scientist" character, Balthazar Claës, in Honoré de Balzac's novel La Recherche de l’absolu (The Quest of the Absolute). Her research suggested that Claës was inspired (in part) by Adrien-Jean-Pierre Thilorier. By 2003, Joost Mertens, a Dutch historian of science, had verified many of the findings that Ms. Ambrière-Fargeaud had made about Thilorier.

That "Thilorier" is actually Adrien-Jean-Pierre Thilorier is proved by French government documents, especially patents. In 1826, he was granted a patent for a "hydrostatic lamp"; the patent lists his name as "Thilorier (Adrien-Jean-Pierre)" of Paris. His 1831 patent for a gas compressor also lists his name as "Thilorier (Adrien-Jean-Pierre)" and describes him as an employee of the "Administration des postes" (i.e., the Post Office) in Paris. In 1832, the Bulletin of the laws of the kingdom of France also lists him as "Thilorier (Adrien-Jean-Pierre)" and as an employee of the Post Office, who resided at number 21 on the Place Vendôme in Paris, and as the inventor of a gas compressor.
