= Xylindein =

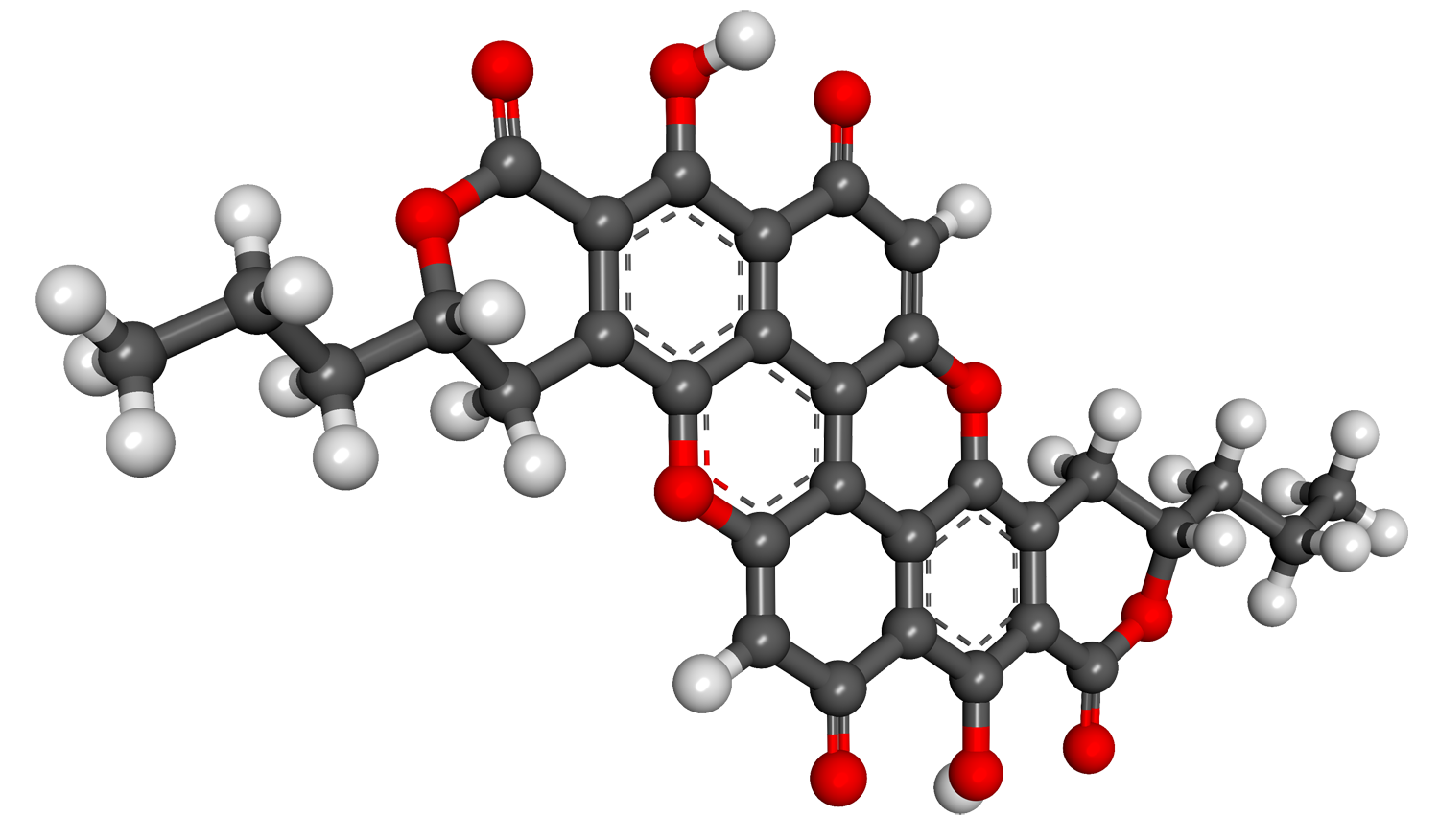

Names
- Preferred IUPAC name (3S,11S)-8,16-Dihydroxy-3,11-dipropyl-3,4,11,12-tetrahydro-1H,7H-pyrano[4,3-h]pyrano[4′,3′:5,6]xantheno[2,1,9,8-klmna]xanthene-1,7,9,15-tetrone
- Other names Xylindene (3S,11S)-3,4,11,12-Tetrahydro-8,16-dihydroxy-3,11-dipropyl-1H,7H-dipyrano[4,3-a:4',3'-j]-peri-xanthenoxanthene-1,7,9,15-tetrone peri-xanthenoxanthene-2,8-dicarboxy-lic acid 4,10-dihydro-3,9-dihydroxy-1,7-bis(2 S-hydroxy-pentyl)-4,10-dioxo-di δ-lactone

Identifiers
CAS Number	3779-11-1
3D model (JSmol)	Interactive image
ChemSpider	23078574
PubChem CID	101293600
UNII	M4UGH9LZS2
CompTox Dashboard (EPA)	DTXSID601045316
- InChI: InChI=1S/C32H24O10/c1-3-5-11-7-13-19(31(37)39-11)27(35)21-15(33)10-18-23-24-17(41-29(13)25(21)23)9-16(34)22-26(24)30(42-18)14-8-12(6-4-2)40-32(38)20(14)28(22)36/h9-12,35-36H,3-8H2,1-2H3/t11-,12-/m0/s1 Key: BZFKYROURDRMSO-RYUDHWBXSA-N
- SMILES: CCC[C@@H](C0)OC(=O)c(c1O)c0c2Oc3cC(=O)c4c5c3c6c2c1C(=O)cc6Oc5c7c(c4O)C(=O)O[C@H](C7)CCC

Properties
Chemical formula	C_{32}H_{24}O_{10}
Molar mass	568.534 g·mol^{−1}
- Except where otherwise noted, data are given for materials in their standard state (at 25 °C [77 °F], 100 kPa). Infobox references

Xylindein is a quinone pigment, a dimeric naphthoquinone derivative. It is produced by fungi in the genus Chlorociboria. This pigment causes green staining of wood infected by the fungi.

== Etymology ==
This pigment was first extracted in 1868 by Paul Thénard from wood. It resembled indigo, so he called it xylindéine, from the combination of xyl- (wood) and indé (indigo) + -ine.
