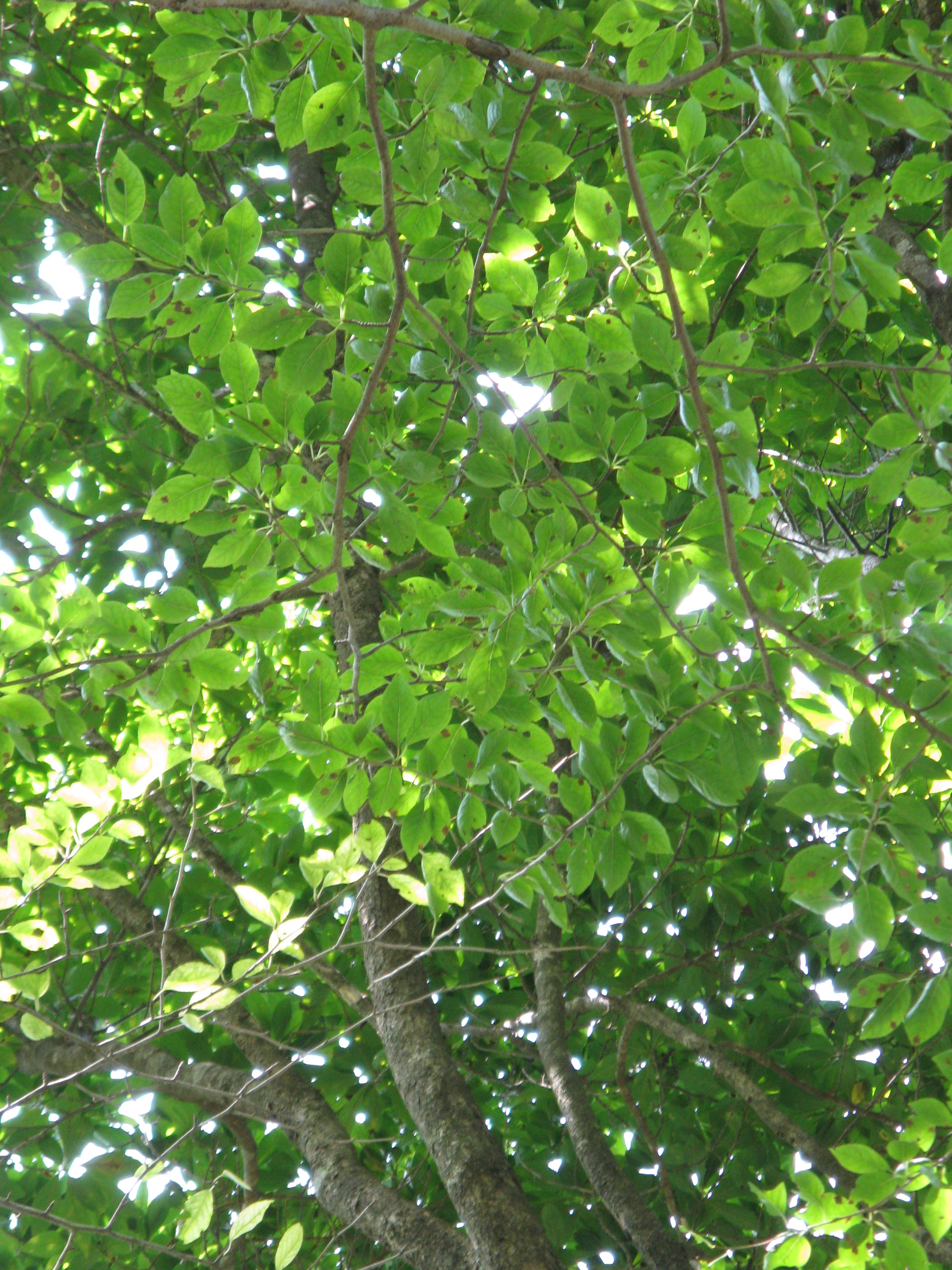
- Leaves
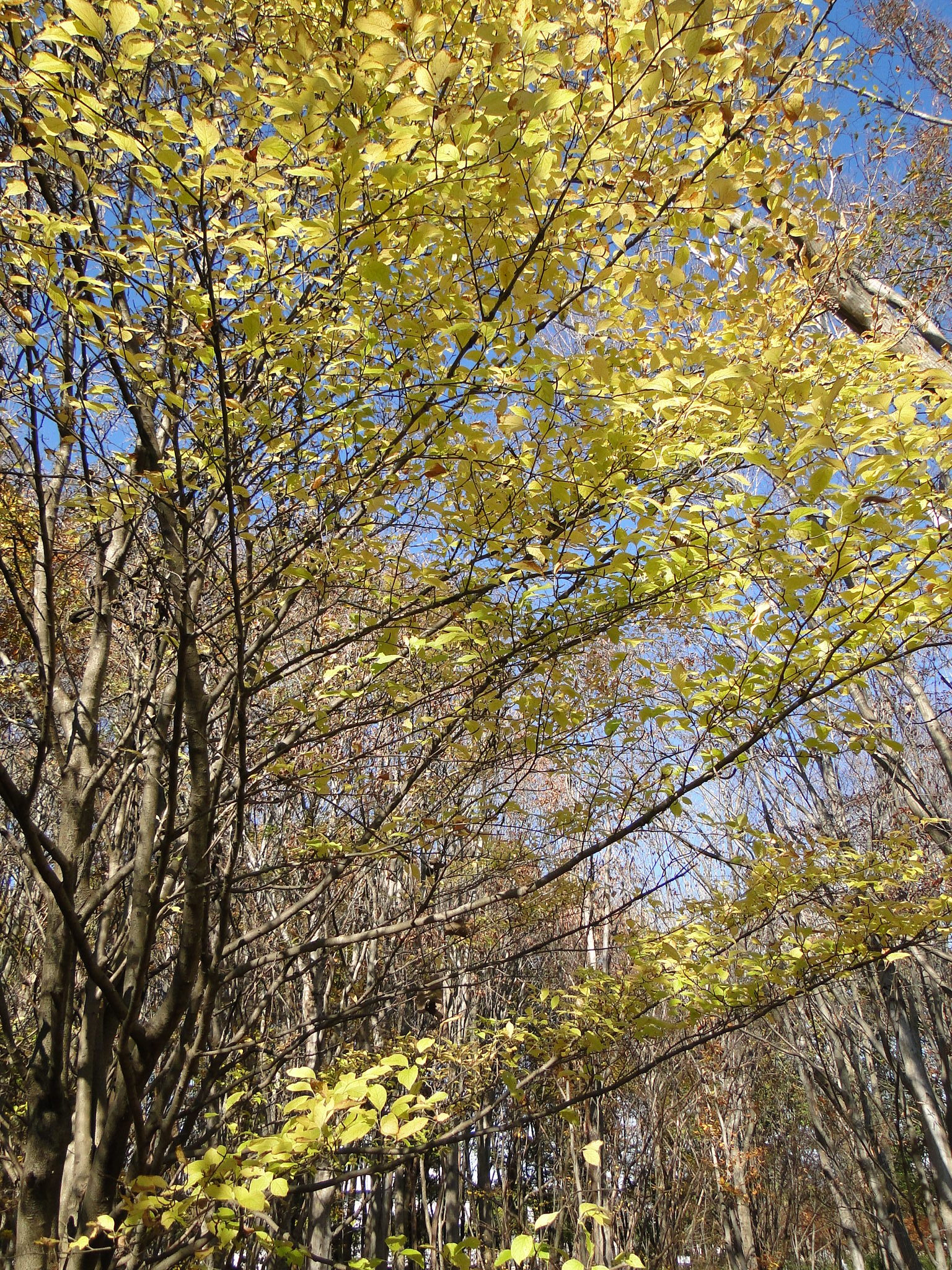
- Fall color

Conservation status
- Least Concern (IUCN 3.1)

Scientific classification
- Kingdom: Plantae
- Clade: Tracheophytes
- Clade: Angiosperms
- Clade: Eudicots
- Clade: Asterids
- Order: Aquifoliales
- Family: Aquifoliaceae
- Genus: Ilex
- Species: I. macropoda

Binomial name
- Ilex macropoda Miq.

Synonyms
- List: Ilex ambigua var. macropoda (Miq.) A.E.Murray; Ilex ambigua subsp. macropoda (Miq.) A.E.Murray; Ilex costata Blume ex Maxim.; Ilex dubia var. macropoda (Miq.) Loes.; Ilex dubia var. pseudomacropoda Loes.; Ilex macropoda var. pseudomacropoda (Loes.) Nakai; Ilex macropoda f. pseudomacropoda (Loes.) H.Hara; Ilex macropoda var. stenophylla Koidz.; Ilex montana var. macropoda (Miq.) Fernald; Ilex monticola var. macropoda (Miq.) Rehder

= Ilex macropoda =

Species of tree in the holly family

Ilex macropoda is a species of flowering plant in the holly family Aquifoliaceae, native to southern China, Korea, and Japan. A deciduous tree typically 13 m (43 ft) tall, it is found in mixed forests, forest edges, thickets, and roadsides, usually from 500 to 1,900 m (1,600 to 6,200 ft) above sea level. Local people make a tea by boiling its leaves.
