= Tunbridge ware =

Form of decoratively inlaid woodwork

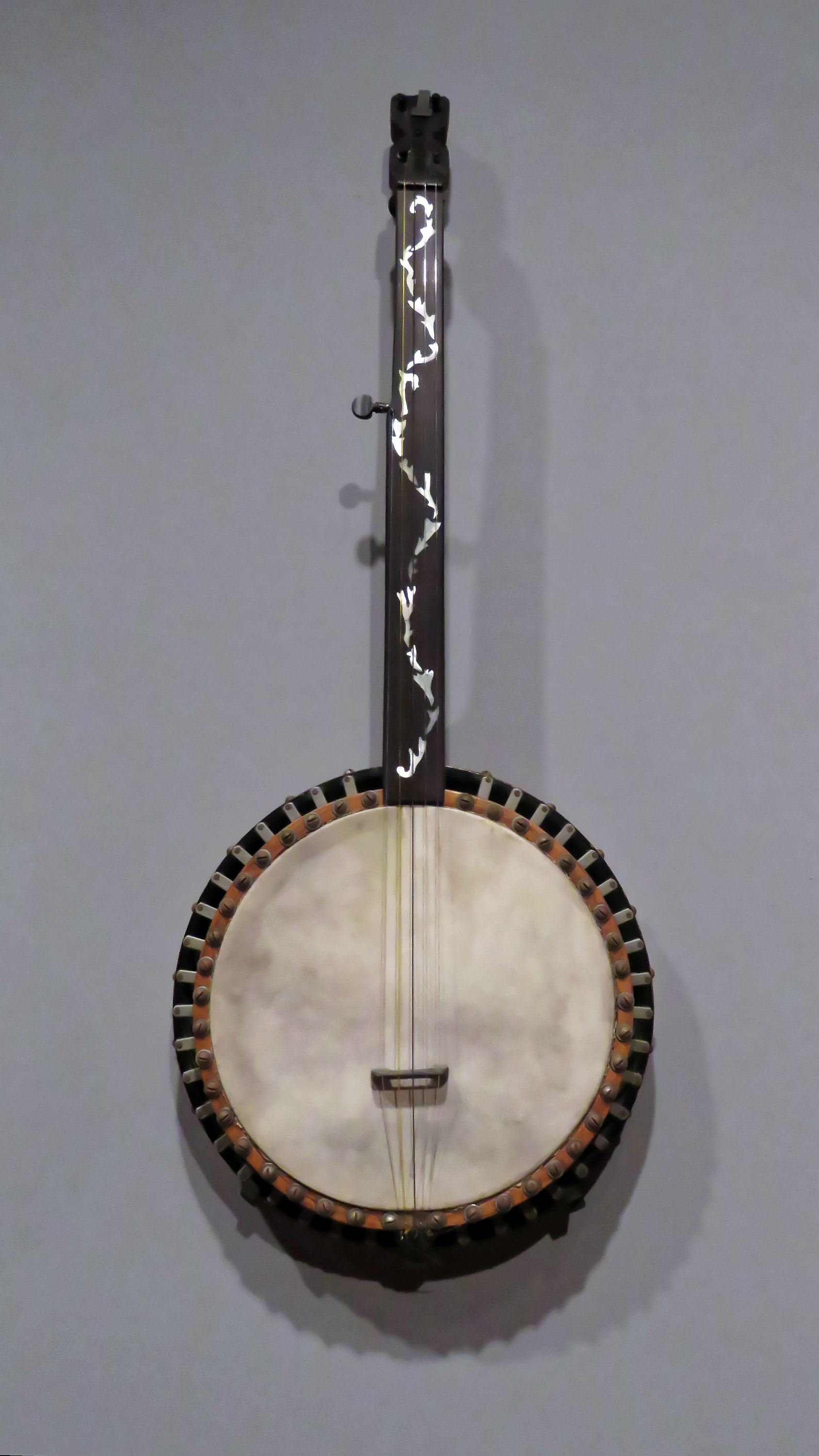
A Tunbridge ware banjo

Tunbridge ware is a form of decoratively inlaid woodwork, typically in the form of boxes, that is characteristic of Tonbridge and the spa town of Royal Tunbridge Wells in Kent in the 18th and 19th centuries. The decoration typically consists of a mosaic of many very small pieces of different coloured woods that form a pictorial vignette. Shaped rods and slivers of wood were first carefully glued together, then cut into many thin slices of identical pictorial veneer with a fine saw. Elaborately striped and feathered bandings for framing were pre-formed in a similar fashion.

There is a collection of Tunbridge ware in the Tunbridge Wells Museum and Art Gallery in Tunbridge Wells.

== History ==
The famous makers of Tunbridge ware were in the Tunbridge Wells area of Kent; their most notable work was from about 1830 to 1900.

Early makers of Tunbridge ware, in Tunbridge Wells in the mid 18th century, were the Burrows family, and Fenner and Co. In the 19th century, around 1830, James Burrows invented a technique of creating mosaics from wooden tesserae. Henry Hollamby, apprenticed to the Burrows family, set up on his own in 1842 and became an important manufacturer of Tunbridge ware, employing about 40 people.

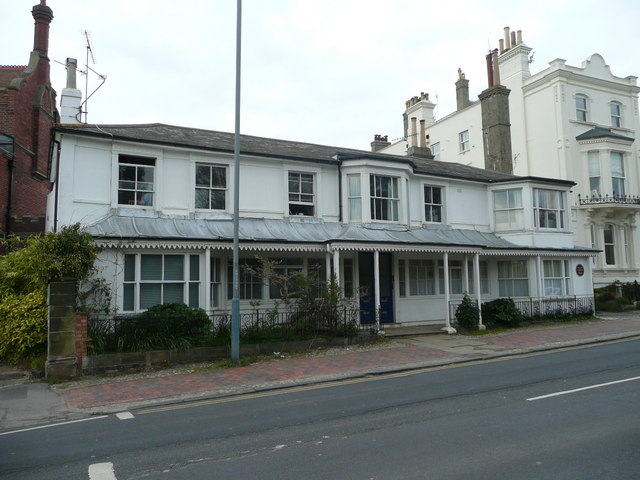
"The Chalet": home and workshop of Edmund Nye and Thomas Barton, Tunbridge Wells

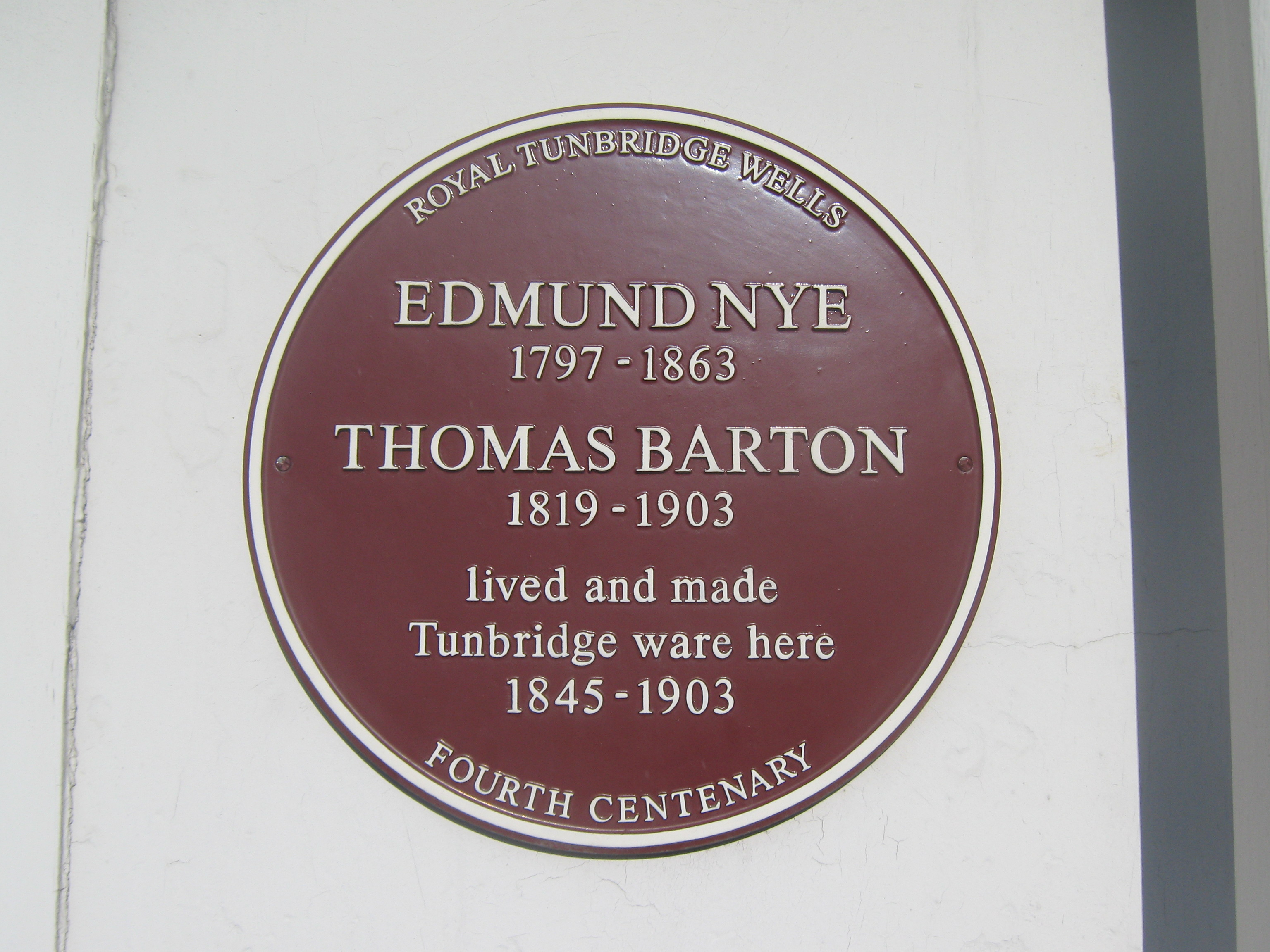
The plaque commemorating Edmund Nye and Thomas Barton

Edmund Nye (1797–1863) and his father took over the Fenner company when William Fenner retired in 1840, after 30 years in partnership with him. Thomas Barton (1819–1903), previously apprenticed at the Wise factory, joined the Nyes in 1836, and worked as Nye's designer; he took over the business in 1863 and continued there until his death.

In Tonbridge (near to Tunbridge Wells), George Wise (1703–1779) is known to have had a business in 1746. It continued with his son Thomas, and Thomas's nephew George (1779–1869), who took over in 1806. In its early years the company made articles such as workboxes and tea caddies with prints of popular views; later items had pictures created from mosaics. Their workshop in Tonbridge, Wise's Tunbridge Ware Manufactory, was next to the Big Bridge over the Medway; the building was demolished in 1886 to widen the approach to the bridge.

Tunbridge ware became popular with visitors to the spa town of Tunbridge Wells, who bought them as souvenirs and gifts. Articles included cribbage boards, paperweights, writing slopes, snuff boxes and glove boxes.

At the Great Exhibition of 1851, Tunbridge ware by Edmund Nye, Robert Russell and Henry Hollamby was shown; Edmund Nye received a commendation from the judges for his work. He exhibited a table depicting a mosaic of a ship at sea; 110,800 tesserae were used in making the picture.

The manufacturers of Tunbridge ware were cottage industries, and they were no more than nine in Tunbridge Wells and one in Tonbridge. The number declined in the 1880s; competent craftsmen were hard to find, and public tastes changed. After the death of Thomas Barton in 1903 the only surviving firm was Boyce, Brown and Kemp, which closed in 1927.

== Techniques ==
Marquetry was an old technique which was continued by Nye and Barton to create images such as birds or butterflies.

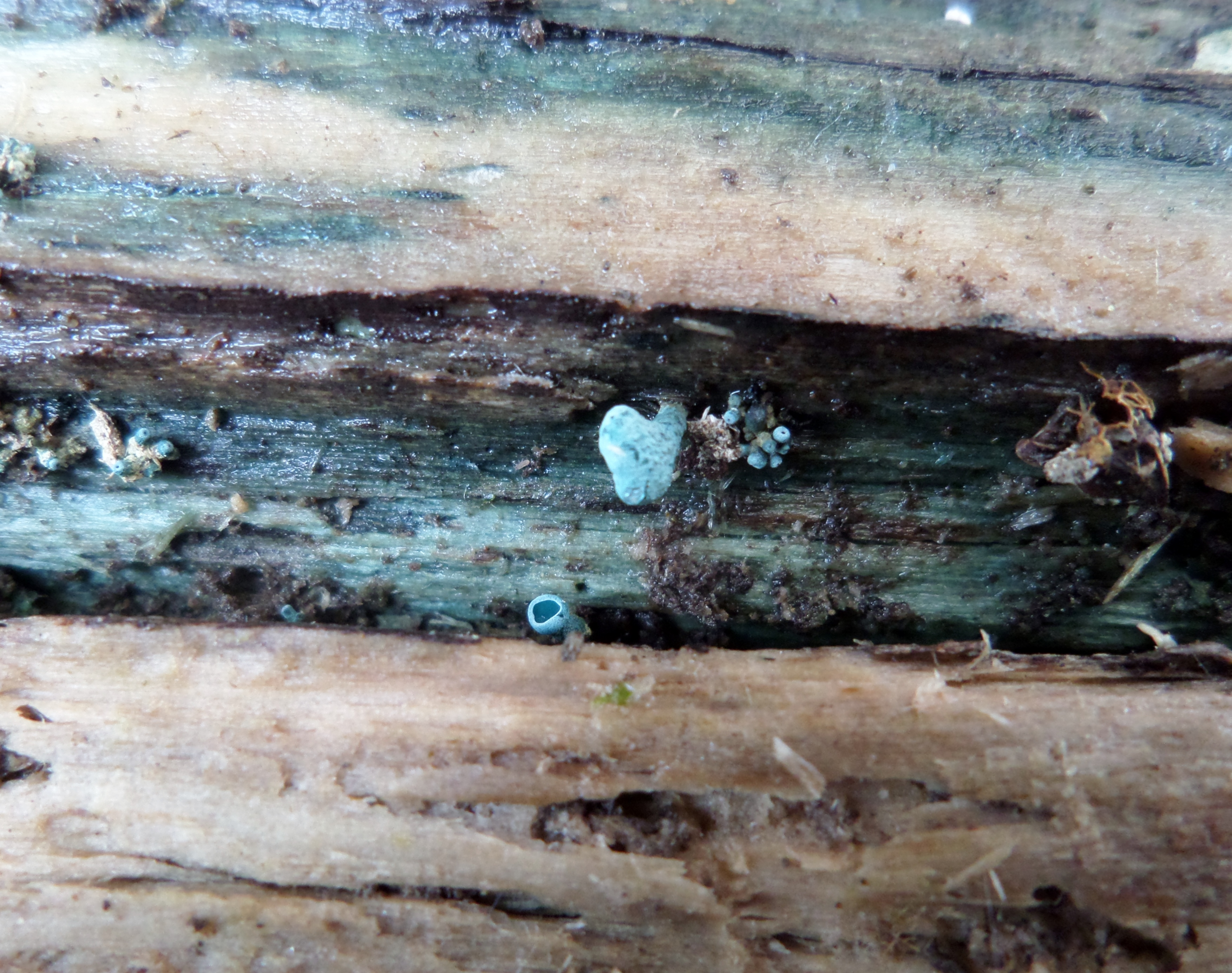
'Green Oak' as caused by the fungus Chlorociboria aeruginascens.

Stickware and half-square mosaic was invented by James Burrows in about 1830: a bunch of wooden sticks of different colours, each having triangular or diamond-shaped cross section, were tightly glued together; in the case of stickware, the resulting block was dried, then turned to form an article such as the base of a pincushion. For half-square mosaic, thin slices were taken from the composite block, and applied to a surface.

Tesselated mosaic, was a development by James Burrows of half-square mosaic; it was adopted by George Wise and Edmund Nye. Minute tesserae were used to form a wide variety of geometric and pictorial designs.

Many sorts of wood were used for the various colours; about 40 were in regular use. Only natural colours were used; green was provided by "green oak", produced by the action of fungus on fallen oak. Designs for articles were often taken from designs of Berlin wool work.

== See also ==
- Intarsia
- Lath art
- Marquetry
- Opus sectile
- Parquetry
- Pietre dure
- Yosegi
