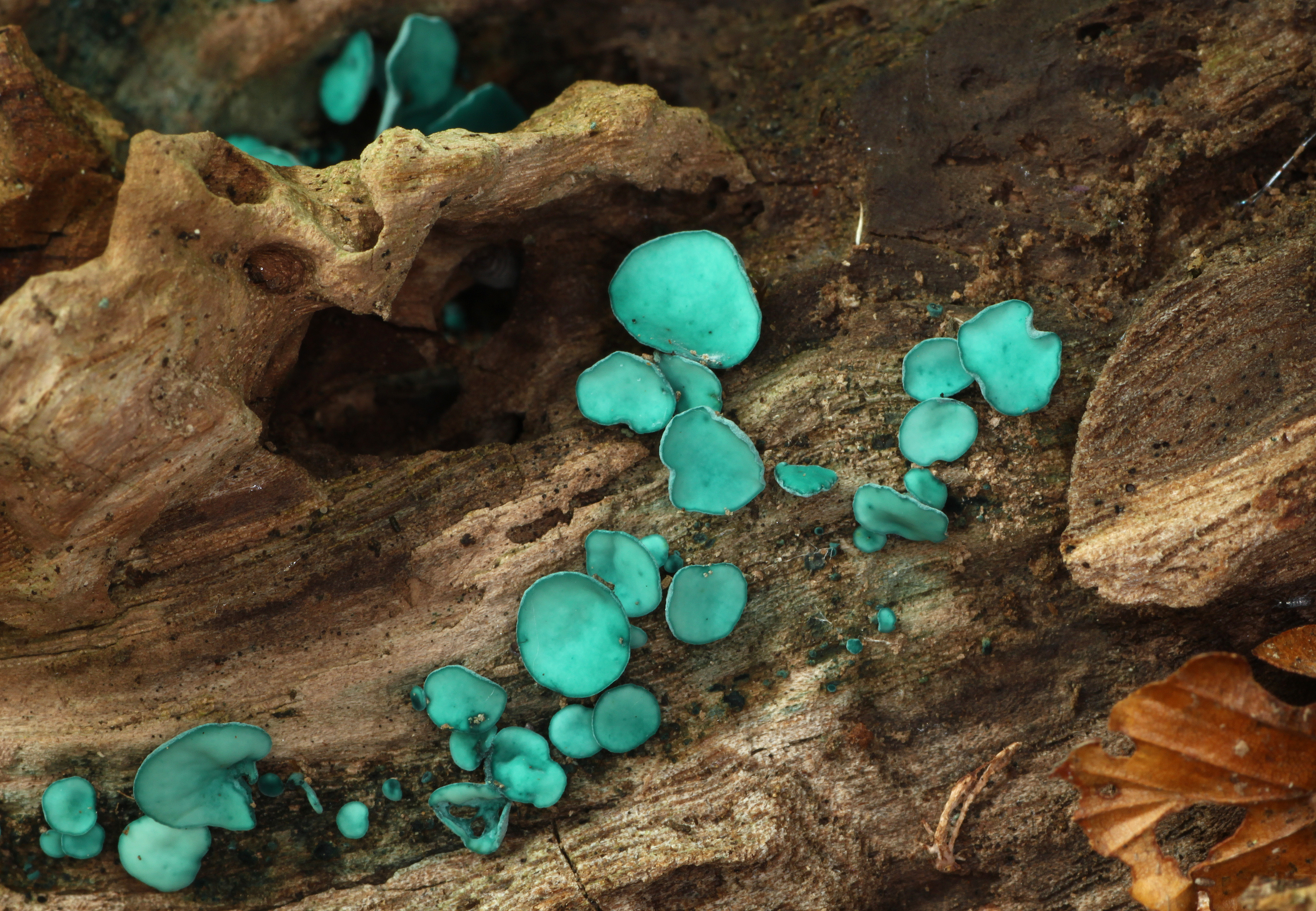
- Chlorociboria sp.

Scientific classification
- Kingdom: Fungi
- Division: Ascomycota
- Class: Leotiomycetes
- Order: Helotiales
- Family: Chlorociboriaceae; Baral & P.R.Johnst. (2015)

Type genus
- Chlorociboria Seaver ex Ramamurthi, Korf & L.R.Batra (1958)

Genera
- Chlorociboria; Brahmaculus

= Chlorociboriaceae =

Family of fungi

The Chlorociboriaceae are a family of "cup fungi" in the order Helotiales, with type genus Chlorociboria. A second genus Brahmaculus, which occurs only in the southern hemisphere (including Chile, New Zealand and Australia), was added in 2021.
