= Zion Robinson =

American football and basketball player

No. 2 – Stanford Cardinal
- Position: Wide receiver
- Class: Freshman

Personal information
- Listed height: 6 ft 2 in (1.88 m)
- Listed weight: 195 lb (88 kg)

Career information
- High school: Mansfield High School
- College: Stanford (2026–present)

Zion Robinson is an American football wide receiver for the Stanford Cardinal.

== Early life ==
Robinson attended Mansfield High School in Mansfield, Texas. In his sophomore season, he totaled 25 receptions for 409 yards and six touchdowns. In his junior season, Robinson hauled in 42 passes for 507 yards and eight touchdowns. As a senior, he notched 47 catches for 823 yards and 11 touchdowns. Coming out of high school, he was rated as a four-star recruit by 247Sports and committed to play college football for the Michigan Wolverines over offers from other schools such as Miami, Nebraska, and Stanford. However, after the firing of Michigan head coach Sherrone Moore, Robinson flipped his commitment and signed to play for the Stanford Cardinal.

== College career ==
Robinson entered his freshman season in 2026, competing for a starting spot.

== Personal life ==
Robinson is the son of former Olympic runner, Khadevis Robinson.
