= Mansfield Summit High School =

Location
- 1071 Turner Warnell Rd. Arlington, Texas 76001; 32.6139°N 97.1308°W

Information
- Former name: Mansfield High School - North Campus (1998-2002)
- Motto: A Tradition of Excellence
- Established: 2002
- Oversight: Mansfield ISD
- Principal: Jason Mutterer
- Teaching staff: 120.81 (FTE)
- Grades: 9–12
- Enrollment: 1,771 (2023-2024)
- Student to teacher ratio: 14.66
- Colors: Blue, black, white
- Mascot: Jaguars
- Rival: Mansfield High School
- Newspaper: The Jagwire

Mansfield Summit High School (Note: Formerly named Mansfield High School - North Campus from 1998-2002.) is a size 5A secondary school located in Arlington, Texas, and is part of the Mansfield Independent School District. The school serves a portion of Arlington.

The school first opened in the Fall of 2002. As of 2025, the school principal is Jason Mutterer. The school mascot is the Jaguar. Mansfield Summit High School has a student enrollment of 1950.

== School history ==
The Mansfield school district was a one high school district for many years. In 1998, the current Summit High School building was opened on Turner-Warnell Road in Arlington. It was originally the north campus center housing mainly juniors and seniors in the entire district. Mansfield High School was composed of two campuses – North and South Campus; in 2002, students who would be seniors in the 2002–2003 school year had the option to choose which school they would graduate from. The Mansfield High School name moved to a new building, while the old North Campus building became the site for Summit High School. The South Campus became Brooks Wester Middle School.

In 2004, Mansfield Timberview High School opened on Texas Highway 360 as Summit approached capacity. Again in 2007, another school opened, named Mansfield Legacy High School. Once again, students had the choice to pick which school they wished to attend. MISD now has five high schools: Mansfield High, Summit High, Timberview High, Legacy High, and Lake Ridge High, built and opened in 2012.

In 2025, Summit High won the state championship in 5A/D2 Boys Basketball.

== Alumni ==
- Myles Adams, 2016. Defensive End for the Seattle Seahawks.
- John Chiles, 2007. NFL wide receiver for the Chicago Bears.
- Moses Ehambe, 2004. Professional basketball player.
- Curtis Hollis, 2017. Basketball player
- Ahmaad Moses, 2022. Safety for the SMU Mustangs.
- Hal Presley, 2021. Football player.
- Jahmi'us Ramsey. Shooting Guard for the Oklahoma City Blue.
- Vernon Scott, 2016. Safety for the Green Bay Packers.
- Quinn Sharp, 2008. Placekicker for the Saskatchewan Roughriders.
- Joseph Williams, 2024. College football wide receiver for the Colorado Buffaloes

== Feeder patterns ==
The following elementary schools feed into Mansfield Summit High School:

- Anderson (partial)
- Davis
- Harmon
- Holt (partial)
- Morris
- Tipps

The following intermediate schools feed into Mansfield Summit High School:

- Cross Timbers
- Asa Low (partial)

The following middle schools feed into Mansfield Summit High School:

- Howard (partial)
- Wester (partial)
