= Effort to desegregate Texarkana Junior College =

1956 episode in school desegregation in North Texas

- Part of the civil rights movement
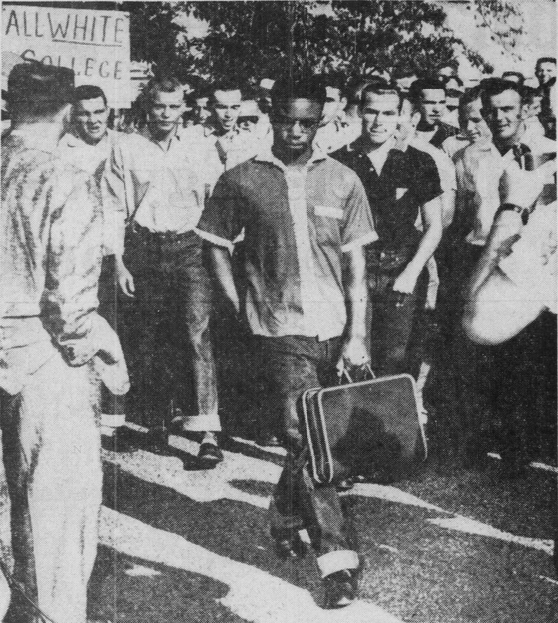
- Prospective black enrollee Steve Poston surrounded by anti-integration protestors
- Date: September 6–10, 1956
- Location: Texarkana, Texas, US
- Goals: Integration of Texarkana Junior College
- Methods: Lawsuits against the Texarkana Independent School District filed in federal court
- Result: Continued de facto segregation of Texarkana Junior College, until 1963

In September 1956, efforts were made to desegregate Texarkana Junior College in Texarkana, Texas, United States. The ultimately failed attempt was a part of the civil rights movement in Texas, and specifically the drive to desegregate schools.

After two lawsuits in the U.S. District Court for the Eastern District of Texas, the Texarkana Independent School District (TISD) was forbidden from refusing admission to students on the basis of their race. Despite the court order, the local white community and TISD officials successfully marshaled opposition to integration. When a pair of registered black students, Jessalyn Gray and Steve Poston, sought entry to the school, they were blocked by multiple hundred demonstrators.

Ulysses Simpson Tate, an NAACP lawyer who had represented plaintiffs in both lawsuits, unsuccessfully sought intervention from the federal government. After the crowd prevented the students from attending the college, Tate tried to sue TISD officials for contempt of court. As he had not worked with Gray and Poston personally as their representation, the case foundered. Amidst the desegregation effort, the state had filed a lawsuit—Texas v. NAACP—against the organization due to its activism in Texarkana and the Mansfield Crisis.

== Early attempts ==
In 1950, the United States Supreme Court ruled in Sweatt v. Painter that the Texas State Constitution's prohibition of integrated education was not applicable—due to the Equal Protection Clause of the Fourteenth Amendment—to admissions at the University of Texas Law School. After the judgment, the NAACP and other organizations in Texas heavily advocated for colleges and universities to end their own segregated admissions processes. Multiple junior colleges—including in Amarillo, Howard County, and San Angelo—voluntarily accepted black students by 1951.

In Texarkana, opposition to integration was demonstrative. A month after the Sweatt decision and two days after local discussions by the Texas Council of Negro Organizations on taking advantage of the ruling, the Ku Klux Klan held a public membership drive in the city, canvassing bystanders with pamphlets on white supremacy.

As early as 1948, local black residents tried to integrate Texarkana Junior College (TJC) and Texas High School, both of which were white-only and administered by the Texarkana Independent School District. Black students were segregated to Paul Laurence Dunbar High School. Two black Texarkanians—A. Maceo Smith and John J. Jones Sr.—were heavily involved in the civil rights movement. As president and secretary, respectively, of the state NAACP organization, they hoped that TJC would bring a major victory in the fight to integrate junior colleges.

== Lawsuits ==
=== Bruce v. Stilwell (1953) ===
In 1952, a group of five black students sued TJC in federal court for the Eastern District of Texas, with the representation of the NAACP's Ulysses Simpson Tate and William J. Durham. It was the second of three federal lawsuits in Texas that were filed between Sweatt and the more complete overruling of racial segregation in Brown v. Board of Education (1954), aimed at desegregating junior colleges. The name for the suit derives from Geraldine Bruce, one of the prospective students, and H.W. Stilwell, the firmly segregationist president of TJC.

Circuit Judge Joseph Warren Sheehy dismissed the lawsuit based on the TJC's argument that the students had not appealed first to the Texas State Board of Education, an administrative body that later said it did not have a role in TJC admissions. Months later, the Fifth Circuit Court of Appeals overturned the ruling. In the three-judge panel's unanimous ruling, Wayne G. Borah wrote that there was no established process for appeal to the state board, so the students maintained their right to seek remedy via the court system.

=== Whitmore v. Stilwell (1956) ===
While the case was between appeal and judgement, a second group of students attempted to enroll at TJC in May 1953. Guided by John Jones, the nine students first went to register with the school's dean and registrar. After those officials directed them to meet with the president of the TISD, they were informed that the board would discuss it in a future meeting. At that meeting, the board authorized a committee for the students and board-members to negotiate. The board-members then offered numerous alternatives to integration, including split days—where white students would attend TJC in the morning and black students would attend in the afternoon—and a new blacks-only junior college as an alternative to TJC.

The students maintained their interest only in integration. When the black junior college opened in the fall of 1954, no students enrolled. The TISD then reincorporated the faculty and facility into the Dunbar high school complex. Tate praised Jones's leadership in ensuring unity, writing that he "simply refused to let Jim Crow sprout new roots."

The case was first heard in November 1954 in the Eastern District of Texas, again by Sheehy, with Tate representing the students and Thomas Bain representing the school district. Sheehy found for the district, arguing that the school may have concluded that the students were not qualified for admission at the junior college aside from their race. Sheehy also surmised that, given the Brown decision, the school likely had changed their policy to allow integration, though that was not the case. On appeal at the Fifth Circuit in November 1955, a three-judge panel unanimously overturned the ruling, with Joseph Chappell Hutcheson Jr. writing that the district had clearly centered race in their assessment of the applicants and were "forever restrained from refusing admission to any of the plaintiffs shown to be qualified in all respects for admission."

== White community rejects court order ==
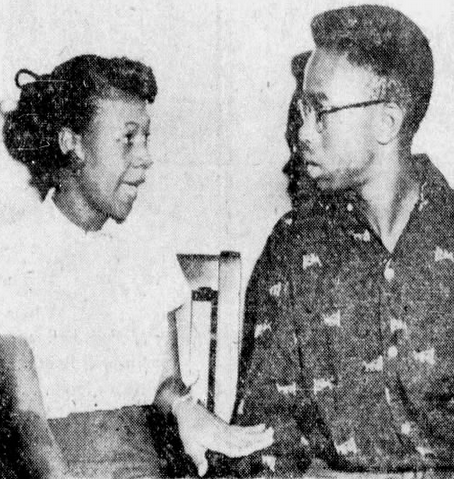
Jessalyn Gray (left) and Steve Poston (right) pictured September 27, 1957

The following year, the NAACP supported a group of Dunbar graduates applying to TJC in light of the court order prohibiting racial discrimination at TJC. A group of black students, including Jessalyn Gray and Steve Poston, enrolled at the school on September 6, successfully taking the entrance exam and paying for entry. On the same day, TISD president Stilwell and other board-members encouraged the local white community to reject the ruling, with Stilwell proclaiming at a White Citizen's Council meeting that "it is not only your right, but your duty to resist" integration.

Throughout the two weeks of September 1956, threats and violence against black residents recurred throughout Bowie County. A cross and an effigy of a black person were burned on the TJC campus. Someone fired a shotgun into a gas station belonging to a local community member involved with the NAACP.

On September 10, the first day of classes, a mob of hundreds of white anti-integration protestors gathered in front of TJC. Two black students—Gray and Poston—arrived to attend. Four Texas Rangers were on the scene, led by Captain Jay Banks, but when Gray asked Banks whether they would help them enter the blocked school, he refused. Poston tried to move through the crowd to enter, but they pushed him back and kicked him. After that attempt failed and the crowd threatened to grow more violent, a group of black bystanders sent in a taxi to retrieve the two teenagers, with the entire altercation lasting about 15 minutes.

=== Federal response ===
Tate wrote a telegram to the White House on September 10, requesting the assistance in ensuring the court order was followed. L. Clifford Davis, the attorney during the Mansfield Crisis, had done the same the previous week, but the help had not been forthcoming. Citing the tacit support Governor Allan Shivers and the Rangers expressed for the violence of the anti-integrationist demonstrators, Tate argued that federal inaction would encourage their behavior in the future:

Unless [...] help is provided by your office, a state of anarchy will exist as to these Negro students and they will be at the mercy of a maddened mob and without protection of either their persons or their civil rights at the county, the state and the federal levels.

President Dwight Eisenhower wrote in response a week later that he disapproved of the violence and expressed hope that the country "will not allow anger and bitterness on either side of this critical problem to defeat its solution." He also said that he requested Attorney General Herbert Brownell to investigate. Despite the sentiment, the federal government declined to intervene.

== Contempt lawsuit ==
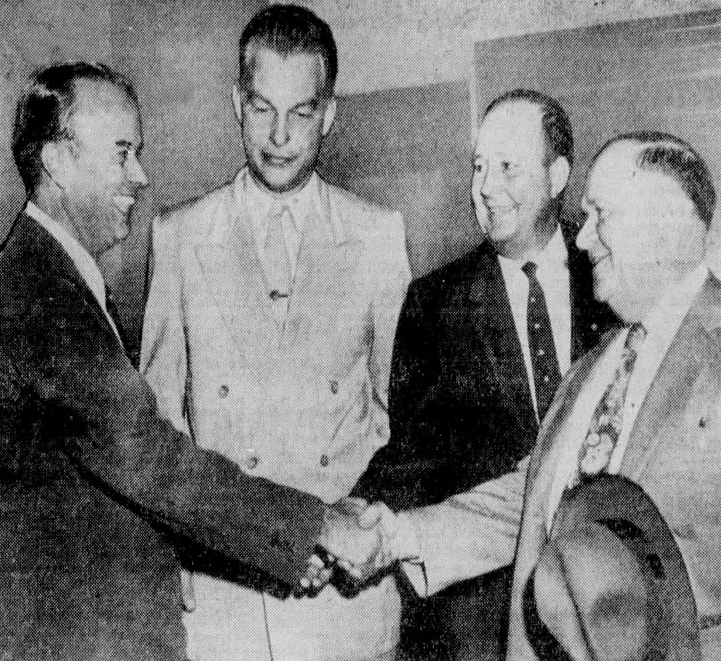
Texas Attorney General John Ben Shepperd (left) congratulates H.W. Stilwell (right) and other TISD officials after success in contempt lawsuit.

After the crowd successfully prevented the desegregation of the college by Gray and Poston, Tate filed a contempt of court lawsuit against the school. Though he worked with John Jones Jr. on the lawsuit, Tate had not met with either Gray or Poston before filing the lawsuit on their behalf. On the day before the hearing on September 25, the office of the Texas Attorney General interviewed the two students and their parents. In what they would describe as an intimidating setting featuring armed guards, the group professed no knowledge of the lawsuit. Gray's father said that he thought Tate had been a district attorney. Poston's mother said she hadn't known much about the fight to desegregate the school, believing he should go to TJC only so "he could go there and be at home. It would be much cheaper and lighter on him."

The hearing was held in Tyler, Texas, under Judge Joe Sheehy, who had originally heard and dismissed both lawsuits against TJC. The case focused on whether the lawsuit was permitted to proceed if Tate was not properly representing Gray and Poston. In their respective testimony, Gray and Poston said that while they had voluntarily sought admission and knew the NAACP was involved, they never approved a lawsuit or spoke with Tate. After Sheehy accepted Tate's subsequent motion to dismiss the suit, he lambasted the lawyer for his mistake.

== Aftermath ==
No black students attended Texarkana Junior College until 1963. In a retrospective interview in 1986, Gray expressed some ambivalence about the incident overall, having felt embarrassed at the time to see a large picture of herself and Poston printed in Life. She had sought entry to Texarkana Junior College after her father's worsening health disrupted her original plan of attending the Tuskegee Institute, planning to take courses at TJC before transferring to a four-year college. Gray instead attended North Texas State University that year, which had recently integrated.

The failed desegregation attempt coincided with a broader effort by the state of Texas—and especially the office of Texas Attorney General John Ben Shepperd—to sanction the NAACP. The trial, Texas v. NAACP, began on September 28 in Tyler, Texas, following the aborted contempt lawsuit against the TISD officials. It hinged largely on the organization's role in the Texarkana incident and the Mansfield Crisis, with Texas arguing that Tate, L. Clifford Davis, and other NAACP representatives had goaded the students into trying to desegregate their respective schools. NAACP Legal Defense Fund head Thurgood Marshall referred to the state's lawsuit as the "greatest crisis" the organization had faced to that point.
