= R.C. Hickman =

American photographer

- An example of R.C. Hickman's work, depicting segregation in Dallas
- Born: Rufus Cornelius Hickman c. 1922; Mineola, Texas
- Died: December 1, 2007
- Occupations: Photographer, Photojournalist, Circulation Manager
- Known for: Civil Rights Movement photography
- Notable work: Behold the People: R.C. Hickman's Photographs of Black Dallas, 1949–1961
- Spouse: Ruth Kay

R.C. Hickman (born Rufus Cornelius Hickman; c. 1922 – December 1, 2007) was an American photographer, photojournalist and circulation manager, known for his photographs of the Civil Rights Movement. Hickman's work includes documenting the Mansfield school desegregation incident, as well as the visitation of people such as Martin Luther King Jr. and Ella Fitzgerald in Dallas, Texas. For many decades he worked as a photographer for the Dallas Star Post (an African-American-owned newspaper) as well as freelancing for Jet, Ebony and an array of other African-American magazine publications.

Hickman was further involved with The National Association for the Advancement of Colored People (NAACP), documenting inequality in Dallas, Texas, such as photographing the Dallas school segregation for the NAACP's court cases.

The publication of Hickman's book, Behold the People (1994), highlights the many photographs taken by Hickman during the time of the Civil Rights movements. Hickman's work tends to convey the everyday life of African-American citizens during the Civil Rights Movement era, specifically documenting subjects such as schools, universities, clubs and restaurants.

== Early life and education ==
A map of Texas, USA, depicting Mineola

Rufus Cornelius Hickman was born in 1922 in Mineola, Texas. Towards the end of the 1920s, during the Great Depression, his family, consisting of his father and brother, relocated to Dallas in order for his father, a railroad Pullman, to find work as a cook at the Baker Hotel.

Throughout his early life, Hickman spent much of his time selling newspapers and magazines, such as The Courier Magazine and Woman's Home Companion.

Hickman began attending Tillotson College (known as Huston-Tillotson University) in Austin, which was a senior college established for African American students in 1881. Hickman later married his wife, Ruth Kay.

=== World War II ===
Hickman was drafted to the U.S Army on the outset of World War II. His actions in the War proved important in his development of an interest in photography, guided by his role as an Army photographer, which allowed him to learn the functions of cameras and develop his personal style. Many skills he learned during this time were taught to him by other soldiers around him, particularly during his time spent in Japan.

=== Post-War education ===
Following the end of World War II, Hickman returned to Texas and studied at the Southwest School of Photography and Mortuary Science, expanding his theoretical understanding of the art whilst beginning to enter the photography industry, working in a darkroom at Hall Gentry Studio.

== Photography career ==
=== Circulation manager ===
Hickman spent time in numerous roles across the photojournalism industry, including overseeing distribution of newspapers in his role as a circulation manager, for the Dallas Star Post. This role involved touring many national newspaper companies across the United States, such as the Los Angeles Sentinel. He spent 12 years in this role at the Dallas Star Post, which allowed him to gain an important understanding of the journalism industry, and further his photography skills, also providing photographic services to the newspaper to use for coverage in articles.

=== Newspapers ===
Along with his time spent at the Dallas Star Post, Hickman provided freelance photography for many other local Dallas newspapers, including the Dallas Times Herald and the Dallas Express, as well as providing his services more broadly to the Kansas City Call. Hickman also spent time working in sales of newspapers and advertising, utilising the skills he acquired selling papers at a young age.

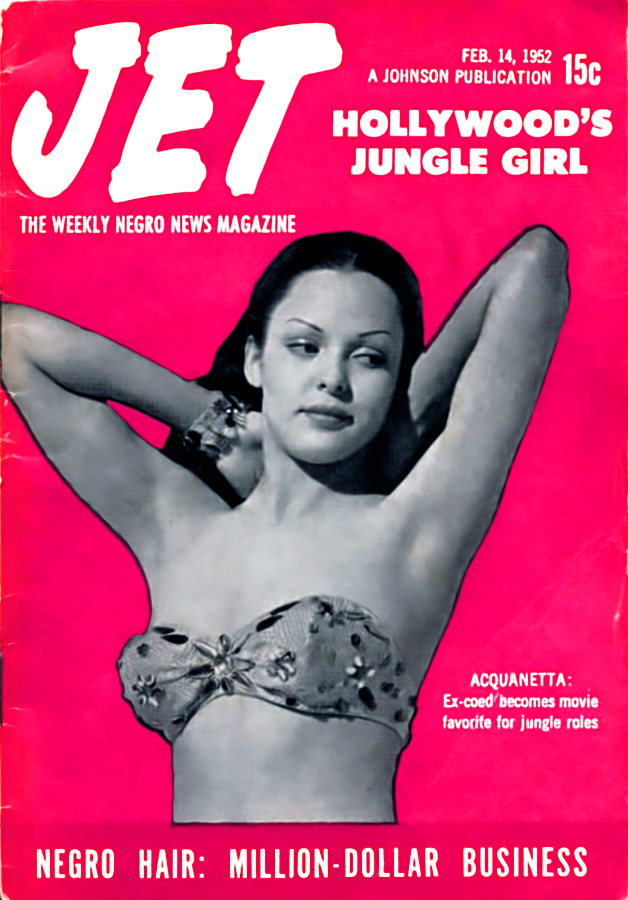
An example of Jet Magazine front cover, for the February 14, 1952 issue.

=== African-American magazines ===
Many of Hickman's photographs were used in an array of African-American Magazine publications, used as either lifestyle photographs or for Civil Rights articles. There were very few African American photographers that worked professionally during the Civil Rights movement in Dallas, however, magazines such as Jet, and its closely related Ebony Magazine, which Hickman worked for, had a large proportion of African American photojournalists, giving Hickman the rare opportunity to advance his career.

=== The National Association for the Advancement of Colored People ===
Hickman spent much of his photographic career working for The National Association for the Advancement of Colored People (NAACP), which was at the forefront of the American Civil Rights movement during the 1930s and 1940s. Hickman's work at the organisation was to be used for evidence in numerous cases and events for racial justice, specifically regarding the everyday treatment of African-American individuals.

== Contribution to Dallas' Civil Rights Movement ==
=== Photography of notable individuals ===
R.C Hickman photographed numerous notable individuals during their visitations to Dallas, Texas. This included the visitation of Martin Luther King Jr, in 1956. This particular visit was at the Good Street Baptist Church on 22 April 1956. Moreover, Hickman was the main photographer present during an NAACP meeting on 22 September 1956, in which Thurgood Marshall and W. J. Durham, both African American justice lawyers, were speaking.

A link can be made between much of Hickman's work in Dallas and a Texas colleague, Calvin Littlejohn, who photographed many similar events in the city of Fort Worth. Littlejohn and Hickman documented very similar events in their respective cities, as many of the notable individuals would tour both cities.

Hickman also documented individuals such as Eleanor Roosevelt, Joe Louis and Ella Fitzgerald on numerous occasions.

=== Dallas School Segregation court case ===
During his time with the NAACP, Hickman was involved in the documentation of the Dallas School Segregation Court Case in 1954, named the Brown vs Board of Education case. The case that Hickman was involved in, and on many occasions called to testify on in court, brought to light the inequalities of school segregation and inequalities in Dallas. Specifically, the process in which Hickman would capture the disparities between local segregated schools can be seen in the comparison between Booker T. Washington High School, a school for African-American students, and Woodrow Wilson High School, a school for white Americans. This particular example demonstrated the differences in teaching facilities of science and biology departments.

=== Mansfield school desegregation incident ===
On August 31, whilst documenting evidence of segregation inequalities for the NAACP, Hickman became involved in an incident in Mansfield, Texas, regarding the desegregation of the Mansfield High School in 1956, in which between 300 and 400 individuals were protesting desegregation. Hickman was assigned to photograph a mock lynching at the school in which Hickman documented the poor state of the segregated schools, when he was pursued by individuals involved in the lynching and had to flee the scene. The pursuit continued from Mansfield until Hickman reached Fort Worth. Pursuits and acts of violence such as this became commonplace for photographers and photojournalists during the Civil Rights Movement, with Hickman, along with others such as Charles Moore and Flip Schulke, experiencing backlash whilst attempting to document events.

Cover of Hickman's book Behold the people: R.C. Hickman's photographs of Black Dallas, 1949–1961

== Behold the People by Hickman ==
Behold the People: R.C. Hickman's Photographs of Black Dallas 1949–1961, was published by The Briscoe Centre for American History, the University of Texas, in 1994. The book compiles images from Hickman's time documenting Dallas' Civil Rights Movement, donated to the university in 1985. The photographs range from the 1950s to the 1960s, the time in which Hickman was most active in Civil Rights Movement.

=== Style of photography ===
Hickman used a Speed Graphic camera to take many of his photographs, and the archives of his work are generally 4×5 film negatives.

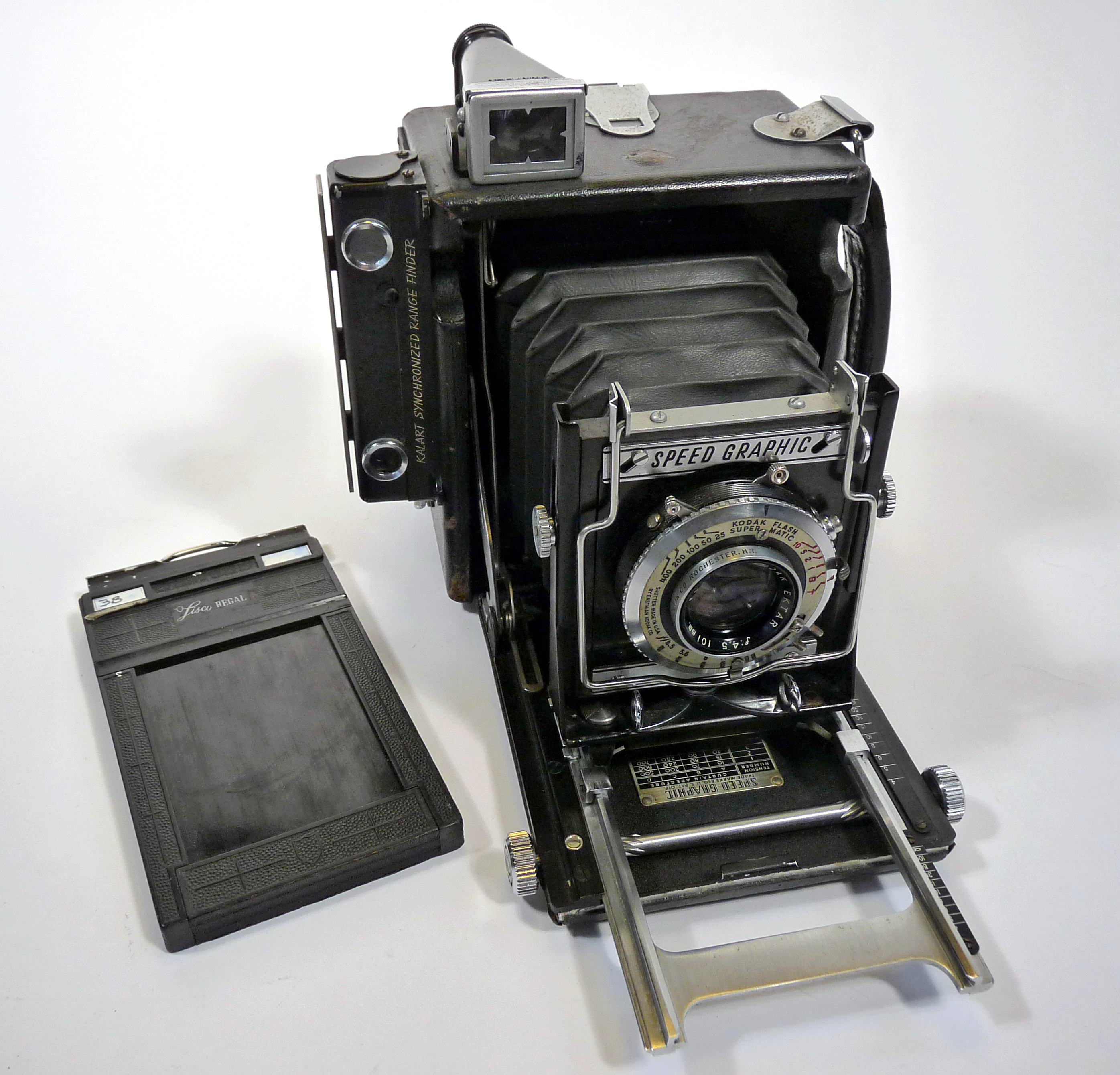
A Speed Graphic Camera, similar to that used by R.C. Hickman

Hickman's photography tends to take a form of displaying the everyday lives of African American individuals in an environment of injustice, whether this is at night clubs, schools, universities or at restaurants. This form of photography conveys transparency in the life of these individuals, demonstrating a “naked truth” that illustrates the everyday struggles of African Americans in this era. Much of Hickman's work also demonstrates contrast and juxtaposition through its portrayal of the life of normal citizens in African American communities, when compared to the conditions experienced by white communities. This style of juxtaposition is seen in Hickman's documentation of school facilities when he was working on the Dallas School Segregation case.

This particular style of photography that Hickman tended towards is unique to the photographic trends of this era. Many photographers during this time illustrated protests and acts of violence in the effort for racial equality, however, Hickman's portrayal of everyday life is a less prevalent theme. The style of photography adopted by Hickman has since become important in recounting the breadth of the Civil Rights Movement. By demonstrating the day-to-day struggles of African American communities, photography historians have argued that they provide "a more inclusive and nuanced appreciation of the diversity of [Civil Rights Movement] participants and their activities."

=== Response to the book ===
Behold the People has received numerous responses from individuals regarding its portrayal of the Dallas Civil Rights Movement. Barbara Jordan, an American lawyer and congresswoman, stated that "these are images of the ordinary lives of extraordinary people who succeeded in spite of all the obstacles in their path, and who eventually demanded and, in important ways, won their rights."

== Retirement ==
Hickman retired from his photography career in the 1970s and began his endeavor into retail management. This change in career involved Hickman managing a company called Decorative Interiors Incorporated. Alongside this, Hickman shared his experiences and advice on photography through an array of workshops and lectures across schools in Dallas.

== Awards and recognition ==
Hickman received numerous recognitions for his work during the Civil Rights Movement, focusing on the role his photography played in Dallas. For example, a Dallas organisation known as the Artist and Elaine Thornton Foundation introduced the R.C. Hickman Young Photographers Workshop, to teach young students photography basics.

Annette Strauss and Steve Bartlett, two former mayors of Dallas, have also given Hickman praise for his work in photography and photojournalism, along with the Dallas/Fort Worth Association of Black Journalists.

Upon Hickman's death in 2007, a tribute was made by Eddie Bernice Johnson, a representative of Texas, to the House of Representatives. The tribute comments on Hickman's “irreplaceable contributions he made to the community of Dallas and the state of Texas.”

== Exhibitions and archives ==
Since his retirement, much of Hickman's work has become available through an array of archives, such as the Briscoe Center for American History, which has been set up by the University of Texas. This particular archive mirrors much of Hickman's work depicted in his published book, Behold the People, but includes series of photographs succeeding the book's publication in 1994, documenting photographs from 1945 to 2005. Hickman's work archived at The Briscoe Center for American History has been categorized into subjects with the largest number of photographs taken, including schools, funerals, clubs, colleges and news, signifying Hickman's general style and subjects during the Civil Rights Movement era. The Briscoe Center's archive of Hickman's work has also been coupled with online exhibitions of Hickman and Calvin Littlejohn's photography.

Hickman's work has also been on exhibition at the Dallas Historical Society, a non-for-profit organization that aims to convey and uphold artefacts of Dallas' history. Beginning on 19 June 2015, photographs from Behold the People were put on display for the public of Dallas to observe.

The Struggle for Justice: Four Decades of Civil Rights Photography, is another exhibition that was introduced in 2017 to demonstrate both the hardships and successes of the Civil Rights Movement era. This exhibition features Hickman, along with other Civil Rights photographers such as Charles Moore and Flip Schulke, focusing on issues such as “signs of segregation”, “organizations and leaders” of the movement, and “the risks and threat of violence that civil rights activists faced”.

Hickman's work was also displayed during Black History Month in 2019 at the Dallas City Hall and the Briscoe Center.

Hickman's work was included in the 2025 exhibition Photography and the Black Arts Movement, 1955–1985 at the National Gallery of Art.

== Death ==
Hickman died on December 1, 2007, in his home in Oak Cliff, Dallas. He was aged 85.

== Publications ==
- Behold the People: R.C. Hickman's Photographs of Black Dallas, 1949–1961. Barker Texas History Center Series. Texas State Historical Association, 1995. (ISBN 0-87611-136-3)

== See also ==
- List of photographers of the civil rights movement
