= Mansfield Crisis =

Failed effort to desegregate school district in Texas

- Part of the civil rights movement
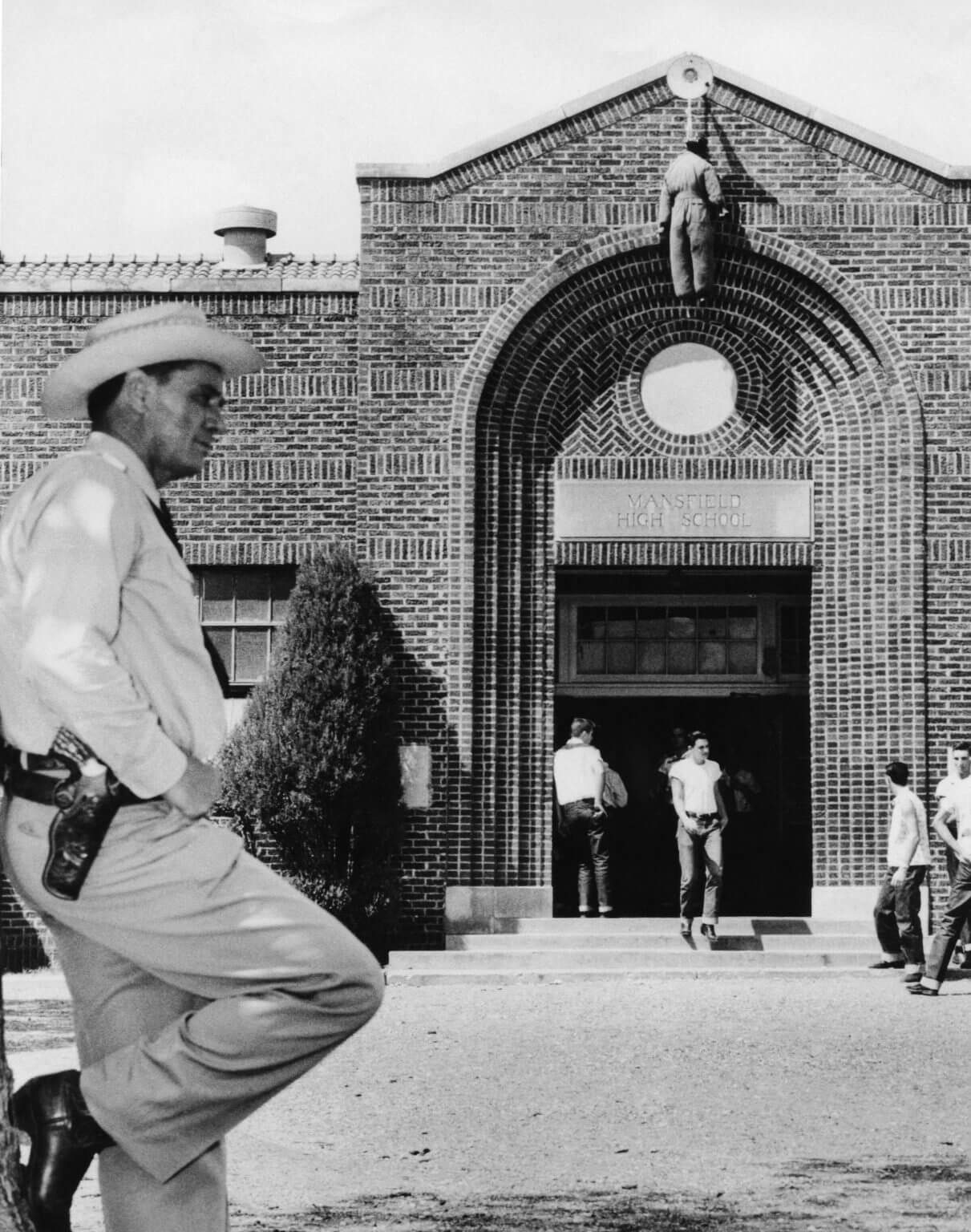
- Texas Ranger Jay Banks during the Mansfield Crisis in September 1956, with black effigy over schoolhouse door
- Date: August 30, 1956 – September 4, 1956
- Location: Mansfield, Texas, US
- Caused by: federal court order in Jackson v. Rawdon to allow enrollment of black students at previously segregated white school; defiance of order by school board and Texas Governor Allan Shivers
- Methods: blocking entry to Mansfield High School during registration period; refusing to accept black registrants via alternate entry; mob threats of violence and economic retribution against broader black community
- Result: continued de facto segregation in the Mansfield Independent School District (MISD) until 1965

Parties
NAACP; Eastern District of Texas federal court; Black Mansfield residents	Texas; Texas Rangers Division; Mansfield Independent School District; White Mansfield residents

Lead figures
L. Clifford Davis; Ulysses Simpson Tate; Floyd Moody; Charles Moody; Nathaniel Jackson	Texas Governor Allan Shivers; MISD Superintendent R.L. Huffman; MISD Boardmember O.C. Rawdon

The Mansfield Crisis was a 1956 event in Mansfield, Texas, United States. It was part of the broader civil rights movement and especially the effort to desegregate schools in the Dallas-Fort Worth metroplex.

After the Supreme Court unanimously ruled in Brown v. Board of Education that segregation in public schools was unconstitutional, some black residents in Mansfield petitioned the school board to integrate the system. After the board denied repeated requests—both for desegregation and for improvement to the black school facility—three black students represented by L. Clifford Davis sued the board in the Northern District of Texas. The eventual judgement in Jackson v. Rawdon held that the board was "forever restrained from refusing admission to [...] any of the plaintiffs shown to be qualified in all respects for admission."

Despite the ruling, the white community in Mansfield responded with severe opposition to integration. Some anonymously burned crosses in the black neighborhood and separately hung black effigies in prominent areas of town. A large mob of dozens of white residents gathered on August 30, August 31, and September 4—the only days when black students would be able to register—blocking the doors and expressing their race-based opposition to desegregation. The demonstrations repeatedly featured violence or threats of violence. Due to the threats of violence and lack of government support, the black students did not attend Mansfield High School.

Texas Governor Allan Shivers supported the local officials in their aims to prevent desegregation. Shivers also worked with White Citizens' Councils throughout Texas to continue to support segregation in schools and develop an argument against federal government authority based in interposition. President Dwight Eisenhower expressed sympathy for the integrationist cause but declined to intervene to enforce the court order.

Mansfield High School remained segregated until the Voting Rights Act of 1965 threatened its federal funding. A year after the Mansfield Crisis, a similar conflict between a state and a federal court order mandating desegregation resulted in the Little Rock Nine being allowed to attend the predominantly white high school with protection by the National Guard.

== Background ==
Throughout the early twentieth century, schools in the American South were often segregated by race under the legal doctrine of "separate, but equal." This system led to impoverished black schools, which received a much smaller share of public funds and led to severely worse educational outcomes for black students. Texas's educational system also discriminated against Tejanos, who were often also subject to segregated schools until Hernandez v. Texas (1954). Due to the exclusion in education and in many other areas of civic life, many towns featured distinct enclaves where black or Tejano people would create their own informal residential districts.

Mansfield originally developed during the lead-up to the Civil War based around a gristmill, which would provide essential food supplies to the Confederate cause during the war. As the town developed, black residents—often descendants of slaves or sharecroppers—were sequestered to their own neighborhood to the west of Main Street, which functioned as a color line. White Mansfield residents would only employ black people as domestics or in manual laborer, leading some to operate their own businesses or seek opportunity in the growing Dallas-Fort Worth metroplex. The discrimination and access to urban economic opportunity led some black residents to agitate about the status quo. A chapter of the NAACP opened in Mansfield in 1950 and was supported by most black Mansfield residents.

The black school, Mansfield Colored School (MCS), was made up of two poorly built schoolhouses, which lacked electricity, running water, and plumbing. The school only had funds to employ one teacher, who taught all students up to eighth grade. Black students who wanted to attend high school would commute via Trailways bus to Fort Worth to attend one of the two black-only high schools in the multi-county area. The Mansfield Colored School was organized by the local board of education with specific "subtrustees"—often prominent black citizens—to make requests for funds to the board, many of which were denied. In 1953, the white-led Mansfield Independent School District (MISD) opened a separate 17-room elementary school which had 12 teachers and joined the existing Mansfield High School.

In 1954, the Supreme Court ruled in Brown v. Board of Education that segregated schools were unconstitutional. The following year, the court confirmed their decision in Brown II, ruling that schools should desegregate "with all deliberate speed." The University of Texas's law school was ordered in Sweatt v. Painter (1950) that it could not route black applicants to a segregated graduate school, leading many Texan colleges and universities to partially desegregate.

== Early efforts to desegregate ==
On August 17, 1954, after the Brown ruling, T.M. Moody and other black subtrustees formally requested at a school board meeting that the MISD integrate immediately. The board rejected the request. Like many black Mansfield residents, Moody had joined the NAACP and, by 1955, served as the president of the Mansfield branch. Throughout 1954 and early 1955, the subtrustees repeatedly petitioned the board for the legally mandated integration of the schools. They also requested for improvements to MCS and for public busing to the high schools in Fort Worth. The board continued to deny the requests.

Moody and other black Mansfield resident participated in broader NAACP conferences, seeking advice on their work from the NAACP's regional specialist Ulysses Simpson Tate, Thurgood Marshall, and others. When they expressed interest in suing the school board, Tate supplied L. Clifford Davis as the main civil rights lawyer in the region. With Davis, the subtrustees continued to unsuccessfully petition for improvements to MCS—including for smaller improvements, like a flagpole and a fence that would cordon the school off from a busy nearby street—and tried to work with individual board members on their agenda. In the wake of Brown II, Davis described the petitioners' changing philosophy:

At first we were trying to get these small things. And then, when we could not get those things, [we decided] if we're going to have to fight, we're going to just fight the whole battle.

In August 1955, Davis met with the school superintendent and formally tried to enroll Floyd Moody, Charles Moody, and Nathaniel Jackson at Mansfield High School that fall. The three students lived in Mansfield and had attended MCS, but were commuting to Fort Worth to attend I.M. Terrell High School. The superintendent denied the request, saying that the board had not yet decided in favor of desegregation. The school board further discussed segregation at the following meeting, but made no move to accept the enrollment of Jackson and the Moodys. They requested assistance from Tate and Marshall of the NAACP for legal support in a lawsuit against the school district.

== Jackson v. Rawdon lawsuit ==
L. Clifford Davis filed a class action lawsuit on behalf of Floyd Moody, Charles Moody, and Nathaniel Jackson in federal court on October 7, 1955. The MISD, the superintendent, and members of the school board were named as defendants, with Joseph Estes the presiding judge. Davis and the plaintiffs sought participation from other black students who commuted to Fort Worth for high school, but parents feared that it would lead to reprisals from the white community.

Davis argued for the plaintiffs that the rulings in Brown and Brown II (and McKinney v. Blankenship (1955) before the Texas Supreme Court) were definitive, making the exclusion of the black students illegal. Tiny Gooch argued for the defense that public opinion was too set against desegregation and that they would need time for white residents to support the move. Estes found in favor of the MISD. He accepted their argument that desegregation wasn't practicable and also felt that the plaintiffs had not constructed a class because most of the applicable black students had declined to participate. Davis, as well as Tate and Marshall of the NAACP, had expected the loss and primarily fashioned their argument for the appeals process.

On June 28, 1956, Joseph Chappell Hutcheson of the U.S. Fifth Circuit Court of Appeals reversed Estes's judgement. He concluded that while the implementation could proceed in one of multiple ways, the school had to offer a reasonable timeline for desegregation. The case was remanded to Estes to provide further instructions to the parties on August 17. On August 25, Estes decreed that the plaintiffs and all other members of their school-year had the right to attend Mansfield High School and that the defendants were "forever restrained from refusing admission to [...] any of the plaintiffs shown to be qualified in all respects for admission."

After the judgement from the Fifth Circuit, Gooch filed a petition for a stay of proceedings in late August. Supreme Court Justice Hugo Black denied the stay request on September 4. The school board's legal team appealed the case to the Supreme Court on September 25, arguing that the court did not properly consider the local dynamics. On December 3, the full court declined the writ of certiorari.

=== Reactions to lawsuit ===
The white community in Mansfield reacted negatively to news of the lawsuit. Many argued that school desegregation was a plot led by outsiders attempting to carry out a communist agenda. At a public meeting a week after the suit was first filed, some white residents formed a Mansfield chapter of the White Citizen's Council (WCC) to fight desegregation. The group unanimously voted to support the MISD and affirm segregation in their community, with one organizer saying that they would use "grits, guts, and gunpowder" to achieve that goal. All of the school board members on the ballot in April 1956 won re-election, with O.C. Rawdon—named in the case's common shorthand, Jackson v. Rawdon—earning the most votes of any candidate.

In the summer of 1956, Texas—led by Governor Allan Shivers and supported by branches of the WCC—held a statewide referendum that proposed to exempt pupils of integrated schools from compulsory attendance rules, harden state laws against interracial marriage, and implement interposition to help nullify perceived federal interference. Mansfield voters approved the referendum on all three points, with the first question decided by an 85 percent margin. The Fort Worth Star-Telegram ran a series on integration in Mansfield that summer, which reflected hardening views against the court-ordered desegregation.

The black community faced retaliation from the white community. After the appeals process found in favor of integration, Floyd Moody's father J.E. was evicted from his property for his involvement. The MISD also separately cancelled a standing agreement T.M. Moody had to use the well water on the MCS property. In Mansfield's black neighborhood, burning crosses were used to intimate residents on August 22 and 23. Though it's unknown who exactly burned the crosses, historian Robyn Duff Ladino wrote that it was unlikely that it was organized by the Ku Klux Klan or other formal organization. An armed group of black community members protected T.M. Moody after the police declined to, fearing that he would be assassinated. At a meeting of black parents, they initially decided that all but one of the 12 students then commuting to Fort Worth would attempt to enroll at Mansfield High School.

== Rejection of court order ==
The tensions in Mansfield continued to increase after the final instructions from the court on August 25 to integrate. Following the threats against the plaintiffs and the burning crosses in the black community, three black effigies were hung overnight on August 28. One effigy hung on Main Street was bloodied with red paint had signs saying, "This Negro Tried to Enter a School" and "This Would Be A Horrible Way to Die." Others were hung at the Mansfield High School flagpole and above the schoolhouse door. When asked whether he would remove the effigies at the school, the school's principal declined and said he had no part in their display.

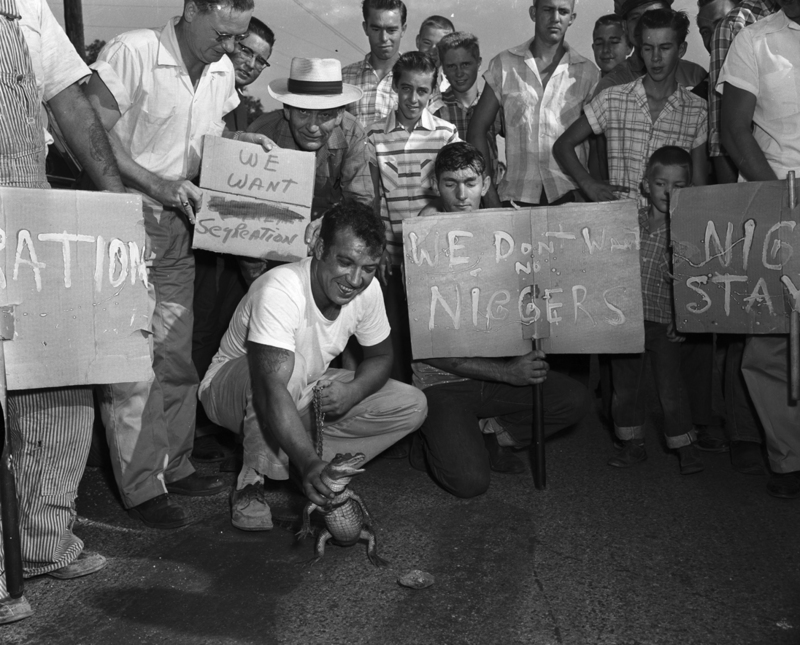
John Pyles holding a baby alligator as a reference to the racial canard that black people are "gator bait," in August 30 protests at Mansfield High School

On August 30, the first day of school registration, a group of dozens of white Mansfield community members, largely men, gathered on the schoolgrounds. Some carried signs with racial epithets and violent language. Over the course of the day, the group grew to as large as 400 people. They also canvassed the businesses on Main Street to close early to participate in the anti-integration demonstration, implying boycotts if they declined. The Mansfield constable requested the assistance of Tarrant County Sheriff Harlon Wright in quelling the crowd. When some leaders of the group implied that they would resort to gunfight to prevent desegregation, Wright threatened the group with arrests if any were found with firearms. Both the mayor and Mansfield police chief left town that evening for the Labor Day weekend.

The mob (Note: One of the demonstration's organizers, Owen Metcalf, commented to a reporter: "There ain't nobody leading this. This is just a damn mob.") regathered early on the morning of August 31 before registration began. They organized around entrances to the school, aiming to prevent any entry by black students. The school's superintendent tacitly supported the demonstrators, pointing out one back entrance they hadn't blocked. Throughout the morning's registration hours, members of the mob talked to press and advocated for continuing segregation. Though neither Davis nor the black students came to the school in person, there were multiple instances of violence. An assistant district attorney for the county had attended, aiming to assess the protests, but he was kicked and pushed, leading to a sheriff escorting him out of the scuffle. A press photographer took pictures of the scuffle, leading to him also being attacked. A second photographer who took pictures of that exchange was accosted and had his camera broken. Some from the crowd separately chased a third photographer—Rufus Hickman, a black man—in his car from Mansfield to Fort Worth, where Hickman hid in a funeral home. Besides the effigies, demonstrators also carried signs with racial threats and parked a truck next to the entrance of the school with different slurs and threats painted in white.

During the day, Shivers authorized the deployment of Texas Rangers to the school to assist local officials. They arrived late into the registration period, with much of the group already dispersed. Former Texas governor and senator Pappy O'Daniel, running as a write-in candidate in the 1956 gubernatorial election, appeared during the demonstrations to canvass and to express his support for the anti-integration cause. There were some demonstrators who resented the more extremist language and opposed desegregation on less aggressive terms, but any pro-integration whites were treated inhospitably by the mob.

The holiday weekend proceeded without any major conflict, with the town busier than usual due to the publicity. A widely circulated false story quoted Floyd Moody as saying that he preferred the Fort Worth school to Mansfield, but that the NAACP had forced him to fight for integration. Davis, speaking to the local news, expressed his puzzlement at the way forward, but said that he may file charges of contempt. On Monday night, the agitators agreed to return to school for the next day—the first day of school—though they doubted any black students would try to register.

The Rangers sent a larger contingent for the Tuesday demonstrations, with six agents in uniform and three undercover. They spoke with Huffman and agreed that if any black students did arrive to register, they would be immediately transferred out—per authorization from the governor—and escorted off the grounds. Members of the mob continued to assert their racial animus, with one attendee bringing a pet monkey that wore a sign saying, "I want to play football at Mansfield High School," mocking two of the black students who were known football players. During the day, one of the mob organizers produced a document that he claimed was signed by the black students and their families, professing no interest in integrating into Mansfield, but the signatories said they never expressed such sentiment. Shortly after the beginning of the school day, a local white Episcopal reverend arrived and chastised the crowd for their racism and unChristian behavior. The crowd reacted violently and a Ranger escorted him out.

While some demonstrators returned later in the week, September 4 was the last day that featured a large mob. The black students did not attend Mansfield. All of the students, including the three students who had sued the school, enrolled in high schools at Fort Worth and planned to stay there until threats of violence had subsided.

=== State response ===
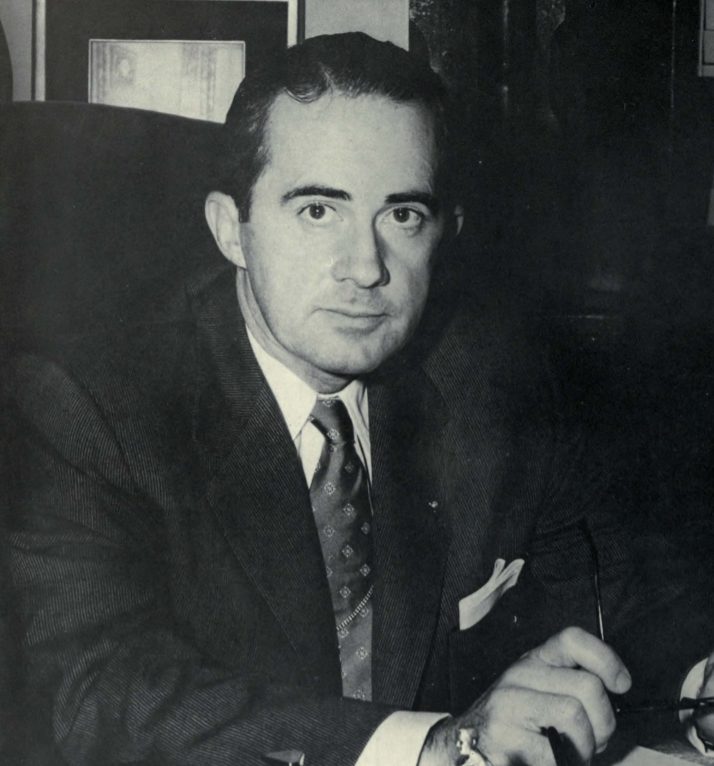
Texas Governor Allan Shivers, pictured in 1956

The district attorney for Tarrant County convened a grand jury to investigate the effigies and threats against black residents. After the August 30 demonstrations, he said that he was making a "stern warning" against violence. Davis, upon news of the demonstration, kept any of the students from trying to register until it was deemed safe. In the early morning of August 31, he sent a telegram to Texas Governor Allan Shivers asking for his assistance in carrying out the court ordered desegregation.

I call upon you as Governor to cause to be dispatched additional law enforcement officers to Mansfield to assure that law and order will be maintained and that these students will be protected in their right to attend Mansfield High School.

Davis also wrote to Homer Garrison, director of the Texas Rangers and Department of Public Safety, asking for the support of state law enforcement. Garrison replied that he could send men only at the sheriff's request. Shivers—a noted segregationist—made a statement demeaning Davis and the NAACP for the desegregation effort and declined to provide state help without a request from the local officials. Later on August 31, Shivers released a memo saying that he asked Garrison to send Rangers to help the authorities "arrest anyone, white or colored, whose actions are such as to represent a threat to the peace at Mansfield." He also spoke with Huffman and the MISD board, publicly authorizing them to transfer out any black students who successfully registered. Shivers also said that he, rather than school officials, would assume any charges of contempt for contravening the court order.

=== Federal response ===
Later on August 31, Davis also telegraphed U.S. Attorney General Herbert Brownell to request his assistance after the governor's refusal to force compliance with the court order. The Department of Justice acknowledged receipt of the telegram, but didn't commit to act. Brownell had previously been in Dallas from August 25 to August 30 and met with Shivers there. He denied that the two discussed civil rights or the ongoing rumors that Eisenhower had planned to replace Richard Nixon with Shivers—a Democrat who publicly supported the Republican Eisenhower—as his running mate. When asked for comment by a reporter on August 31, Eisenhower expressed ambivalence:

I think that no plank could satisfy everybody exactly. [...] I believe we've got to have goodwill and understanding for all. We are not going to settle this thing finally by great show of force and arbitrary action.

During another news conference on September 5, Eisenhower was again asked about Mansfield. He said that he felt the federal government did not have a role in resolving the problem, unless the state could not handle it. In Mansfield, he felt that the state had adequately responded and was then moving to respect the court order. Texas reporter Sarah McClendon challenged the president, citing Shivers's use of the Rangers to support the mob and statements where he expressed plans to continue to defy the court order. Eisenhower said that he hadn't seen the statements in question. Thurgood Marshall and Norman Thomas separately wrote letters to Eisenhower the day after his comments, disputing his version of events and pointing to how Shivers was defying the federal court. Shivers later disputed McClendon's rendering, claiming that the Rangers were present to prevent any violence, that he did not defy the federal government, and that his actions had been successful, as the Mansfield Crisis had ended.

In later comments, Eisenhower expressed more sympathy for the desegregationist cause. He also asked Brownell to investigate the case further. Despite the softening public statements, the federal government did not ensure the order to desegregate was enforced. During the unsuccessful attempt to desegregate Texarkana Junior College on September 17, Eisenhower condemned the expressions of hatred, but did not intervene to support integration. On September 18, Shivers—crossing party lines, as he had in 1952—officially announced his support for Eisenhower's re-election.

== Aftermath and legacy ==
After the mob and the state of Texas successfully stymied the order to desegregate Mansfield High School, white Texans and local officials continued to fight legal efforts to integrate in the state, including later in September 1956 at Texarkana Junior College. The next year, Arkansas Governor Orval Faubus similarly tried to override an attempt to desegregate Little Rock, Arkansas in 1957. As in Texas, the governor supported anti-integration demonstrators and ordered state-level law enforcement to maintain the segregationist status quo. Unlike in Mansfield, the crisis in Little Rock ended with success for the integrationists after President Eisenhower ordered the Arkansas National Guard to intervene on behalf of the black students.

The first integrated class at the high school included Charles Moody, the younger brother of Floyd Moody. Another black student in that class, Brenda Norwood, later taught in the MISD and commented in 2016 that the "old mentality" remained in the town, despite its significant growth and diversification. L. Clifford Davis was elected judge in Tarrant County in 1983, becoming its first black judge He later swore in Mansfield's first black mayor Michael Evans in 2021. The MISD hired its first black superintendent, Tiffanie Spencer, in February 2026.

In March 2026, the Mansfield Historical Society announced plans to commemorate the seventieth anniversary of the Mansfield Crisis with a landmark at the former site of Mansfield High School. The final design hasn't been decided, but the organization will structure it around the theme of "moving from negative to positive." It will rely on donations, with a planned completion date in summer 2027.

=== Texas Ranger statue ===
In June 2020, a statue modeled after Texas Ranger Captain Jay Banks, called One Riot, One Ranger, was removed from Dallas Love Field. It was first dedicated in 1961, five years after the Mansfield School Desegregation Incident. In March 2026, the statue was displayed again in public, at Globe Life Field in Arlington. The statue has drawn criticism from some in the local community, especially the local black community, for the close proximity between Arlington and Mansfield.
