= Jalen Kimber =

American football player (born 2001)

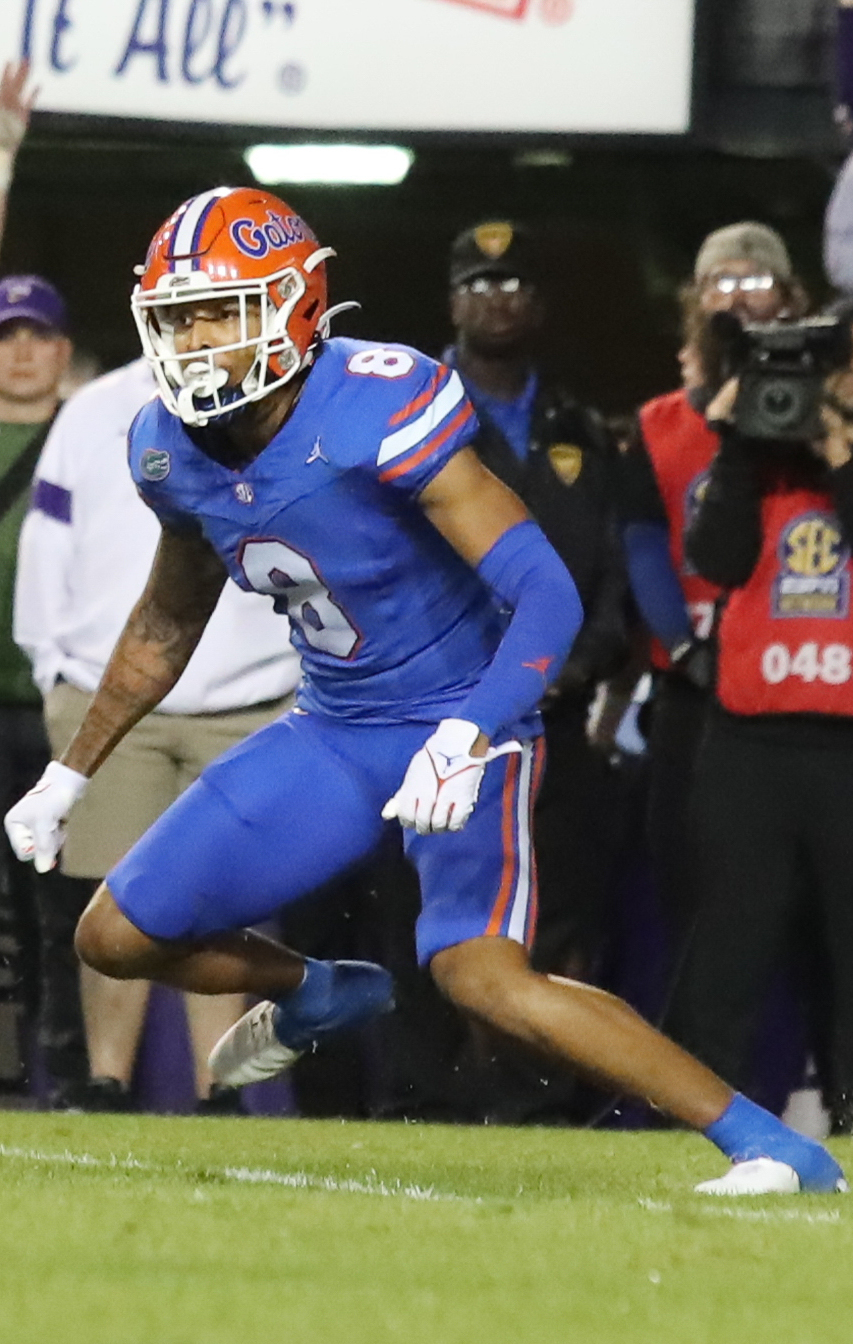

Dallas Renegades
- Position: Cornerback
- Roster status: Unsigned draft pick

Personal information
- Born: February 13, 2001 (age 25); Merrillville, Indiana, U.S.
- Listed height: 6 ft 0 in (1.83 m)
- Listed weight: 190 lb (86 kg)

Career information
- High school: Mansfield Timberview (Arlington, Texas)
- College: Georgia (2020–2021); Florida (2022–2023); Penn State (2024)
- NFL draft: 2025: undrafted

Career history
- Tennessee Titans (2025)*; Buffalo Bills (2025)*; Cincinnati Bengals (2025)*; Dallas Renegades (2027-present)
- * Offseason or practice squad member only

Awards and highlights
- CFP national champion (2021)
- Stats at Pro Football Reference

Jalen Jermaine Kimber (born February 13, 2001) is an American professional football cornerback. He played college football for the Georgia Bulldogs, Florida Gators and Penn State Nittany Lions.

== Early life ==
Kimber attended Mansfield Timberview High School in Arlington, Texas. He was rated as a four-star recruit and the 6th overall cornerback in the class of 2020, and committed to play college football for the Georgia Bulldogs.

== College career ==
=== Georgia ===
In two seasons with the Bulldogs in 2020 and 2021, Kimber made three tackles in just four games. He played one game in 2021 before suffering a season-ending shoulder injury in the team's national championship run. After the 2021 season, Kimber entered his name into the NCAA transfer portal.

=== Florida ===
Kimber transferred to play for the Florida Gators. In week 3 of the 2022 season, Kimber returned an interception 40 yards for a touchdown in a win over South Florida. During his two seasons as a Gator in 2022 and 2023, Kimber played in 25 games with 11 starts, where he recorded 36 tackles, six pass deflections, and an interception. After the 2023 season, he once again entered his name into the NCAA transfer portal.

=== Penn State ===
He transferred to play for the Penn State Nittany Lions. In the 2024 Fiesta Bowl, he notched a career-high six tackles in a win over Boise State. Kimber finished the season with 37 tackles and three pass deflections. After the season, he declared for the 2025 NFL draft and accepted an invite to the 2025 East–West Shrine Bowl.

== Professional career ==
Pre-draft measurables
Height	Weight	Arm length	Hand span	Wingspan	40-yard dash	10-yard split	20-yard split	20-yard shuttle	Three-cone drill	Vertical jump	Broad jump	Bench press
6 ft 0 1/8 in (1.83 m)	190 lb (86 kg)	31 3/8 in (0.80 m)	9 in (0.23 m)	6 ft 3 3/4 in (1.92 m)	4.39 s	1.57 s	2.56 s	4.22 s	6.88 s	33.5 in (0.85 m)	10 ft 3 in (3.12 m)	13 reps
All values from Pro Day

=== Tennessee Titans ===
On May 8, 2025, Kimber signed with the Tennessee Titans as an undrafted free agent after going unselected in the 2025 NFL draft. On August 25, he was waived as part of final roster cuts before the start of the season.

=== Buffalo Bills ===
On August 28, 2025, Kimber signed with the Buffalo Bills' practice squad. Kimber was released by the Bills on September 23 and re-signed to the practice squad on October 7. Kimber was released again on October 14.

=== Cincinnati Bengals ===
On December 2, 2025, Kimber signed with the Cincinnati Bengals' practice squad. He signed a reserve/future contract with Cincinnati on January 5, 2026.

On August 30, 2026, Kimber was waived by the Bengals as a part of final roster cuts.
