= Mansfield Independent School District =

School district in Texas, United States

Location
- Mansfield; Arlington; Burleson; Grand Prairie Region 11 Tarrant and Johnson County; United States

District information
- Type: Independent school district
- Motto: Mansfield ISD: a great place to live, learn & teach.
- Grades: PK–12th
- Superintendent: Tiffanie Spencer
- Schools: 49
- Budget: $368,700,000 (2023-2024)

Students and staff
- Students: 35,722 (2023-2024)
- Staff: 4,853
- Student–teacher ratio: 22:1 elementary 27:1 intermediate 28:1 middle/high
- Athletic conference: 6A - Region 2, District 11; 5A - D1 Region 2, District 8; 5A - D2 Region 2, District 7

Other information
- Website: www.mansfieldisd.org

Mansfield Independent School District is a school district headquartered in Mansfield, Texas, United States.

MISD serves Mansfield and portions of the cities of Grand Prairie, Arlington, and Burleson. A small portion of Cedar Hill, Fort Worth, Kennedale, and Rendon also lie within the district (only in nearby areas). A few Fort Worth and Kennedale residents are zoned mainly to go to Tarver-Rendon Elementary School, and a few Cedar Hill residents are zoned to go to Danny Jones Middle School and Mary Lillard Intermediate School. The district also extends into northeastern Johnson County.

MISD has over 49 schools and district facilities. Among the facilities are six high schools, the Ben Barber Innovation Academy, a competition-level stadium, a natatorium complex, and a center for the performing arts.

In 2011, the school district was rated "Academically Acceptable" by the Texas Education Agency.

== History ==
The district integrated in 1965, the last public school system to do so in the United States.

On June 23, 2020, Mansfield ISD School Board voted to keep their anti-discrimination policies, without mandating inclusive provisions for LGBTQ students and staff. The Mansfield Equality Coalition had requested the Mansfield ISD School Board include sexual orientation, gender identification, and gender expression. Training for LGBTQ issues offered by MISD's human resources is optional.

On October 6, 2021, following a school shooting at Mansfield Timberview High School that injured four, Mansfield ISD organized a meeting with community members to discuss safety measures.

On February 12, 2026, a student-led protest against ICE and TEA regulations on protesting took place at five MISD high school campuses; Mansfield High School, Lake Ridge High School, Timberview High School, Legacy High School and Summit High School. MISD released a statement stating they don’t condone the protesting in a post via Facebook: any student who walked out would be receiving a unexcused absence as consequence.

== Campuses ==
=== Elementary schools (PK-4th) ===
Name	City	Opened	Notes
Charlotte Anderson Elementary School	Arlington	2017	2011 bond package replaced original campus opened in 1986
J. L. Boren Elementary School	Mansfield	2015	2011 bond package replaced original campus opened in 1979
Janet Brockett Elementary School	Arlington	2005	2003 bond package
Willie E. Brown Academy of Young Scholars	Mansfield	1998	
Louise Cabaniss Elementary School	Grand Prairie	2008	2003 bond package
Anna May Daulton Elementary School	Grand Prairie	2005	2003 bond package
Kenneth Davis Elementary School	Arlington	2001	
Imogene Gideon Elementary School	Arlington	2001	
Glenn Harmon Elementary School	Arlington	2016	2011 bond package replaced original campus opened in 1988
Carol Holt Elementary School	Arlington	2007	
Thelma Jones Elementary School	Arlington	2003	2001 bond package
Judy K. Miller Elementary School	Mansfield	2015	2006 bond package
D. P. Morris Elementary School	Arlington	1998	
Erma Nash Elementary School	Mansfield	2003	2001 bond package replaced original campus opened in 1953
Nancy Neal Elementary School	Mansfield	2011	2006 bond package
Annette Perry Elementary School	Mansfield	2009	2006 bond package
Alice Ponder Elementary School	Mansfield	2015	2011 bond package replaced original campus opened in 1967
Martha Reid Leadership Academy	Arlington	2004	2001 bond package
Mary Jo Sheppard Elementary School	Mansfield	2005	2001 bond package
Elizabeth Smith Innovative Learning Academy	Mansfield	2004	2001 bond package
Cora Spencer Elementary School	Grand Prairie	2006	2003 bond package
Tarver-Rendon School of Agricultural Leadership	Burleson	2013	2011 bond package replaced original campus opened in 1969
Roberta Tipps Elementary School	Mansfield	2003	2001 bond package
Brenda Norwood Elementary School	Mansfield	2021	2017 bond package
Sarah K. Jandrucko Academy for Early Learners	Arlington	2019	

=== Intermediate schools (5th-6th) ===
Name	City	Opened	Notes
Della Icenhower Intermediate School	Arlington	2004	2001 bond package
Mary Lillard Intermediate School	Mansfield	2006	2003 bond package
Asa E. Low Jr. Intermediate School	Mansfield	2009	2006 bond package
Mary Orr Intermediate School	Mansfield	1998	Replaced original campus
Donna Shepard Leadership Academy	Mansfield	2001	
Cross Timbers Intermediate School	Arlington	1994	
Alma Martinez Intermediate School	Mansfield	2021	2017 bond package

=== Middle schools (7th-8th) ===
Name	City	Opened	Notes
James Coble Middle School	Arlington	2006	2003 bond package
T. A. Howard Middle School	Arlington	1994	
Linda Jobe Middle School	Mansfield	2009	2006 bond package
Danny Jones Middle School	Mansfield	2004	2001 bond package
Brooks Wester Middle School	Mansfield	2002	Built as Mansfield High School in 1974; renamed Mansfield High School - South Campus in 1998; Became Brooks Wester Middle School in 2002
Rogene Worley Middle School	Mansfield	1986	
Charlene McKinzey Middle School	Mansfield	2021	2017 bond package
Jerry Knight STEM Academy	Mansfield	2017	Grades 6-8

=== High schools (9th-12th) ===
Name	City	Opened	Notes
Mansfield High School	Mansfield	2002	Original campus opened in 1909 (now administration building); Replaced campus built in 1974 (now Brooks Wester Middle School);
Frontier High School	Mansfield	2010	Opened inside Ben Barber Career Tech Academy in 2004
Lake Ridge High School	Mansfield	2012	2006 bond package
Legacy High School	Mansfield	2007	2003 bond package
Summit High School	Arlington	2002	Build as Mansfield High School - North Campus in 1998 and renamed Summit High School in 2002
Timberview High School	Arlington	2004	2001 bond package. Shooting in 2021.

=== Alternative schools ===
Name	City	Opened	Notes
The Phoenix Academy	Mansfield	2003	Built as Erma Nash Elementary School in 1953
Ben Barber Innovation Academy	Mansfield	2004	
Early College High School	Arlington	2017	Housed in Timberview High School for 9th and 10th grades, Tarrant County College - Southeast Campus for 11th and 12th grades.
Summit P-TECH Academy	Arlington	2024	Housed in Summit High School

== Controversies ==
In February 2020, the school district paid a $100,000 settlement to Charlotte Anderson Elementary School teacher Stacy Bailey. She had been placed on paid administrative leave for showing her students a picture of her fiancee, who is a woman. The district also agreed to remove the eight-month leave from her record, and offer training on LGBTQ issues to human resources and counseling staff.

Mansfield Crisis

== See also ==
- List of school districts in Texas
