= Mansfield High School (Mansfield, Texas) =

Coordinates: 32.572473°N 97.091096°W

Location
- 3001 East Broad Street; Mansfield, Texas 76063; United States

Information
- Motto: Where Every Story Matters
- Established: 1909 (current building in 2002)
- Oversight: Mansfield ISD
- Principal: Kourtney Gates
- Teaching staff: 145.61 (FTE)
- Grades: 9–12
- Enrollment: 2,593 (2023–2024)
- Student to teacher ratio: 17.81
- Colors: Black and gold
- Athletics conference: 6A
- Nickname: Tigers
- Rival: Mansfield Summit High School; Lake Ridge High School
- Website: mansfield.mansfieldisd.org

Mansfield High School is a public secondary school located at 3001 East Broad Street in Mansfield, Texas, United States. Part of the Mansfield Independent School District, the school serves a portion of Mansfield. As of 2018, the school had 2,688 students. Mansfield High School is known for their baseball and golf sports programs. It is noted for its resistance to desegregation in a 1956 incident.

== Academics ==
Mansfield High School is the top-performing high school in Mansfield, with a 96% graduation rate, and 83% proficiency in Reading and 85% proficiency in Mathematics. Mansfield offers 24 AP courses, ranging from Human Geography to Calculus BC. The average AP enrollment is 40% and the average pass rate is 46%.

== Feeder patterns ==
The following elementary schools feed into Mansfield High School:

- Boren
- Brown
- Nash (partial)
- Reid
- Perry(partial)
- Norwood(partial)

The following intermediate schools feed into Mansfield High School:

- Asa Low (partial)
- Orr (partial)
- Martinez(partial)

The following middle schools feed into Mansfield High School:

- Wester (partial)
- Worley (partial)
- McKinzey(partial)

== Notable alumni ==
- Richard R. Poling, 1926, creator of a college football ratings system
- Kennedy Brooks, 2017, Oklahoma Sooners football running back
- David Cook, Republican member of the Texas House of Representatives and former mayor of Mansfield
- Sam Hilliard, 2012, MLB outfielder for the Colorado Rockies
- Adrianne Jones, murder victim
- Toby Onwumere, actor
- David Murray, YouTube content creator
- Lenzy Pipkins, 2012, American football player
- Hassan Ridgeway, 2012, American football player
- Stepfan Taylor, 2009, former NFL running back for the Arizona Cardinals
- Trystan Andrew Terrell, 2015, perpetrator of the 2019 University of North Carolina at Charlotte shooting
- Jordan Walden, 2006, former MLB pitcher
- Sean Williams, 2004, professional basketball player
