= David Anenih =

American football player (born 1999)

Profile
- Position: Linebacker

Personal information
- Born: August 15, 1999 (age 27); Arlington, Texas, U.S.
- Listed height: 6 ft 2 in (1.88 m)
- Listed weight: 245 lb (111 kg)

Career information
- High school: Mansfield Timberview (Arlington, Texas)
- College: Houston (2017–2021)
- NFL draft: 2022: undrafted

Career history
- Tennessee Titans (2022)*; Pittsburgh Steelers (2022)*; Atlanta Falcons (2022); Arizona Cardinals (2023)*; Miami Dolphins (2024)*; Philadelphia Eagles (2024)*; San Antonio Brahmas (2025)
- * Offseason or practice squad member only
- Stats at Pro Football Reference

David Anenih (ə-NEE-nee) (born August 15, 1999) is an American professional football linebacker. He played college football at Houston, and originally signed with the Tennessee Titans as an undrafted free agent in 2022. Anenih has also played for the Pittsburgh Steelers, Atlanta Falcons, and Arizona Cardinals.

== Early life ==
David Anenih was born on August 15, 1999, in Arlington, Texas. Anenih attended Mansfield Timberview High School where he played track and field and football and was also an honorable mention for class 5A All-State football in Texas. He is of Nigerian descent.

== College career ==
Anenih was rated as the number thirteen player in the state of Texas, and chose to attend Houston University over Kansas State University, Oklahoma State University, Texas Tech University, and others. As a true freshman, Anenih appeared in nine games where he totaled six tackles, of which two were sacks. As a sophomore, Anenih then played in thirteen games and improved his defensive numbers, becoming third on the team with four sacks. Anenih further improved his output on the Houston defense as a junior, registering five sacks, which were tied for the team total. Due to the shortened year in 2020 caused by COVID-19, Anenih was only able to play in eight games. Despite this, Anenih still registered the fifth most total sacks in The American Athletic Conference. Anenih finished his final season for Houston at the peak of his college performance, appearing in fourteen games and was nominated to be on the All-American Conference First Team.

== Professional career ==
Pre-draft measurables
Height	Weight	Arm length	Hand span	40-yard dash	10-yard split	20-yard split	20-yard shuttle	Vertical jump	Broad jump	Bench press
6 ft 2 in (1.88 m)	245 lb (111 kg)	34 3/8 in (0.87 m)	9 1/2 in (0.24 m)	4.74 s	1.67 s	2.71 s	4.50 s	36.5 in (0.93 m)	10 ft 3 in (3.12 m)	25 reps
All values from Pro Day

=== Tennessee Titans ===
After going undrafted in the 2022 NFL draft, Anenih was signed as an undrafted free agent by the Tennessee Titans. He was waived during final roster cuts on August 30. Anenih had his contract terminated while on the practice squad on September 14.

=== Pittsburgh Steelers ===
After being released from the Tennessee Titans, Anenih was signed to the Pittsburgh Steelers practice squad on October 11.

=== Atlanta Falcons ===
On December 20, 2022, the Atlanta Falcons signed Anenih to their active roster from the Steelers' practice squad.

On May 15, 2023, Anenih was waived by the Falcons.

=== Arizona Cardinals ===
On July 29, 2023, Anenih signed with the Arizona Cardinals. On August 29, Anenih was released by the Cardinals as part of final roster cuts before the start of the season.

=== Miami Dolphins ===
On August 12, 2024, Anenih signed with the Miami Dolphins. He was waived on August 27.

=== Philadelphia Eagles ===
On September 18, 2024, Anenih was signed to the Philadelphia Eagles practice squad. He was released on November 22.

=== San Antonio Brahmas ===
On April 18, 2025, Anenih signed with the San Antonio Brahmas of the United Football League (UFL).
