= Lenzy Pipkins =

American football player (born 1993)

No. 41, 37
- Position: Cornerback

Personal information
- Born: November 7, 1993 (age 33); Arlington, Texas, U.S.
- Listed height: 6 ft 0 in (1.83 m)
- Listed weight: 196 lb (89 kg)

Career information
- High school: Mansfield (Mansfield, Texas)
- College: Oklahoma State
- NFL draft: 2017: undrafted

Career history
- Green Bay Packers (2017); Indianapolis Colts (2018); Detroit Lions (2018); Cleveland Browns (2018–2019)*; New England Patriots (2020)*
- * Offseason or practice squad member only

Career NFL statistics
- Total tackles: 24
- Pass deflections: 1
- Stats at Pro Football Reference

Lenzy Ramon Pipkins (born November 7, 1993) is an American former professional football player who was a cornerback in the National Football League (NFL). He played college football at Louisiana–Monroe Warhawks and Oklahoma State Cowboys. He was signed by the Green Bay Packers as an undrafted free agent in 2017.

== Early life ==
Pipkins played high school football at Mansfield High School in Mansfield, Texas, when he recorded 52 tackles, 7 pass breakups, and 1 interception his senior year. That was his only season of high school football. He had previously not played football since the eighth grade. He lettered one season in football, three seasons in basketball and three seasons in track at Mansfield High.

== College career ==
Pipkins played for the Warhawks of the University of Louisiana at Monroe from 2013 to 2015. He was redshirted in 2012. He played in all 12 games, starting 3, in 2013, recording 12 solo tackles, 12 tackle assists, 1 interception and 3 pass breakups. Pipkins played in 9 games, all starts, in 2014, recording 24 solo tackles, 8 tackle assists, 1 sack, 1 interception and 2 pass breakups while also missing 3 games due to injury. He played in all 13 games, starting 10, in 2015, recording 34 solo tackles, 14 tackle assists, 1 sack, 2 pass breakups and 1 forced fumble. He graduated from Louisiana–Monroe after the 2015 season. Pipkins transferred to play for the Cowboys of Oklahoma State University in 2016. He played in all 13 games in 2016, recording 24 solo tackles, 14 tackle assists, 1 interception and 2 pass breakups. He played in 47 games, starting 22, during his college career, recording 94 solo tackles, 48 tackle assists and 3 interceptions.

== Professional career ==
Pipkins was rated the 69th best cornerback in the 2017 NFL draft by NFLDraftScout.com.

Pre-draft measurables
Height	Weight	40-yard dash	10-yard split	20-yard split	20-yard shuttle	Three-cone drill	Vertical jump	Broad jump	Bench press	Wonderlic
6 ft 0 in (1.83 m)	196 lb (89 kg)	4.46 s	1.51 s	2.59 s	4.40 s	7.31 s	33 1/2 in (0.85 m)	9 ft 5 in (2.87 m)	11 reps	21
All values from Oklahoma State Pro Day

After going undrafted, Pipkins signed with the Green Bay Packers on May 5, 2017. In Week 6 of the 2017 season against the Minnesota Vikings, Pipkins recorded his first six career tackles.

Pipkins was traded to the Indianapolis Colts on August 26, 2018 in exchange for linebacker Antonio Morrison. He was waived on September 2, 2018 and was re-signed to the practice squad two days later. He was promoted to the active roster on September 11, 2018. He was waived again on September 22, 2018 and re-signed back to the practice squad. He was promoted back to the active roster on October 4, 2018. He was waived again on October 9, 2018.

On October 10, 2018, Pipkins was claimed off waivers by the Detroit Lions. He was waived on November 12, 2018.

On November 19, 2018, Pipkins was signed to the Cleveland Browns practice squad. The Browns signed Pipkins to a futures contract on January 2, 2019. Pipkins was waived by the Browns on August 31, 2019.

On February 11, 2020, Pipkins was signed by the New England Patriots. On July 25, 2020, the Patriots released Pipkins before training camp opened.

== Career statistics ==
=== NFL ===
Year	Team	GP	GS	Tackles					Interceptions						Fumbles	
Year	Team	GP	GS	Total	Solo	Ast	Sck	SFTY	PDef	Int	Yds	Avg	Lng	TDs	FF	FR
2017	GB	12	1	15	11	4	0.0	0	1	0	0	0	0	0	0	0
Total		12	1	15	11	4	0.0	0	1	0	0	0	0	0	0	0
Source: NFL.com

=== College ===
Year	Team	Games		Tackles				Interceptions						Fumbles	
Year	Team	G	GS	Total	Solo	Ast	Sck	PDef	Int	Yds	Avg	Lng	TDs	FF	FR
2013	ULM	12	3	24	12	12	0.0	4	1	35	35.0	35	0	0	0
2014	ULM	9	9	32	24	8	1.0	3	1	17	17.0	17	0	0	0
2015	ULM	13	10	48	34	14	1.0	2	0	0	0.0	0	0	1	0
2016	OSU	13	0	38	24	14	0.0	3	1	0	0.0	0	0	0	0
Total		47	22	142	94	48	2.0	12	3	52	17.3	35	0	1	0
Source: OKState.com

== Personal life ==
Pipkins's cousin, C. J. Wilson, also played football in the NFL.
