= Mansfield Legacy High School =

Coordinates: 32.580769°N 97.152817°W

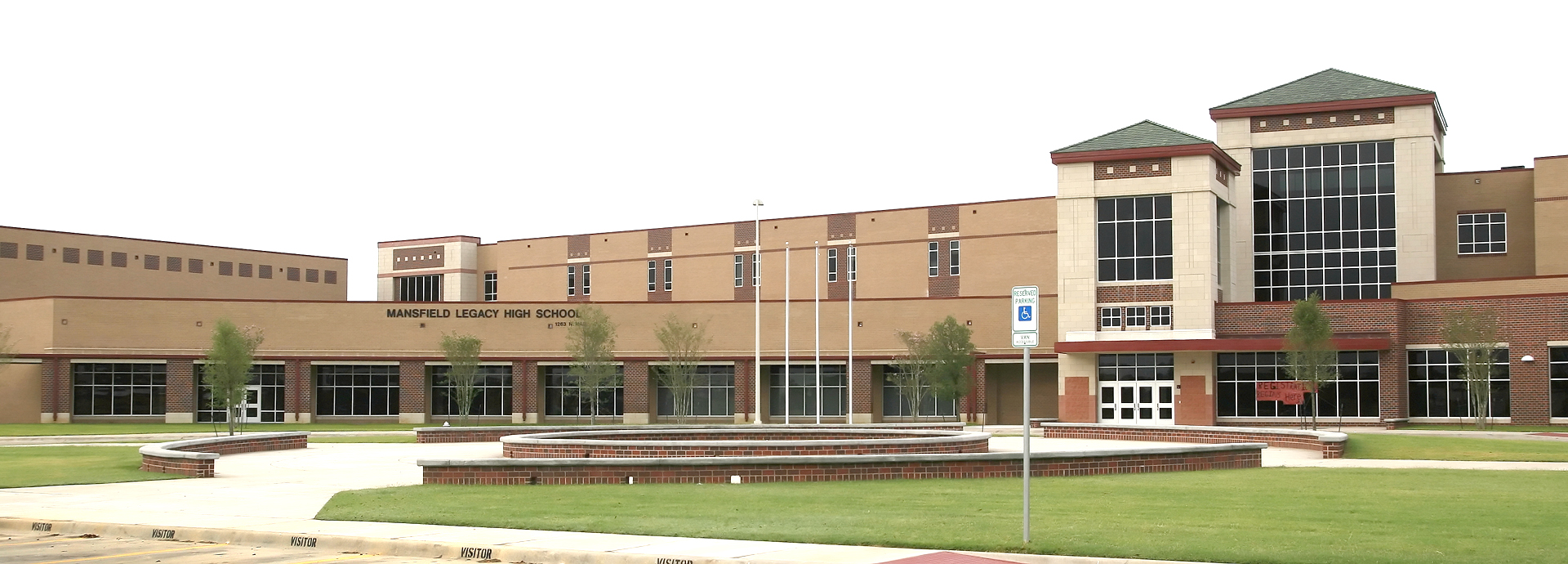

Location
- 1263 North Main St. Mansfield, Texas; Mansfield, Tarrant County, Texas 76063; United States

Information
- Type: Public, Co-ed
- Motto: Your Legacy Starts Here!
- Established: 2007
- School district: Mansfield ISD
- Superintendent: Dr. Kimberley Cantu
- Principal: Ruben Molinar
- Teaching staff: 147.46 (FTE)
- Grades: 9-12
- Average class size: 20-28
- Student to teacher ratio: 17.22
- Hours in school day: 7:25-2:55
- Campus: Suburban
- Colors: Red, black, and silver
- Fight song: We are the Broncos we are red, black and white We are the Broncos we will put up a fight Now let’s go Broncos get up on your feet. So we can cheer and bring the heat. We will be loud and proud - a big family And we will come as one and have victory Now let’s go Broncos get up on your feet No, we will not accept defeat. B-R-O-N-C-O-S Broncos, Broncos, Go Broncos; We are the Broncos we are red, black and white We are the Broncos we will put up a fight Now let’s go Broncos get set for a win We’ll be victorious ‘till the end!
- Nickname: Broncos
- Publication: therideronline.com
- Newspaper: The Rider
- Yearbook: The Arena
- Alma Mater: Mansfield Legacy; Filled with history- With heart, we proudly stand by you. Merit and quality Our school's destiny- Black and red, we will be true. Our heritage well-known With the future clear- The Broncos or Legacy; Success starts here!
- Website: legacy.mansfieldisd.org

Mansfield Legacy High School is a public secondary school located in Mansfield, Texas, United States.

The school is a part of the Mansfield Independent School District and serves sections of the cities of Mansfield and Arlington as well as unincorporated sections of Tarrant County. Legacy is built on the location of the men’s club. When Mansfield was a small rural community (in the southeast of Ft. Worth), the Kowbell Rodeo was a popular stopping place for cowboys. The land on former US Highway 287, now Business 287, was the place to go for an indoor rodeo experience.

== History ==
William H. (Bill) Hogg, a lifetime resident of Mansfield, opened the Kowbell Indoor Rodeo in 1959. Rodeos were held each Saturday night, year around. The Arena was built originally with an open roof and a canvas top that could be lowered for shelter during inclement weather.

The Kowbell Rodeo closed, and the property was sold to MISD in 2004. Because of Mansfield's fast population growth, MISD administrators purchased the historic location to build the district's fourth high school. After clearing land and deciding on blueprints, newly hired principal, David Wright, formed a committee to create the school's name and mascot. Legacy fit perfectly. Broncos fit even better. In June 2006, committee members chose red and black as the colors. Legacy High School was turned over to MISD in June 2007 by the builder and school opened, with over 2,100 students, on August 27, 2007.

== Feeder patterns ==
The following elementary schools feed into Mansfield Legacy High School:

- Holt (partial)
- Nash (partial)
- Neal
- Norwood (partial)
- Perry (partial)
- Ponder
- Sheppard
- Tarver-Rendon

The following intermediate schools feed into Mansfield Legacy High School:

- Cross Timbers (partial)
- Martinez (partial)
- Orr (partial)
- Shepard (partial)

The following middle schools feed into Mansfield Legacy High School:

- Howard (partial)
- Jobe (partial)
- McKinzey (partial)
- Worley (partial)

== Notable alumni ==
- Ryan Kirby (2008), Vocalist of Fit For A King
- Noah Syndergaard (2010), MLB All-Star pitcher
- Josh Doctson (2011), NFL wide receiver
- Tevin Mitchel (2011), NFL cornerback
- Rees Odhiambo (2011), NFL offensive lineman
- Tejay Antone (2012), MLB pitcher
- Kade Strowd (2015), baseball player in the Baltimore Orioles organization
- Jalen Catalon (2019), football player for the Missouri Tigers
- Tru Edwards (2019), NFL wide receiver for the Los Angeles Rams
- Harmoni Turner (2021), WNBA player
