= L. Clifford Davis =

American civil rights pioneer and attorney (1924–2025)

- Born: October 12, 1924; Wilton, Arkansas, U.S.
- Died: February 15, 2025 (aged 100); Fort Worth, Texas, U.S.
- Education: Philander Smith College; Howard University School of Law
- Occupations: Attorney; judge; civil rights advocate
- Spouse: Ethel Weaver (died 2015)
- Children: 2

L. Clifford Davis (October 12, 1924 – February 15, 2025) was an American attorney whose unsuccessful efforts for admission to the University of Arkansas Law School resulted in the eventual admission of African-American students to the school. He also served over thirty years as an attorney and judge, and assisted Thurgood Marshall in the Brown v. Board of Education case.

== Background ==
L. Clifford Davis was born in Wilton, Arkansas, on October 12, 1924. Since the town's educational opportunities for black students ended in the eighth grade, Clifton attended high school at Dunbar High School in Little Rock, where his parents began renting a home. He graduated from Philander Smith College in 1945, where he studied business. The state paid tuition for Davis to attend a school out of state to avoid having him in a classroom with white students, but when Davis realized the higher cost of living at Howard University in Washington, D.C. far outweighed the cost of tuition, he insisted on applying to U of A. In 1947, after applying to the University of Arkansas Law School for two years, he was granted admission under the circumstance that he would not be allowed to enter a room with white students in it, including classrooms, the library and the restrooms. Davis instead completed his law degree at Howard University in 1949 and then returned to Arkansas.

== Career ==
Davis passed the bar and set up a practice in Pine Bluff, Arkansas. In 1952, he moved to Waco, Texas, to teach at Paul Quinn College. He took and passed the bar exam in Texas and in 1954 became one of only two black lawyers in Fort Worth, Texas. In 1956, he filed a federal lawsuit which resulted in a court order for integration of the public schools in Mansfield, Texas, although the threat of violence from white students kept those schools segregated for some time. In 1959, in Flax v. Potts, he won a suit forcing the Fort Worth schools to integrate. He organized the Fort Worth Black Bar Association in 1977. In 1983, Governor Mark White appointed him to a judgeship in criminal district court. He continued to serve as a judge until he lost an election in 1988, then continued as a visiting judge until 2004.

Awards and honors included the NAACP’s William Robert Ming Award, the Blackstone Award (the highest honor given by the Tarrant County Bar Association), the National Bar Association Hall of Fame, and a Lifetime Achievement award from Texas Lawyer. An elementary school in Fort Worth, Texas, bears his name. In 2017, at age 92, the University of Arkansas School of Law granted him an honorary doctorate, in place of the one he was denied in 1949.

== Personal life and death ==
Davis and his wife, the former Ethel Weaver (d. 2015), had two children. He was a member of a United Methodist Church in Fort Worth.

Davis died at a Fort Worth nursing home on February 15, 2025, at the age of 100.
