= Mansfield Timberview High School =

Coordinates: 32.622082°N 97.077888°W

- 7700 South Watson Road; Arlington, Texas 76002; United States

Information
- Type: Public
- Motto: Value-Inspired Excellence
- Established: 2004
- School district: Mansfield ISD
- Principal: Dr. Nastassia Neal
- Staff: 125.30 (FTE)
- Grades: 9-12
- Student to teacher ratio: 14.58
- Campus type: Suburban
- Colors: Maroon, Silver and Black
- Fight song: Hail to the Wo-olves, the greatest Hail to the Pride of Mansfield; Hail! Hail to Tim-ber-view the maroon, silver and black Hail to the Wo-olves, the greatest, Hail to the pride of Te-xas; Hail! Hail to Tim-ber-view; The migh-ty Wolf pack! M...T...H...S MTHS; We are the best!
- Athletics conference: 5A
- Mascot: Wolf
- Alma Mater: Timberview... Our dreams and Hopes we have for you Timberview... We honor Everything we do... To give our very best to Always fight for thee O Timberview; We hold you up So high and true For Victory...
- Website: http://timberview.mansfieldisd.org/

Mansfield Timberview High School (THS) is a secondary school located in Arlington, Texas, United States. It is a Mansfield Independent School District campus. Its mascot is the wolf. Timberview High School was named an AVID National Demonstration School in 2016 and an AVID School-wide Site of Distinction in 2017. The school serves sections of Arlington, Mansfield, and Grand Prairie. Timberview serves several communities, including Lake Port Village.

== History ==
On October 6, 2021, just after 9:15 a.m., three people were shot, including a teacher and a pair of students attending Mansfield Timberview High School, one of whom was left in critical condition. A fourth victim, a pregnant teacher, accidentally wounded herself while trying to make an escape, and six shots were fired in total during the shooting. The shooter was identified as Timothy George Simpkins, an 18-year-old senior Black male student. He fled the scene but turned himself in later that day. Simpkins faced three counts of assault with a deadly weapon, and on July 20, 2023, he was found guilty of attempted capital murder. On July 24, 2023, Simpkins was sentenced to twelve years in prison. The shooting prompted authorities to monitor video feeds in real time and conduct random canine searches in classrooms.

On January 13, 2025, a wounded victim of the school shooting was shot again in a separate incident and died. The victim was identified as 19-year-old Zacchaeus Selby. In March 2025, 17-year-old Joshua Robinson was arrested and charged with Selby's murder.

== Feeder patterns ==
The following elementary schools feed into Mansfield Timberview High School: Brockett, Gideon, Thelma Jones, and Cabaniss.

Icenhower Intermediate School feeds into Mansfield Timberview High School. Coble Middle School feeds into Mansfield Timberview High School.

== Athletics ==
State titles:

- (2008–2009) Girls' Track
- (2009–2010) Girls' Basketball
- (2016–2017) Men's Basketball
- (2018–2019) Boys' Basketball
- (2025–2026) Boys' Track

== Notable alumni ==
- Michael Choice, 2007, baseball player
- Marcus Cromartie, 2008, football player
- Jalen Jones, 2011, basketball player for Hapoel Haifa in the Israeli Basketball Premier League
- Aldrich Bailey, 2012, track and field sprinter for the Texas A&M Aggies
- Alex Robinson, 2014, basketball player for the TCU Horned Frogs
- David Anenih, 2017, American football player
- Chennedy Carter, 2017, professional basketball player for the Las Vegas Aces who also played for Texas A&M
- Isaac Likekele, 2018, college basketball player
- Kaash Paige, 2019, Dallas singer and songwriter signed to Def Jam Recordings
- Jalen Kimber, 2020, NFL football cornerback for the Tennessee Titans
