= Lake Ridge High School =

Location
- 101 North Day Miar Road; Mansfield, Texas 76063; United States; 32.5715°N 97.0558°W

Information
- Type: Public
- Motto: Soar Into Your Destiny
- Established: 2012
- School district: Mansfield ISD
- Principal: Katrina Mabry-Smith
- Faculty: 153.97 (FTE)
- Grades: 9-12
- Student to teacher ratio: 18.00
- Hours in school day: 7:25-2:55
- Campus type: Suburban
- Colors: Hunter green, black and white
- Athletics conference: 6A
- Mascot: Eagle
- Website: lakeridge.mansfieldisd.org

Lake Ridge High School is a secondary school located in Mansfield, Texas, serving grades 9-12. It is one of seven Mansfield Independent School District high schools. Its mascot is the eagle.

== Enrollment statistics ==
As of the 2015-2016 school year, there were 2,106 students enrolled, 71 percent of which were minority students. 24 percent were economically disadvantaged, with 19 percent qualifying for free lunch and 5 percent for reduced price lunch.

== Feeder schools ==
The following elementary schools feed into Lake Ridge High School:

- Daulton (partial)
- Miller
- Norwood (partial)
- Perry (partial)
- Smith
- Spencer

The following intermediate schools feed into Lake Ridge High School:

- Lillard
- Martinez (partial)

The following middle schools feed into Lake Ridge High School:

- Jones
- McKinzey (partial)

== Notable alumni ==
- Ryan Woolridge (class of 2015), basketball player for the Windy City Bulls (2025-) among other teams
- Jett Duffey, former college football quarterback for the Texas Tech Red Raiders and the Hampton Pirates
- Malik Knowles (class of 2018), former football player for Kansas State (2018-2022)
- Jasmine Moore, two-time olympian and the 2024 Olympic bronze medalists in the triple jump and long jump
- Jason Bean (class of 2017), former football player for University of North Texas (2018–2020) and University of Kansas (2021–2023).
- Caleb Rogers, football player for the Las Vegas Raiders (2025-)
- Chandler Rogers, football player for the Louisville Kings (2026-)
- Robert Spears-Jennings, football player for the Pittsburgh Steelers (2026-)
- Felix Ojo (class of 2026), football player for Texas Tech University (2026-)
