= Mansfield, Texas =

- City
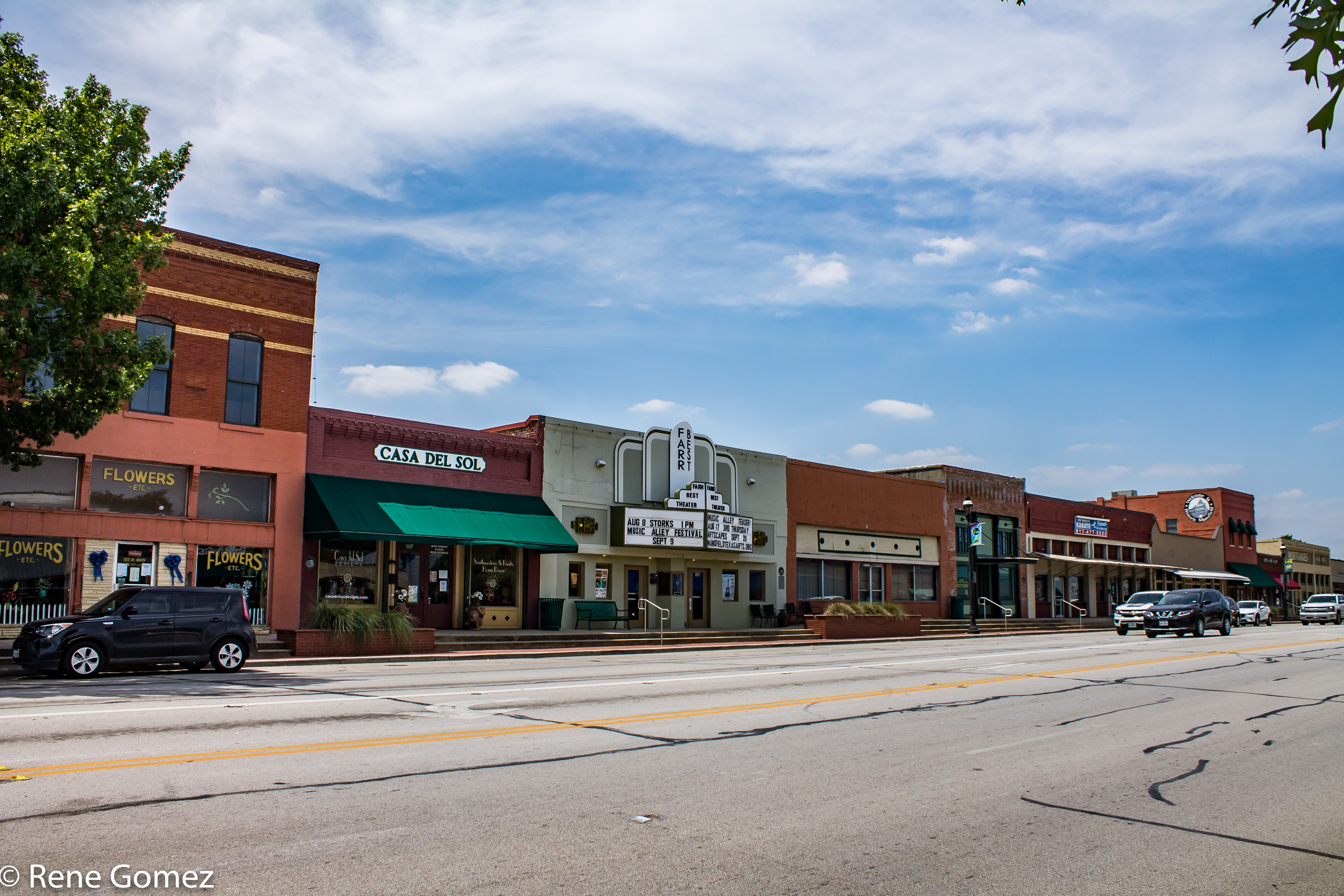
- Downtown Mansfield (2017)

- Location of Mansfield in Tarrant County, Texas
- Coordinates: 32°33′49″N 97°08′31″W
- Country: United States
- State: Texas
- Counties: Tarrant, Johnson, Ellis

Government
  - Type: Council-Manager

Area
  - City: 36.66 sq mi (94.96 km^{2})
  - Land: 36.62 sq mi (94.85 km^{2})
  - Water: 0.042 sq mi (0.11 km^{2})
- Elevation: 591 ft (180 m)

Population (2020)
  - City: 72,602
  - Estimate (2025): 84,444
  - Rank: (US: 478th)
  - Density: 1,982/sq mi (765.4/km^{2})
  - Urban: 5,732,354 (6th)
  - Metro: 7,637,387 (4th)
- Demonym: Mansfielder
- Time zone: UTC-6 (CST)
  - Summer (DST): UTC-5 (CDT)
- ZIP code: 76063
- Area codes: 817, 682
- FIPS code: 48-46452
- GNIS feature ID: 2411023
- Website: mansfieldtexas.gov

Mansfield is a city in the U.S. state of Texas, and a suburb of the Dallas-Fort Worth metro area. The city is located mostly in Tarrant County, with small parts in Ellis and Johnson counties. Its location is approximately 30 miles from Dallas and 20 miles from Fort Worth, and is adjacent to Arlington. As of the 2020 census, the population was 72,602, up from 56,368 in 2010.

== History ==
The first wave of European settlers arrived in the rolling Cross Timbers country of north central Texas in the 1840s. Primarily of Scotch-Irish origins, these pioneer farmers came for the most part from southern states, following the frontier as it shifted west of the Mississippi. They entered an area where Native Americans had been living for thousands of years. The Comanche posed a serious threat to the settlers, and in 1849, the U.S. Army established Fort Worth to protect the farms along the sparsely populated frontier.

The area southeast of the fort (and of the Trinity River) was well protected and presumably fairly well settled by the early 1850s. In one well-documented case, eight related families migrated to the area in 1853 from Illinois. Three of the four Gibson brothers in this group established homesteads about 4 miles (6 km) northwest of present-day Mansfield. This settlement, which became known as the Gibson Community, included a school and a church building by 1860.

When Ralph Sandiford Man and Julian Feild arrived around 1856 and built a grist mill at the crossroads that was to become the center of Mansfield, the beginnings of the community probably existed in the oak groves bordering Walnut Creek (originally called Cedar Bluff Creek). The Walnut Creek Congregation of the Cumberland Presbyterian Church had organized itself in 1854. Members met in each other's homes, so it is suspected that there was a cluster of houses in the area.

In 1856, Julian Feild purchased 540 acres (2.2 km^{2}) in the Mansfield area. Man and Feild completed their three-story brick grist mill sometime between 1856 and 1859. The mill, which produced flour and meal, was the first built in North Texas to utilize steam power and enjoyed patronage as far south as San Antonio and as far north as Oklahoma. The location of the mill in southeastern Tarrant County perhaps reflects the advanced state of wheat cultivation in the area and the ready availability of wood to feed the mill's steam boilers.

Feild opened a general merchandise store at the same time as the mill, located across Broad Street. He built a log house for his family, which also served as an inn for travelers and customers. By 1860, the nucleus of the future city existed. The first post office was established that year, with Julian Feild as postmaster.

During the American Civil War, the Man and Feild Mill supplied meal and flour to the Confederate States Army, hauling it to Shreveport, Louisiana, and Jefferson City, Missouri. As was common practice, the owners tithed ten percent of the mill's production to the Confederacy. The small community around the mill was unique in Tarrant County in that it prospered throughout the Civil War. "Feild's Freighters", assembled in ox-drawn wagon trains, went as far as Fort Sill, Oklahoma, where a part of the Indian Wars raged in the southern plains in the late 1860s and 1870s.

The prospering community which had grown up around the Man and Feild mill took on the name of "Mansfeild", a combination of the names of the founders. Repeated misspellings over the years resulted in the acceptance of the conventional spelling of "Mansfield." The town was incorporated in 1890, continuing to be a hub for the surrounding farmland.

In 1956, a federal court ordered the Mansfield Independent School District to desegregate, the first such order in Texas. Protests by 300 whites in front of Mansfield High School, to prevent three black students from enrolling, touched off one of the longest-running desegregation battles of the Civil Rights Movement. Mansfield's school quietly desegregated in 1965 as it faced a lack of federal funds.

== Geography ==
According to the United States Census Bureau, the city has a total area of 36.4 square miles (94.3 km^{2}), of which 36.4 square miles (94.2 km^{2}) is land and 0.04 square miles (0.1 km^{2}), or 0.12%, is water.

Climate data for Mansfield, Texas
Month	Jan	Feb	Mar	Apr	May	Jun	Jul	Aug	Sep	Oct	Nov	Dec	Year
Mean daily maximum °F (°C)	56 (13)	60 (16)	67 (19)	76 (24)	82 (28)	89 (32)	94 (34)	95 (35)	88 (31)	77 (25)	66 (19)	57 (14)	76 (24)
Mean daily minimum °F (°C)	33 (1)	37 (3)	44 (7)	52 (11)	61 (16)	69 (21)	72 (22)	72 (22)	65 (18)	54 (12)	44 (7)	35 (2)	53 (12)
Average precipitation inches (mm)	2.07 (53)	2.74 (70)	3.63 (92)	2.79 (71)	4.53 (115)	4.01 (102)	2.42 (61)	2.27 (58)	3.22 (82)	4.30 (109)	2.58 (66)	2.50 (64)	37.06 (943)

== Demographics ==
Historical population
Census	Pop.	Note	%±
1880	249		—
1890	418		67.9%
1900	694		66.0%
1910	627		−9.7%
1920	719		14.7%
1930	635		−11.7%
1940	774		21.9%
1950	964		24.5%
1960	1,375		42.6%
1970	3,658		166.0%
1980	8,102		121.5%
1990	15,607		92.6%
2000	28,031		79.6%
2010	56,368		101.1%
2020	72,602		28.8%
2025 (est.)	84,444		16.3%
U.S. Decennial Census

=== 2020 census ===
As of the 2020 census, Mansfield had a population of 72,602, with a median age of 36.6 years. 27.6% of residents were under the age of 18 and 11.1% of residents were 65 years of age or older. For every 100 females there were 92.3 males, and for every 100 females age 18 and over there were 89.1 males age 18 and over.

98.3% of residents lived in urban areas, while 1.7% lived in rural areas.

There were 24,187 households, including 18,066 families, of which 45.0% had children under the age of 18 living in them. Of all households, 61.0% were married-couple households, 11.5% were households with a male householder and no spouse or partner present, and 22.8% were households with a female householder and no spouse or partner present. About 17.3% of all households were made up of individuals and 6.7% had someone living alone who was 65 years of age or older.

There were 25,204 housing units, of which 4.0% were vacant. The homeowner vacancy rate was 1.2% and the rental vacancy rate was 7.7%.

Racial composition as of the 2020 census
Race	Number	Percent
White	38,666	53.3%
Black or African American	15,822	21.8%
American Indian and Alaska Native	537	0.7%
Asian	4,030	5.6%
Native Hawaiian and Other Pacific Islander	62	0.1%
Some other race	4,690	6.5%
Two or more races	8,795	12.1%
Hispanic or Latino (of any race)	13,424	18.5%
Total	72,602	

=== 2010 census ===
The racial and ethnic composition of the population in 2010 was 64.4% non-Hispanic white, 14.2% black or African American, 0.6% Native American, 1.5% Vietnamese, 2.2% other Asian, 0.1% Pacific Islander, 0.2% non-Hispanic from some other race, 2.8% from two or more races and 15.4% Hispanic or Latino. In 2010, 5,996 of the city's population were foreign-born.

== Economy ==
According to information released by the city government, the largest employers of Mansfield as of 2021 were:

#	Employer	# of Employees
1	Mouser Electronics	2,067
2	Methodist Mansfield Medical Center	1,428
3	Klein Tools	733
4	Hoffman Cabinets	502
5	City of Mansfield TX	485
6	BCB Transport	435
7	R1	183
8	SJ Louis Construction of TX	175
9	Conveyors, Inc	153
10	Universal Air Condition	148
11	Southern Champion Tray	143
12	UTEX Industries	138
13	Mauser Packaging	125
14	Gamma Aerospace	123
15	Trinity Forge	111
16	RJ Carroll	110
17	Sellmark	109
18	Master Meter	108
19	Champion RV	105
20	Ramtech Building	100

== Arts and culture ==
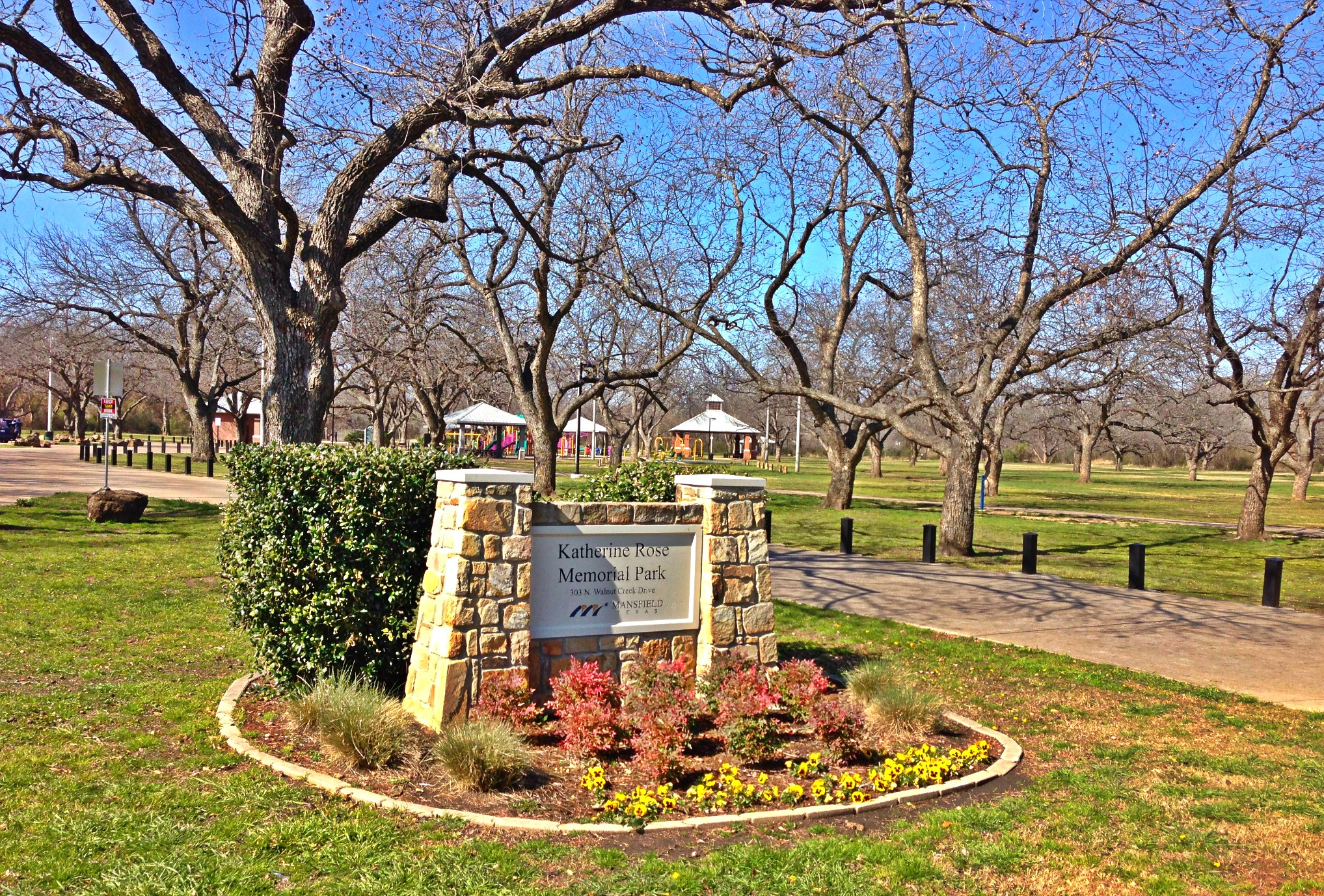
Katherine Rose Park and its pecan groves in late winter

Established in 1917, Farr Best Theater is the city's historical venue for concerts, musical revue and live performances. Even though ownership of the theater has changed hands many times since its inception, the Farr family still resides in Mansfield.

The Mansfield Historical Museum chronicles the city's history from a prairie outpost in the past to a thriving community now.

Hawaiian Falls Water Park is a 10 acres (4.0 ha) destination during the hot summer months; while Historic Mansfield is being revitalized to be a year-round destination. Downtown hosts annual festivals such as the Hot Beats and Cold Brews Festival, the Hometown Holiday Parade and St. Patrick's Day Pickle Parade, due to the BestMaid Pickles companies operations in the city..

Mansfield has an extensive park system including 11 parks, 3.5 mi (5.6 km) of hiking/biking trail, an 80 acres (32 ha) nature park, an activity center, and four athletics fields. Mansfield also has two renowned golf courses: Mansfield National Golf Course and Walnut Creek Country Club.

== Sports ==
North Texas SC relocated from Arlington, Texas, to Mansfield, and will begin playing at Texas Health Mansfield Stadium in July, 2026.

== Education ==
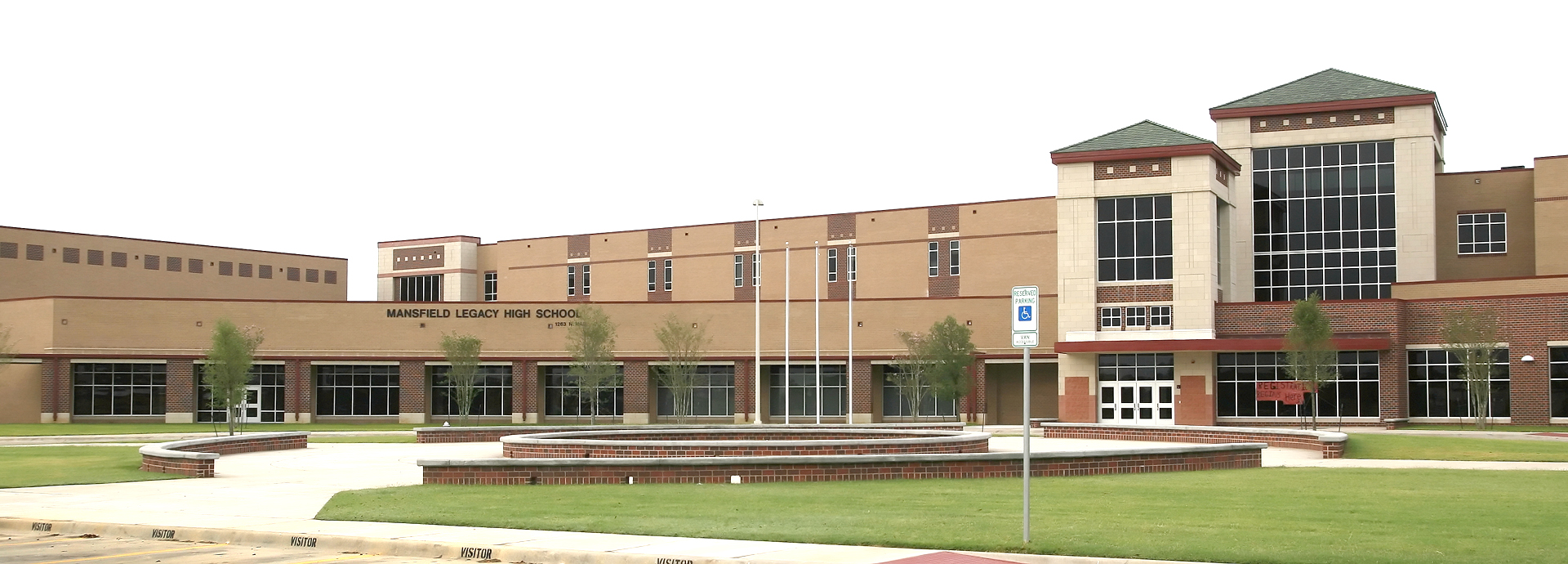
Mansfield Legacy High School

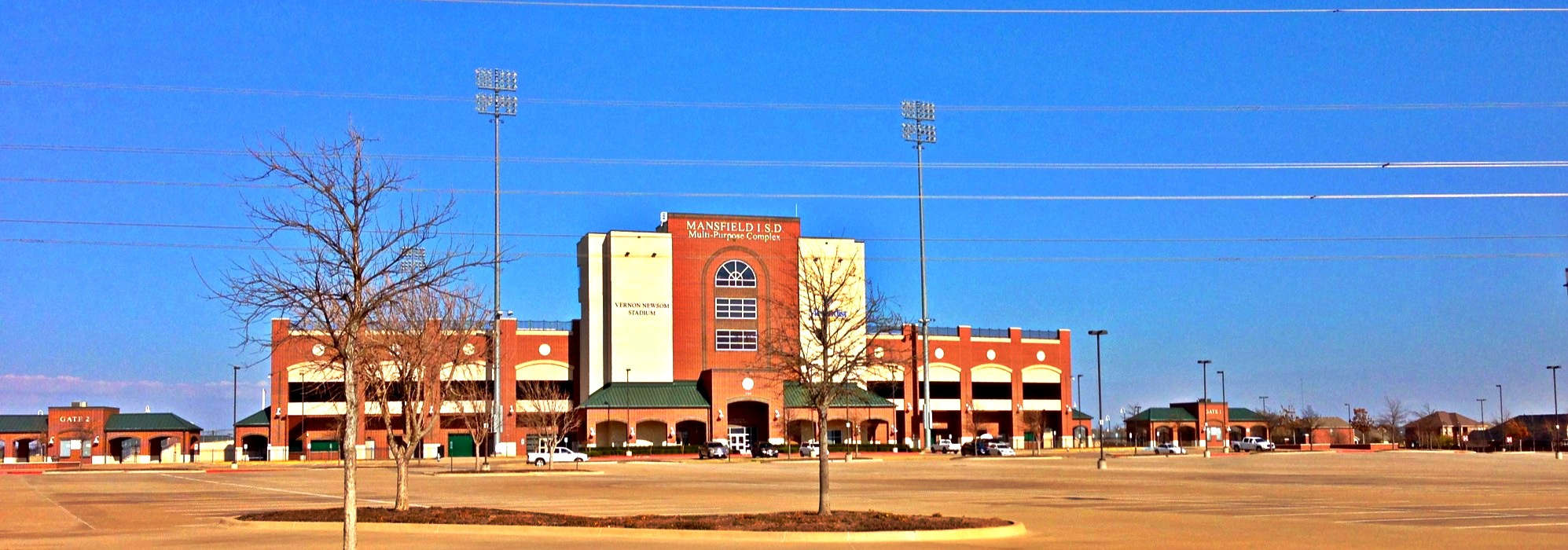
Vernon Newsom Stadium

The Mansfield Independent School District includes all portions of Mansfield in Tarrant and Johnson counties. The portion in Ellis County is zoned to the Midlothian Independent School District.

The high schools in the district are Mansfield High School, Mansfield Summit High School, Mansfield Timberview High School, Mansfield Legacy High School, Frontier High School, Mansfield Lake Ridge High School, Mansfield Early College High School, and the Alternative Education Center consisting of the ACE program and the BIC program. There are 24 elementary schools, seven intermediate schools, and seven middle school and the Jerry Knight STEM Academy (6-8th Grades). The district's athletic facilities are the Vernon Newsom Stadium and MISD Natatorium which make up the MISD Multi-Purpose Athletics Complex and the RL Anderson Football Stadium. The Center for Performing Arts consists of two venues: the 5,500-seat Claude H. Cunningham Performance Hall and the John Washington Professional Development Center.

Tarrant County residents are zoned to Tarrant County College (formerly Tarrant County Junior College). Portions in Ellis County are zoned to Navarro College. Portions in Johnson County are zoned to Hill College.

=== Mansfield school desegregation incident ===
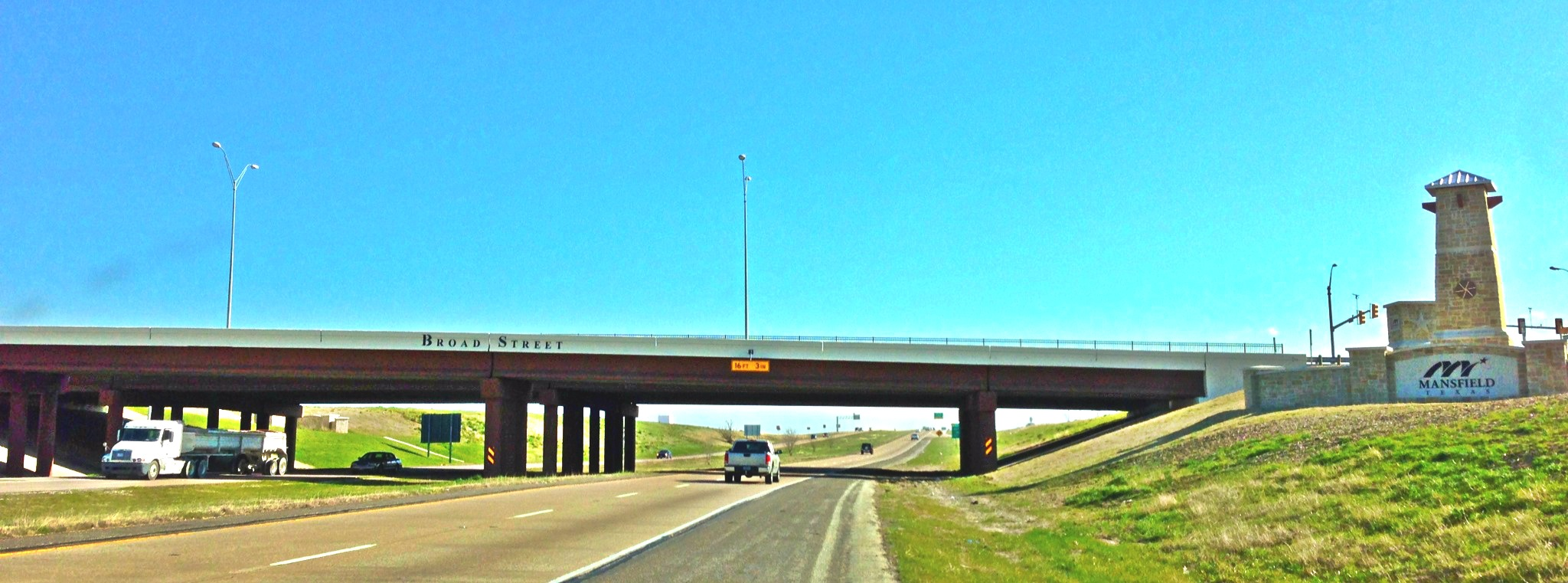
US 287 South at Broad Street

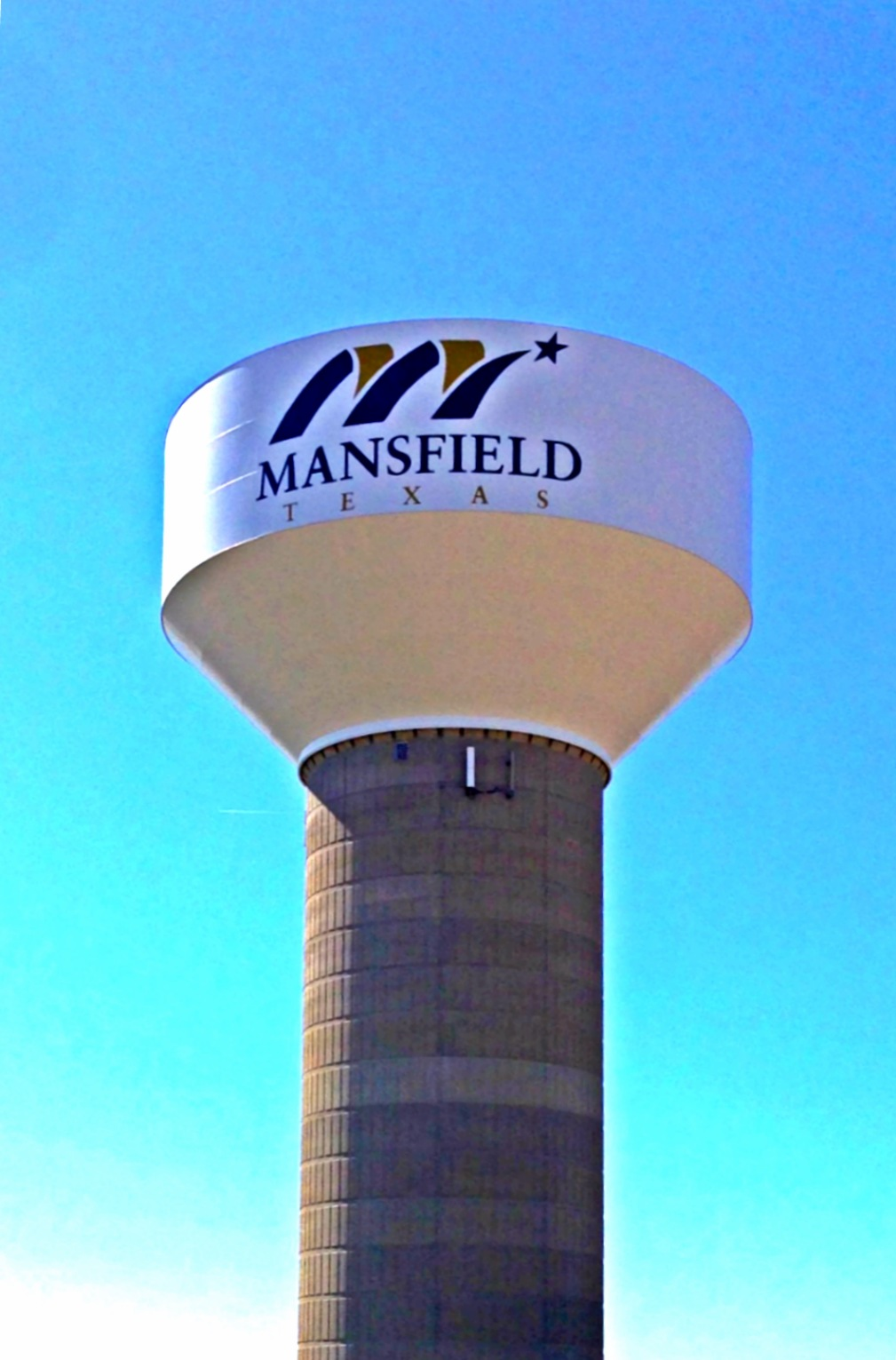
Mansfield water tower

== Infrastructure ==
=== Highways ===
- SH 360
- US 287

=== Healthcare ===
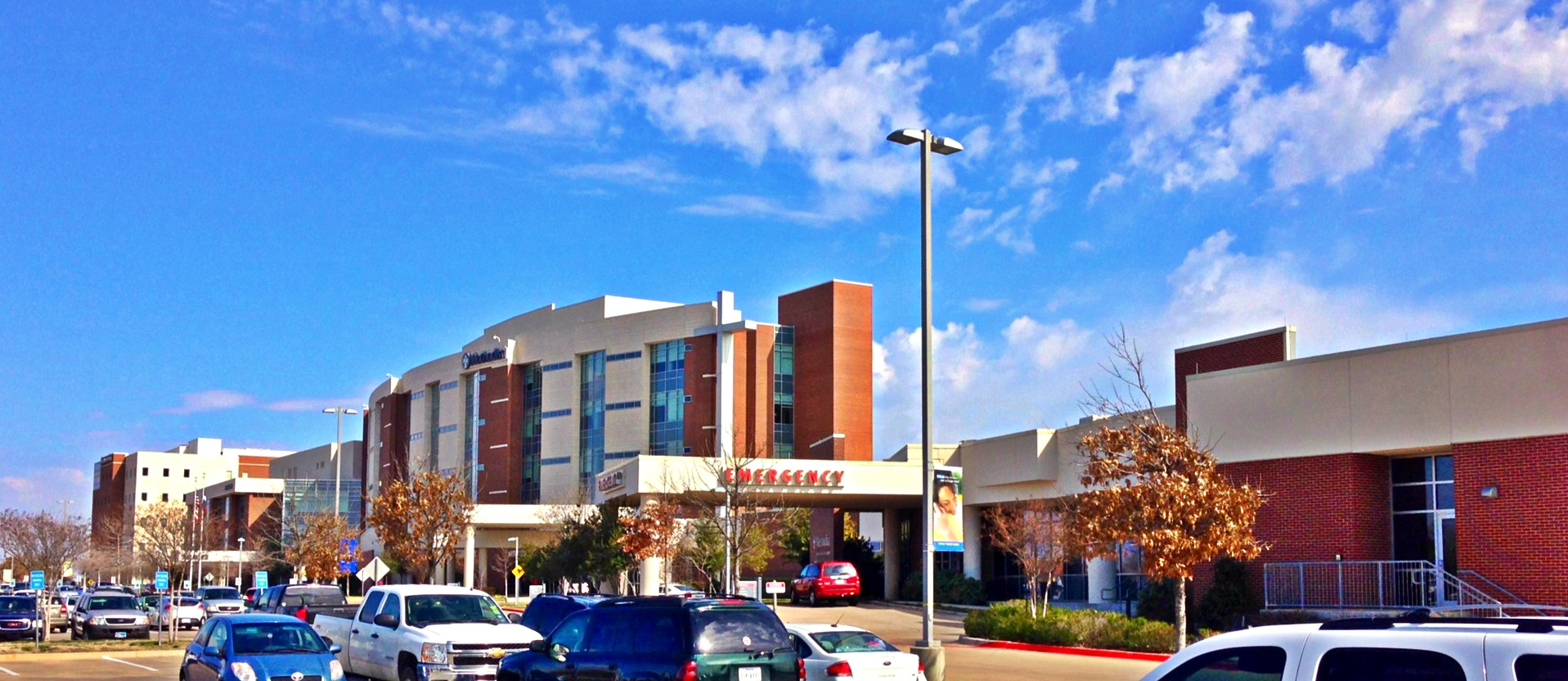
Methodist Mansfield Medical Center

Mansfield has two acute-care hospitals: Methodist Mansfield Medical Center, a 262-bed hospital of the Methodist Health System in Dallas; and Texas Health Hospital Mansfield, which opened on December 1, 2020, it is a joint venture between Texas Health Resources and AdventHealth. Mansfield also has five nursing homes, several urgent care centers, Kindred Hospital—an acute care rehab hospital, Baylor Surgicare at Mansfield—a day surgery center, three assisted living/senior apartments, two Cook Children's clinics and a Cook Children's Specialty Care Facility under construction.

== Sister cities ==
- – Mansfield, Nottinghamshire, England

== Notable people ==
- Paulson Adebo, football player
- Chennedy Carter, WNBA player
- Brandon Bantz, baseball player
- Burley Bearden (1917–1997), football coach
- Tex Bradford (1899–1975), football player and medical doctor
- Kennedy Brooks, football player
- John Anthony Castro, tax consultant
- John Chiles, football player
- David Cook, Republican member of the Texas House of Representatives and former mayor of Mansfield
- Marcus Cromartie, football player
- Josh Doctson, football player
- Troy Dorsey, boxer
- John Howard Griffin (1920–1980), civil rights activist, author of the award-winning book Black Like Me
- Mickey Guyton, country singer
- Chris Harris, politician and attorney
- Sam Hilliard, baseball player
- Adrianne Jones, murder victim
- David Mann, actor and singer
- Tamela Mann, actress and singer
- Drake Milligan, country singer
- Tevin Mitchel, football player
- Ella Mae Morse, pop singer
- Rees Odhiambo, football player
- Lenzy Pipkins, football player
- Hassan Ridgeway, football player
- Quinn Sharp, football player
- John Hall Stephens (1847–1924), U.S. Congressman of Texas
- Noah Syndergaard, baseball player
- Stepfan Taylor, football player
- Jordan Walden, baseball player
- Andrew Wamsley, convicted murderer
- Keith L. Williams, actor
