= Lamar High School (Arlington, Texas) =

Location
- 1400 West Lamar Boulevard; Arlington, Texas 76012; United States; 32°45′50″N 97°07′33″W

Information
- Type: Public School
- Motto: Viking Fight Never Dies! (VFND)
- Established: 1970
- School district: Arlington Independent School District
- Principal: Lesley Maroney
- Teaching staff: 167.39 (FTE)
- Grades: 9-12
- Enrollment: 2,479 (2023–2024)
- Student to teacher ratio: 14.81
- Colors: Blue and Gold
- Athletics: UIL Class 6A (District 3-6A)
- Mascot: Viking
- Nickname: Vikings
- Rival: Arlington High School
- Yearbook: Valhalla
- Website: www.aisd.net/lamar-high-school/

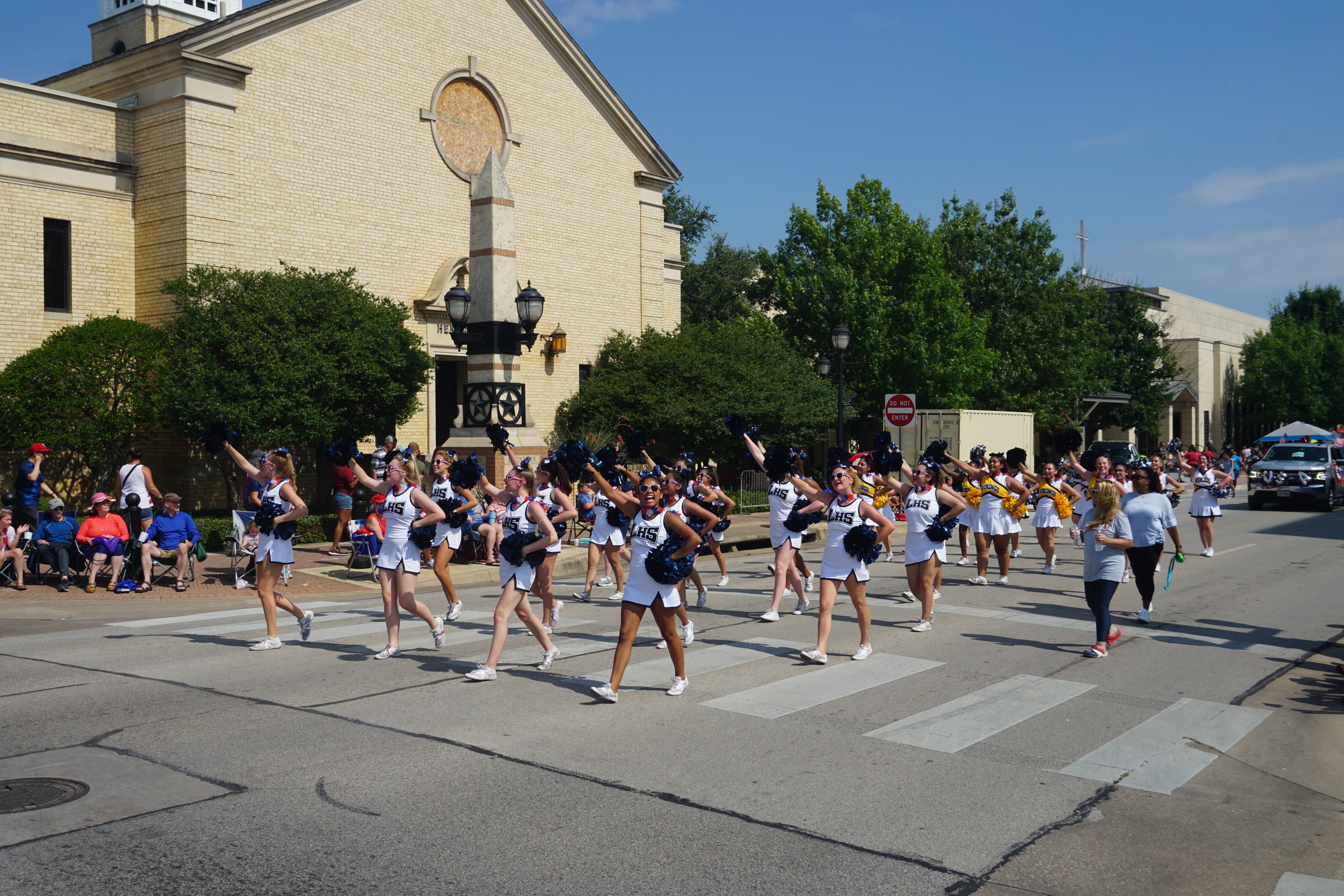
Lamar High School Cheerleaders in the 2021 Arlington Independence Day Parade

Lamar High School is a secondary school in Arlington, Texas. It is named for Mirabeau B. Lamar, the second president of the Republic of Texas, and serves grades 9 through 12 in the Arlington Independent School District.

== History ==
Lamar opened in 1970 as Arlington Independent School District's third high school. Lamar relieved Arlington High School and Sam Houston High School. Cathy Brown of The Dallas Morning News Said that Lamar's effect on Sam Houston was "minimal" because there were very few housing units located north of Division and east of Collins. Brown said that "[t]he effect on Arlington High School was huge" since the housing in the Arlington zone north to Division had been moved to Lamar. 12th-grade students that had been zoned out of Arlington High School continued to attend Arlington High School, despite being in the Lamar zone.

In 1982, Martin High School Opened. Brown said that Sam Houston and Lamar were "relatively unaffected" by the opening of Martin, located in southwest Arlington.

== Feeder patterns ==
Ellis, Larson, Peach, and Sherrod Elementaries feed into Nichols Jr. High. Butler, Pope, Speer, Webb, and Wimbish Elementaries feed into Shackelford Jr. High. Nichols and Shackelford Jr. Highs feed into Lamar.

== Notable alumni ==
- Corinne Bohrer: Film and television actress
- Sean Lowe: Former Bachelor and television personality
- Taylor Cole: Actress, Summerland and numerous other shows
- Corby Davidson: Radio Personality, KTCK 1310 The Ticket
- James Duff: Creator, executive director and head writer of TNT's The Closer
- Fred Jackson: Buffalo Bills running back
- Lauren Lane: Actress, main cast on The Nanny and other productions
- Scott McGarrahan: Former NFL defensive back (1998–2005) for Green Bay Packers, Miami Dolphins, Tennessee Titans, San Diego Chargers and Detroit Lions
- Jeremy Wariner: Gold medalist in 400 meters and 4x400 relay at 2004 Summer Olympics, silver medalist in 400 meters and gold medalist in 4x400 relay at 2008 Summer Olympics
- Mitch Willis: Former NFL defensive lineman (1985–90) for Oakland Raiders, Atlanta Falcons and Dallas Cowboys; played collegiately at SMU
- Billy Miller: Actor, The Young and the Restless, All My Children and General Hospital; 2010 Daytime Emmy award winner, Outstanding Supporting Actor in a Drama Series
- Mark M. Shelton: Texas House of Representatives District 97 (2009–2013), physician at Cook Children's Hospital
- John Rayborn: Former UTEP Quarterback, playing in Canadian Football League and Arena Football League.
- Shane Buechele: Quarterback for the Buffalo Bills
- Perry Minasian: General Manager, Los Angeles Angels, MLB
- Bobby Brown III: NFL defensive lineman, currently with the Los Angeles Rams
- Kyron Johnson: Linebacker for the Philadelphia Eagles
- Isaiah Neyor: College football player for the Texas Longhorns
- Nicholas Lira: Founder of ProScoop. First undergraduate in Fermilab history to have research presented at the American Physical Society’s Division of Particles and Fields annual summer meeting. Inventor, researcher, and entrepreneur.
