= World premieres at Carnegie Hall =

The following is a list of musical works which received their premieres at Carnegie Hall:

- Symphony No. 9, opus 95, "From the New World" by Antonín Dvořák – December 16, 1893, New York Philharmonic, Anton Seidl conducting
- Sinfonia Domestica by Richard Strauss – March 21, 1904, Wetzler Symphony Orchestra, Richard Strauss conducting
- Israel Symphony by Ernest Bloch – May 13, 1917, Ernest Bloch conducting
- Schelomo by Ernest Bloch – May 13, 1917, Hans Kindler cello, Artur Bodanzky conducting
- The Garden of Mystery by Charles Wakefield Cadman – March 20, 1925, Howard Barlow, conducting
- Concerto in F by George Gershwin – December 3, 1925, New York Symphony Orchestra, George Gershwin, piano, Walter Damrosch conducting
- An American in Paris by George Gershwin – December 13, 1928, New York Philharmonic, Walter Damrosch conducting
- Music for a Scene from Shelley, Op. 7, by Samuel Barber – March 24, 1935, New York Philharmonic, Werner Janssen conducting
- Density 21.5 by Edgard Varèse – February 16, 1936, Georges Barrère, flute
- Contrasts by Béla Bartók – January 9, 1939, Benny Goodman, clarinet, Joseph Szigeti, violin, and Endre Petri, piano
- Piano Concerto in B-flat by Arthur Bliss – June 10, 1939, Solomon, New York Philharmonic, Sir Adrian Boult conducting
- Chamber Symphony No. 2 op. 38 by Arnold Schoenberg – December 15, 1940, New Friends of Music, Fritz Stiedry conducting
- Violin Concerto by Benjamin Britten – March 28, 1940, New York Philharmonic, Antonio Brosa, violin, John Barbirolli conducting
- Sinfonia da Requiem by Benjamin Britten – March 29, 1941, New York Philharmonic, John Barbirolli conducting
- New World A-Comin' by Duke Ellington – December 11, 1943, Duke Ellington and His Orchestra
- Symphonic Metamorphosis of Themes by Carl Maria von Weber by Paul Hindemith – January 20, 1944, New York Philharmonic, Artur Rodziński conducting
- Orchestral suite from the ballet, Appalachian Spring by Aaron Copland – October 4, 1944, New York Philharmonic, Artur Rodziński conducting
- Ode to Napoleon Buonaparte for Voice and Piano Quintet, op. 41 by Arnold Schoenberg – November 23, 1944, New York Philharmonic, Artur Rodziński conducting
- A Stopwatch and an Ordnance Map (revised version with brass) by Samuel Barber – December 17, 1945, Collegiate Chorale, Robert Shaw conducting
- Symphony in Three Movements by Igor Stravinsky – January 24, 1946, New York Philharmonic, Igor Stravinsky conducting
- Ebony Concerto by Igor Stravinsky – March 25, 1946, Woody Herman and His Orchestra, Walter Hendl conducting
- Symphony No. 3, "The Camp Meeting" by Charles Ives – April 5, 1946, New York Little Symphony, Lou Harrison conducting, in Carnegie Chamber Music Hall (now known as Weill Recital Hall)
- Hymne pour grande orchestra (Hymne au Saint Sacrament) by Olivier Messiaen – March 13, 1947, New York Philharmonic, Leopold Stokowski conducting
- Excursions (first performance of the complete set) by Samuel Barber – November 21, 1947, Nadia Reisenberg, piano
- Symphony No. 2 by Charles Ives – February 22, 1951, New York Philharmonic, Leonard Bernstein conducting
- Medea's Dance of Vengeance by Samuel Barber – February 2, 1956, New York Philharmonic, Dimitri Mitropoulos conducting
- Overture to Candide by Leonard Bernstein – January 26, 1957, New York Philharmonic, Leonard Bernstein conducting
- Intermezzo from Vanessa by Samuel Barber – March 15, 1958, New York Philharmonic, Andre Kostelanetz conducting
- Symphonic Dances from West Side Story by Leonard Bernstein – February 13, 1961, New York Philharmonic, Lukas Foss conducting
- Symphony No. 4 by Charles Ives – April 26, 1965, American Symphony Orchestra, Leopold Stokowski conducting
- Mutations from Bach by Samuel Barber – October 7, 1968, American Symphony Orchestra, Leopold Stokowski conducting
- Evocations for Orchestra by Carl Ruggles – February 2, 1971, National Orchestral Association, John Perras conducting
- Concerto for Oboe and Orchestra by John Corigliano – November 9, 1975, American Symphony Orchestra, Bert Lucarelli, oboe, Akiyama Kazuyoshi conducting
- Piano Concerto No. 1 by Milton Babbitt – January 19, 1986, American Composers Orchestra, Alan Feinberg, piano, Charles Wuorinen conducting
- Opening Prayer by Leonard Bernstein – December 15, 1986, New York Philharmonic, conducted by the composer on the opening night of the restored hall
- Gloria by Randol Alan Bass - 1990, New York Pops, Skitch Henderson conducting
- Concerto No. 1 by Gregory Magarshak – 1991, Manhattan Symphony Orchestra, Peter Tiboris conducting
- "The Face in the Lake" original composition by Patrick Doyle – February, 1998
- Symphony No. 6 "Plutonian Ode" for soprano and orchestra by Philip Glass, text by Allen Ginsberg – February 3, 2002, American Composers Orchestra, Lauren Flanigan, soprano, Dennis Russell Davies conducting
- American Berserk by John Coolidge Adams – February 25, 2002, Garrick Ohlsson, piano
- Symphony of Psalms by Imant Raminsh – 2002, Candace Wicke conducting
- Women at an Exhibition for chamber orchestra, electronics, and video by Randall Woolf – November 17, 2004, American Composers Orchestra, Steven Sloane conducting, video by Mary Harron and John C. Walsh
- Between Hills Briefly Green performed by Vermont Youth Orchestra. Conducted by Troy Peters. September 2004
- Algunas metáforas que aluden al tormento, a la angustia y a la Guerra for percussion quartet and chamber orchestra by Carlos Carrillo – January 21, 2005, American Composers Orchestra and So Percussion, Steven Sloane conducting
- Traps Relaxed by Dan Trueman – January 21, 2005, American Composers Orchestra, Dan Trueman, electronic violin and laptop, Steven Sloane conducting
- Glimmer by Jason Freeman – January 21, 2005, American Composers Orchestra, Steven Sloane conducting
- Concerto for Winds "Some Other Blues" by Daniel Schnyder – February 8, 2005, Orpheus Chamber Orchestra
- Introit and Epilogue by Mack Wilberg – March 14, 2006, Box Elder High School Concert Choir, Haslett High School Chorale, Martin High School Chorale (Carnegie Hall National High School Choral Festival Choirs), Craig Jessop conducting
- Requiem by Steven Edwards – November 20, 2006
- Catenaires by Elliott Carter – December 11, 2006, Pierre-Laurent Aimard, piano (composer present at premiere)
- Antworte by TaQ – March 11, 2007, New York Symphonic Ensemble, Mamoru Takahara conducting
- Wolf Rounds by Christopher Rouse – March 29, 2007, University of Miami-Frost Wind Ensemble
- Concerto for Cello and Orchestra by Thomas Sleeper – March 23, 2008, Florida Youth Orchestra, Thomas Sleeper conducting, Jillian Bloom, cello
- The Undeterred by Scott R. Munson – November 18, 2007, piano (Dong Gyun Ham), musical saw (Natalia Paruz) and baritone (Byung Woo Kim)
- Violin Concertino by Clint Needham – December 9, 2007, New York Youth Symphony, Ryan McAdams conducting, William R. Harvey, violin
- Rain, River, Sea by Dr. Patrick Long – March 7, 2008, Susquehanna University Masterworks Chorus and Orchestra, Dr. Jennifer Sacher-Wiley conducting, Nina Tober, soprano, David Steinau, baritone
- Eureka! by Patrick J. Burns – March 24, 2008, Westlake High School Wind Ensemble, Mr. Brian Peter conductor.
- Incline by Matt McBane – March 24, 2008, Westlake High School Chamber Orchestra, Mrs. Elizabeth Blake conductor.
- Hit the Ground Running by Gordon Goodwin – March 24, 2008, Westlake High School Studio Jazz, Mr. Brian Peter conducting, Gordon Goodwin, tenor saxophone
- The Five Changes by Gregory Youtz – June 1, 2008, Oregon State University Wind Ensemble, Dr. Christopher Chapman conducting, Robert Brudvig, percussion
- The Phoenix Rising by Stella Sung – June 15, 2008, performed by the Florida Festival Youth Orchestra, conducted by Jonathan May.
- Alligator Songs by Daniel May – June 15, 2008, performed by the Florida Festival Youth Orchestra, conducted by Jonathan May.
- The Ponce De Leon Suite by Robert Kerr – June 15, 2008, performed by the Florida Festival Youth Orchestra, conducted by Jonathan May.
- Symphony No. 5 (Concerto for Orchestra) by Ellen Taaffe Zwilich – October 27, 2008, performed by The Juilliard Orchestra conducted by James Conlon
- "Skyward" by Adam Wolf – June 16, 2009, performed by Eastlake High School led by Charles Wolf
- "An American Christmas Carol" – December 2, 2010 – Tim Janis
- Pilgrim Soul by Augusta Read Thomas – February 10, 2011, performed by Alyssa Kuhn, violin, Julieta Mihai, violin, Matthew Kuhn, cor anglais, Michael Barta, conducting
- Sufi Music Ensemble May 21, 2011, Performed by Steve Gorn, Hidayat Khan and Samir Chatterjee organized by the South Asian Music and Arts Association (SAMAA) in honor of Vilayat Khan.
- "Dies Irae" by Gabriel Smallwood – February 5, 2012 – Choirs from Forest Hills High School, Fort Hamilton High School, and Scarsdale High School; and The Orchestra of St. Luke's
- "A Man's Life" by Thomas Reeves – February 5, 2012 – Choirs from Forest Hills High School, Fort Hamilton High School, and Scarsdale High School; and The Orchestra of St. Luke's
- "Thus it was" by Anthony Constantino – February 5, 2012 – Choirs from Forest Hills High School, Fort Hamilton High School, and Scarsdale High School; and The Orchestra of St. Luke's
- After the Dazzle of Day by Corey Rubin – February 7, 2014, performed by the Duxbury High School Wind Ensemble, String Ensemble, and Chamber Singers, Jeffrey Grogan conducting
- The Drop that Contained the Sea by Christopher Tin – April 13, 2014, performed by the DCINY Singers and Orchestra, Dr. Jonathan Griffith, conductor
- Spirits Rising: The Texan Rider by Charles Fernandez – April 23, 2014, performed by the Tarleton State University Wind Ensemble, Dr. Anthony Pursell, conductor
- Psalm 92 by Anthony LaBounty – November 25, 2014, performed by the Foothill High School Wind Symphony, Mr. Travis Pardee, director, Foothill High School (Henderson, Nevada)
- "Trionfante in D Minor for String Orchestra" original composition by Benjamin Eidt – March 16, 2015, performed by the Athens High School Philharmonic Orchestra, Mrs. Claire Murphy conducting
- Firing On All Cylinders by Matt Conaway, performed by the Purdue University Wind Ensemble on March 29, 2016
- March of Defiance by Michael D Blostein, performed by the Averill Park High School Symphonic Orchestra on June 13, 2016
- "Kaku, kupala| Fear in Neutral Buoyancy" original orchestral composition by Sean J. Kennedy – September 27, 2015, performed by Youth Philharmonic International Orchestra, conducted by Jose Luis Gomez
- "Unsung Hero" original composition by Kavon Emtiaz – June 14, 2016, performed by the Denver Young Artists Orchestra, conducted by Wes Kenney
- "Ain't-a That Good News" medley of traditional spirituals by Sally K. Albrecht- June 25, 2016, performed by WorldStrides Middle School Honors Junior Choir, conducted by Sally Albrecht
- "I'm Bound for Glory!" by Sally K. Albrecht - June 23, 2018, performed by WorldStrides Middle School Honors Junior Choir, conducted by Sally Albrecht
- Openings by Alec Schumacker - April 11, 2023, performed by EVHS String Orchestra, conducted by Maritza Spieller
- ”Fanfare for Unity” by Jorge Machain - April 28, 2024, performed by Ed W. Clark High School Concert Band (Las Vegas, Nevada), conducted by Jeff Lacoff
