= Pylon Field =

- IATA: none; ICAO: none

Summary
- Opened: 1960
- Closed: 1975
- Elevation AMSL: 610 ft / 186 m
- Coordinates: 32°41′16″N 97°10′48″W
- Interactive map of Pylon Field

Runways
Direction	Length		Surface
Direction	ft	m	Surface
17/35	1,800	549	Sod

Pylon Field was a small airport located in southwest Arlington, Texas, United States. It was originally built in 1960. The airport had a single 1,800-foot unpaved runway.

In 1973, the airport was sold to Arlington ISD, who gave the owners two years to close the airport. The airport was closed in 1975.

The airport housed and sold airplanes, most of which belonging to "new owners" who look lessons and purchased their planes at the airport.

The former location of the airport runway is now the parking lot for the baseball fields at Martin High School in Arlington.

After the airport closed, and before Martin High School took over, the field was used for soccer events.

== Accidents and incidents ==
- August 28, 1965: A plane taking off from the field's left wing tore off in an emergency landing after a motor stall. The pilot walked away unharmed.
- December 20, 1965: An agricultural pilot doing acrobatics over the field crashed. The pilot, Thomas F. Russell, was killed in the crash.
- January 14, 1968: A pilot during plane contest failed to recover from a tight turn and crashed. The pilot, Johnny Lee Aitken, was killed, and the passenger was critically injured.
