= Arlington High School (Texas) =

Coordinates: 32.719742°N 97.118248°W

Location
- 818 West Park Row Drive; Arlington, Tarrant County, Texas 76013; United States

Information
- Type: Public
- Motto: "How sweet it is to be in Colt Country."
- Established: 1904
- School district: Arlington Independent School District
- Principal: Stacie Humbles
- Teaching staff: 160.87 (FTE)
- Grades: 9-12
- Enrollment: 2,501 (2023–2024)
- Student to teacher ratio: 15.55
- Colors: Kelly green & White
- Athletics conference: UIL District 8-6A
- Mascot: Arlie the Colt
- Nickname: Colts
- Rival: Martin High School
- Accreditation: Texas Education Agency
- Newspaper: The Colt
- Yearbook: The Corral
- Website: Official website

Arlington High School (AHS), located in Arlington, Texas, United States, is a secondary school serving grades 9–12. It is one of the six high schools comprising the Arlington Independent School District.

AHS has approximately 2,700 students, and are residents of Arlington, Dalworthington Gardens, and Pantego. Arlington High School has been accepted as an International Baccalaureate World School.

== History ==
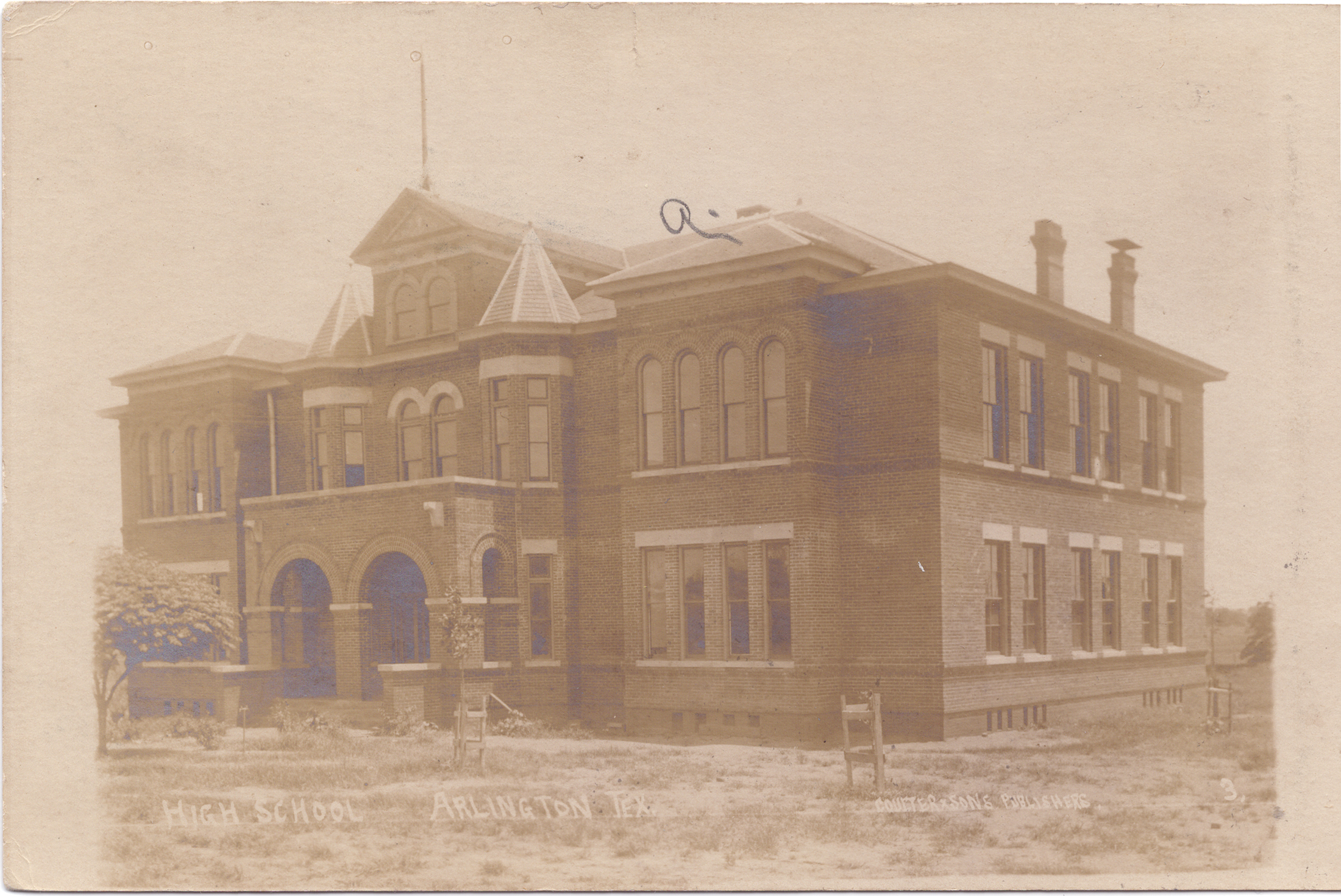
Postcard of Arlington High School, 1907

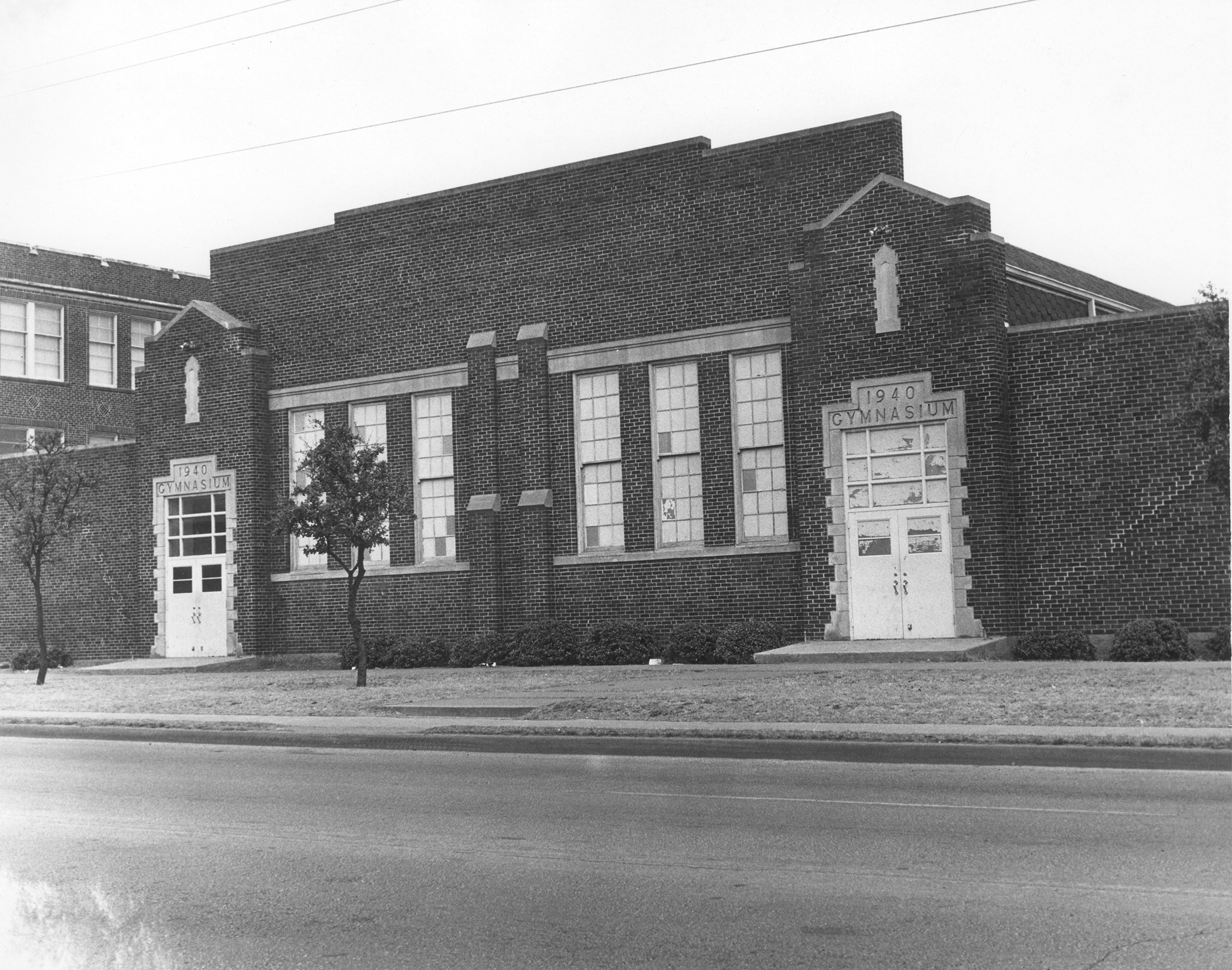
Old Arlington High School gymnasium, built in 1940

- 1903: The local schools were taken over by the city of Arlington from Carlisle Military Academy.
- 1905: First graduating class of the High School made up of five girls.
- 1908: First graduating class with boys.
- 1922: Arlington High School built on Cooper St. and Abram St., separating grades 8 – 11 from first through seventh grades.
- 1951: Arlington High defeats Waco La Vega for the Class AA State Championship title.
- 1956: Last class to graduate from AHS on Cooper St. and Abram St. AHS opens on Park Row Dr.
- 1965: AISD desegregated, so Arlington High School desegregated.
- 1988-89: Colts Junior Varsity and Varsity both go undefeated in regular season.
- 2025: The school opened an addition called the "Cube" which include new classrooms, a new open-concept library, a new band hall, a new orchestra room, art rooms, gallery space, a black box theater and more.

== Feeder patterns ==
The following elementary schools feed into Arlington High School:

- Duff Elementary (feeds into Bailey)
- Hill Elementary (feeds into Bailey)
- Swift Elementary (feeds into Bailey)
- South Davis Elementary (feeds into Bailey)
- Dunn Elementary (partially feeds into Bailey; rest sent to Young)
- Corey Academy (feeds into Gunn)
- Foster Elementary (feeds into Gunn)
- Jones Academy (feeds into Gunn)
- Key Elementary (feeds into Gunn)
- Short Elementary (feeds into Gunn)
- Blanton Elementary (feeds into Rodriguez)

The following middle schools feed into Arlington High School:

- Bailey Junior High
- Gunn Junior High (majority feeder; rest sent to Bowie)
- Rodriguez Junior High (formerly Carter Jr. High; partial feeder with rest going to Sam Houston)

== Notable alumni ==
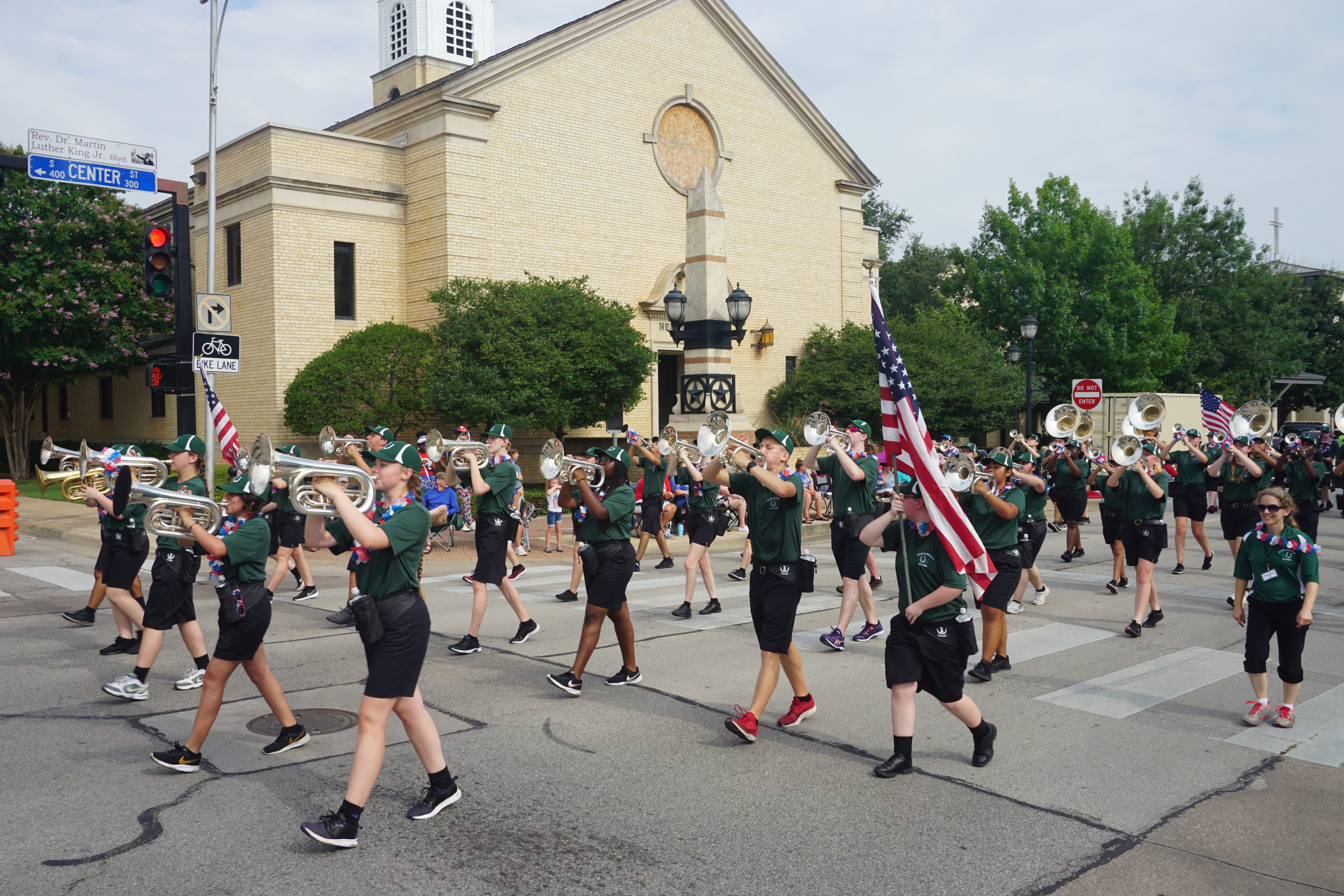
The Arlington High School Band in the 2021 Arlington Independence Day Parade

- Darrell Lance Abbott, '85, also known as "Diamond Darrell", "Dimebag Darrell", "Dimebag" or simply "Dime", of Hard-Rock Band Pantera.
- Tervel Dlagnev, '03, Freestyle wrestler in the 2012 Summer Olympics
- Ali Haji-Sheikh, '79, collegiate and professional placekicker; member of 1984 NFC Pro Bowl team.
- Chris Harris, '66, Texas State Senator
- Rita Inos, '72, Educator and politician in the Northern Mariana Islands, first female candidate for Lieutenant Governor
- Luke Joeckel, '10, professional football player for the NFL’s Jacksonville Jaguars
- Neel E. Kearby '28 U.S. Army Air Corps Colonel in World War II; P-47 Thunderbolt pilot who received the Medal of Honor for his actions in combat.
- V'Keon Lacey, '06, football player
- Chris Martin, '04, professional baseball player
- Rogelio Funes Mori, '09, Professional Soccer Player for Mexican Club Monterrey
- Hunter Pence, '01, Former Major League Baseball All-Star right fielder (Houston Astros, San Francisco Giants, and Texas Rangers)
- Gretchen Polhemus, '83, Miss USA 1989, 2nd runner up Miss Universe 1990
- Amy N. Stewart, '87, author of From the Ground Up, Flower Confidential, Wicked Plants, and other books.
- Morgan Woodward, '44, film and TV actor. Best known for his recurring role in Dallas as Marvin "Punk" Anderson.
- Chris Naggar, '16, football player
