= Dalworthington Gardens, Texas =

Dalworthington, Texas
- City
- City of Dalworthington Gardens
- Motto: "A rural oasis in the heart of the metroplex"
- Location of Dalworthington Gardens in Tarrant County, Texas
- Coordinates: 32°41′37″N 97°9′24″W
- Country: United States
- State: Texas
- County: Tarrant
- Established: 1934

Area
  - Total: 1.82 sq mi (4.72 km^{2})
  - Land: 1.79 sq mi (4.63 km^{2})
  - Water: 0.035 sq mi (0.09 km^{2}) 1.95%
- Elevation: 574 ft (175 m)

Population (2020)
  - Total: 2,293
  - Density: 1,282.4/sq mi (495.15/km^{2})
- Time zone: UTC-6 (CST)
  - Summer (DST): UTC-5 (CDT)
- FIPS code: 48-19084
- GNIS feature ID: 2410290
- Website: http://www.cityofdwg.net/

Dalworthington Gardens is a city in Tarrant County, Texas, United States and a suburb of Arlington.

As of the 2020 census, Dalworthington Gardens had a population of 2,293.

== History ==
The community was established in 1934 as a subsistence homestead project during the Great Depression under the authority of the National Industrial Recovery Act as part of the Subsistence Homesteads Division. The purpose of the homestead program was to help families attain a better standard of living through a combination of part-time industrial employment and subsistence agriculture. Dalworthington Gardens was one of five such projects located in Texas. Its inclusion in the group was at the suggestion of Eleanor Roosevelt, who happened upon the area while visiting the Fort Worth family of the woman to whom the son of her and President Roosevelt, Elliot, had become engaged. Of the five sites selected for this program, Dalworthington "colony" as it was originally called, is the only one still in existence today. Since it has been in constant operation from its inception, it maintains its original zoning regulations, which allow subsistence farming and livestock on any lots over one-half acre that remain owned and occupied from the time the zoning was first put into effect. Thus, one can see small, older frame homes with livestock on their lot, near and even adjacent to large modern homes with values in excess of $1 million. The community's name is a portmanteau of the names of the three anchor cities of the metroplex: Dallas, Fort Worth, and Arlington.

== Geography ==
According to the United States Census Bureau, the city has a total area of 1.8 square miles (4.7 km^{2}), of which 0.04 square miles (0.1 km^{2}), or 1.95%, is covered by water.

The town's northern border adjoins Pantego; both towns are completely surrounded by the city of Arlington.

== Demographics ==
Historical population
Census	Pop.	Note	%±
1950	267		—
1960	430		61.0%
1970	757		76.0%
1980	1,100		45.3%
1990	1,758		59.8%
2000	2,186		24.3%
2010	2,259		3.3%
2020	2,293		1.5%
2021 (est.)	2,273		−0.9%
U.S. Decennial Census

=== 2020 census ===
As of the 2020 census, Dalworthington Gardens had a population of 2,293. The median age was 48.8 years. 19.3% of residents were under the age of 18 and 23.2% of residents were 65 years of age or older. For every 100 females there were 103.5 males, and for every 100 females age 18 and over there were 100.3 males age 18 and over.

100.0% of residents lived in urban areas, while 0.0% lived in rural areas.

There were 835 households in Dalworthington Gardens, of which 31.6% had children under the age of 18 living in them. Of all households, 69.6% were married-couple households, 10.9% were households with a male householder and no spouse or partner present, and 15.0% were households with a female householder and no spouse or partner present. About 12.8% of all households were made up of individuals and 7.2% had someone living alone who was 65 years of age or older.

There were 873 housing units, of which 4.4% were vacant. The homeowner vacancy rate was 1.0% and the rental vacancy rate was 6.4%.

Racial composition as of the 2020 census
Race	Number	Percent
White	1,672	72.9%
Black or African American	205	8.9%
American Indian and Alaska Native	9	0.4%
Asian	136	5.9%
Native Hawaiian and Other Pacific Islander	3	0.1%
Some other race	54	2.4%
Two or more races	214	9.3%
Hispanic or Latino (of any race)	229	10.0%

=== 2010 census ===
As of the 2010 census, 2,259 people resided in the city.

== Politics ==
Dalworthington Gardens is a largely Republican jurisdiction in modern times, having supported the GOP in the last six presidential elections, and the last seven Texas gubernatorial elections.

Dalworthington Gardens city vote by party in presidential elections
Year	Democratic	Republican	Third Parties
2020	32.96% 467	67.04% 950	0.00% 0
2016	26.32% 348	68.91% 911	4.77% 63
2012	22.48% 305	75.76% 1,028	1.77% 24
2008	25.09% 352	73.98% 1,038	0.93% 13
2004	21.58% 311	77.10% 1,111	1.32% 19
2000	22.66% 261	73.96% 852	3.39% 39

Dalworthington Gardens city vote by party in gubernatorial elections
Year	Democratic	Republican	Third Parties
2022	31.61% 378	67.39% 806	1.00% 12
2018	23.52% 294	75.28% 941	1.20% 15
2014	24.46% 236	74.61% 720	0.93% 9
2010	22.05% 204	74.16% 686	3.78% 35
2006	19.83% 190	51.36% 492	28.81% 276
2002	24.34% 223	74.34% 681	5.32% 12
1998	17.69% 133	81.38% 612	0.93% 7

== Education ==
=== Public education ===
Dalworthington Gardens lies within the Arlington Independent School District. Dalworthington Gardens is served by Key Elementary School, Gunn Junior High School, Martin High School, and Arlington High School.

In Texas, school district boundaries do not always follow city and county boundaries because all aspects of the school district government apparatus, including school district boundaries, are independent from the city and county government. In the case of Dalworthington Gardens, no independent school district was ever established. The proximity of the already established Arlington ISD led to the entirety of Dalworthington Gardens being served by the AISD since the middle of the 20th century.

=== Colleges and universities ===
No colleges or universities are located in this community, but the town lies in proximity to the University of Texas at Arlington. The community is also served by the Tarrant County College district of junior colleges, which has campuses located in some surrounding cities.
