= Siegfried Buchenau =

German merchant

Carl Ludwig Siegfried Buchenau (born 30 November 1870 in Bremen; died 16 September 1932) was a German merchant, landlord and art collector in the early 20th century.

== Early life ==
Siegfried Buchenau was the fourth child of the Bremen botanist and educator Franz Georg Philipp Buchenau and his wife Margarethe Auguste, née Adami (d. 1905). The numismatist Heinrich Buchenau was his oldest brother.

He went to Mexico, married Anna Emilie, née Vermehren, whose father was the Vice Consul of the German Empire in Torreon, Julius (Julio) A. Vermehren.

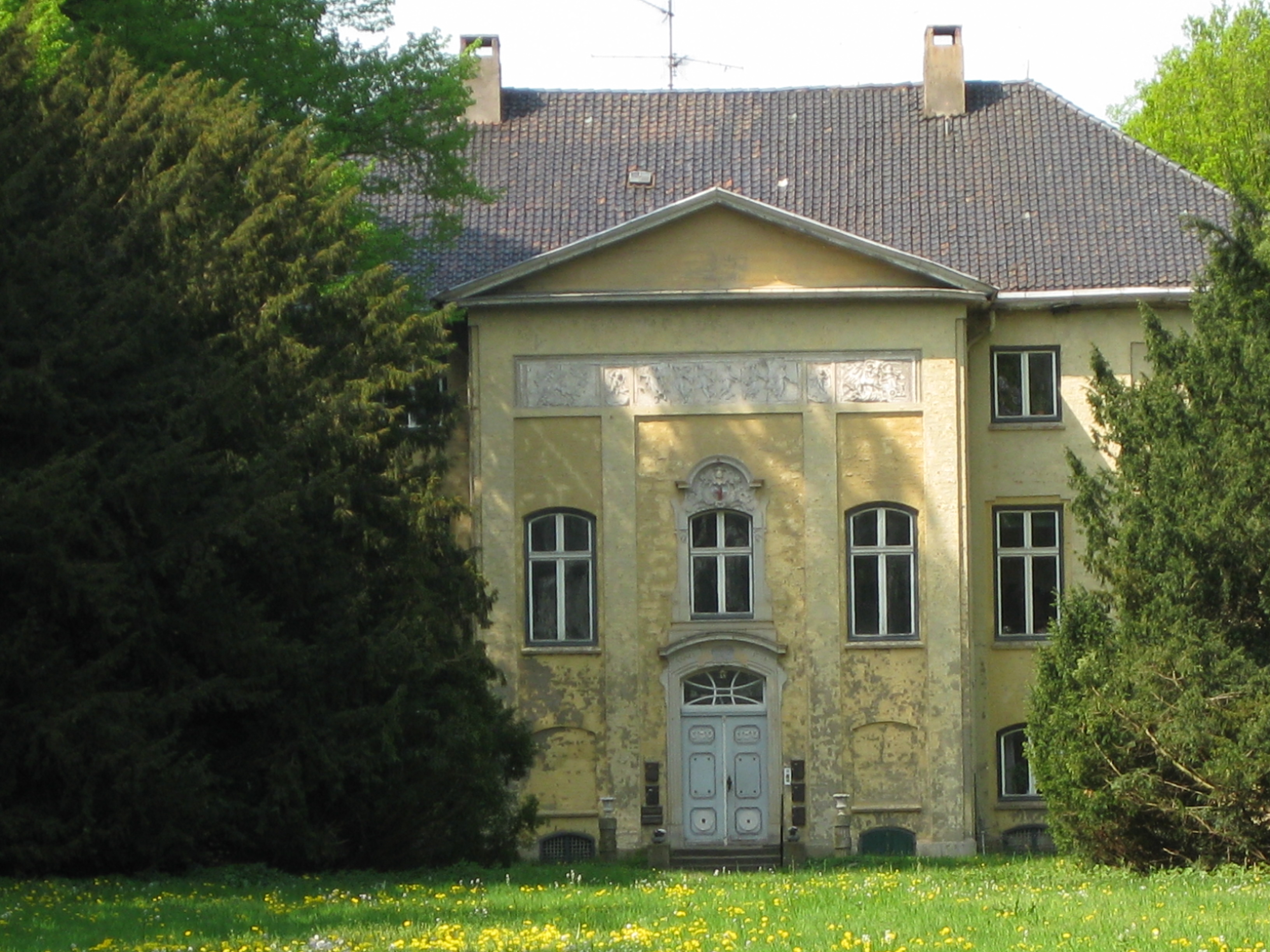
Classicist mansion of the Niendorf estate (2009)

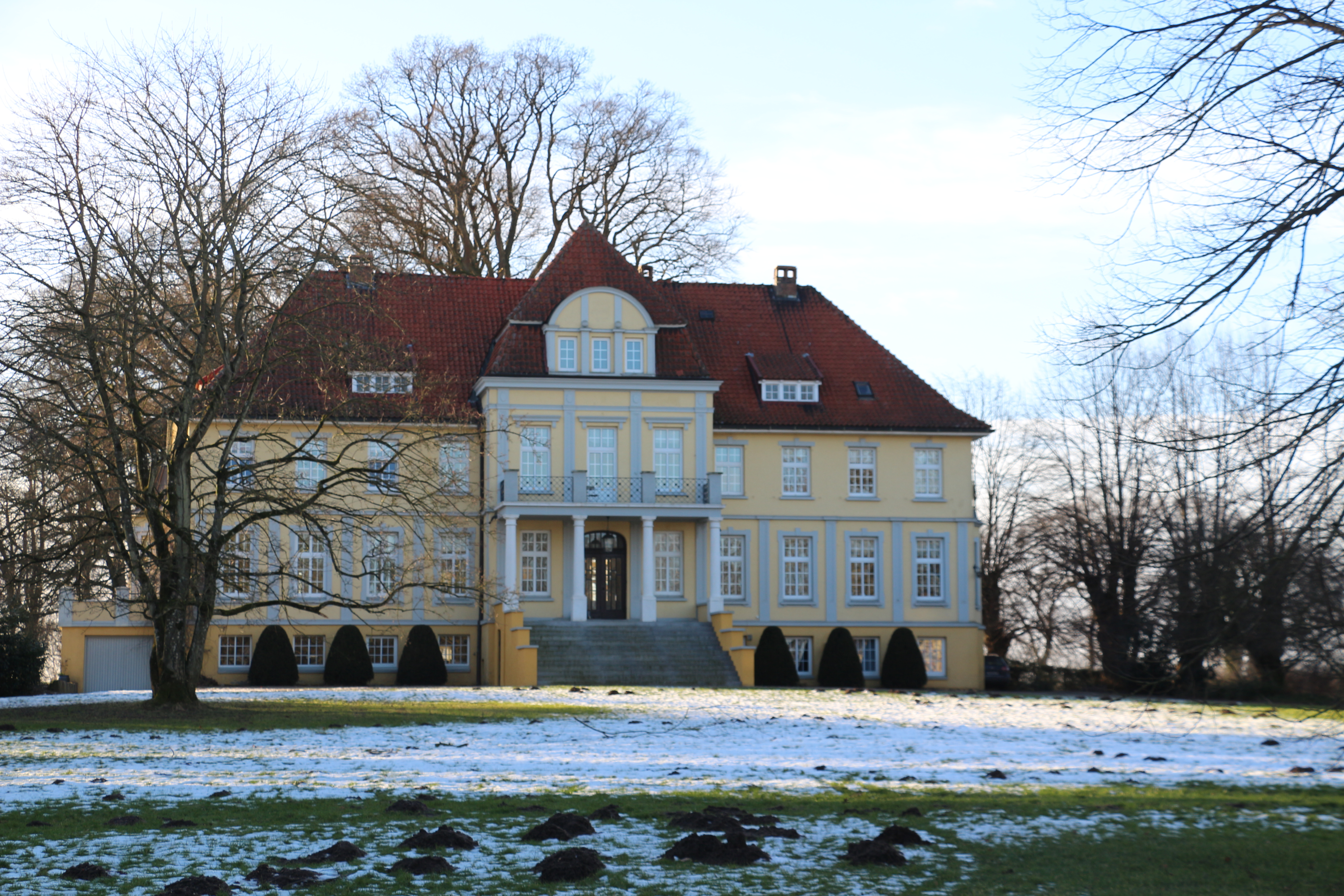
Warleberg manor

On 1 May 1913 Buchenau leased the manor house Niendorf along with the hunting grounds (Gut Weißenrode) from the city of Lübeck, where he resided until his death. In 1920 he acquired the Warleberg estate in Neuwittenbek, which is still managed by his descendants to this day.

The couple's guests at Niendorf included the conductor and composer Hermann Hans Wetzler, who completed his Symphonic Fantasy for Orchestra, Op. 10 here in 1922, gave it the title Weissenrode and dedicated it to Anna and Siegfried Buchenau.

== Art Collection ==
Buchenau was an important art collector and patron. He was one of the founders of the Overbeck Society by Karl Schaefer in 1918. The cultural critic Abram B. Enns emphasizes that there were two qualified private collectors in Lübeck who made it possible for museum director Carl Georg Heise to acquire modern art in Lübeck in the 1920s until his dismissal in 1933: Max Linde and Siegfried Buchenau.

Artworks in the Buchenau collection included (among others:

- Peasant couple by a well with a distant view of Paris (attributed to Willem Kalf)
- The marriage of Tobias and Sarah (Jan Steen)
- Young woman looking in the mirror, with a maidservant in an interior, 1662 (Quiringh van Brekelenkam)
- Mother with children in an interior, tweede helft 17th (Caspar Netscher or possibly Joost van Geel or studio of Caspar Netsche
- Peasants making merry before an inn, 17th (circle of Adriaen Brouwer)
- View of the garden of Huis ten Bosch, 1668 (Jan van der Heyden)
- Heuvellandschap met enkele ruiters die hun paarden drenken (Philips Wouwerman)
- Boy at the Brook (Hans Thoma)

Buchenau bequeathed his art collector to his wife, Anna Buchenau.

== Legacy and family ==
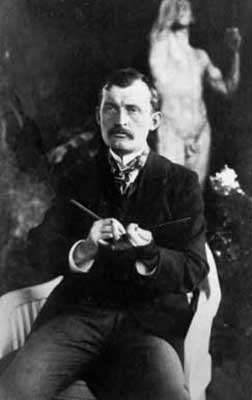
Edvard Munch in 1902 in the garden of the Lindesche Villa in Lübeck. In the background Auguste Rodin's Iron Age, which became part of the Buchenau Collection after the First World War

Buchenau's son Franz (Wilhelm) Buchenau (born 29 September 1900 in Torreón; died 13 March 1969 in Mexico City) became manager of the Solingen export company Heinrich Böker.

His daughter Margarete (born 1913) married the printer Alfred Zantop (born1900 in Wildungen), whom the Allies later suspected of being a Nazi agent in Spain. Zantop dealt in looted art for Hermann Göring and sold several artworks through the Nazi art buyer Alois Miedl. Zantop is listed as a Red Flag Name in the Art Looting Investigation Unit Final Report of 1946.

A son of Alfred and Margarete Zantop, the geologist professor at Dartmouth College Half Zantop, was murdered together with his wife Susanne in 2001.

Parts of the Siegfried Buchenau collection were said to be included in their estate.
