= Hermann Hans Wetzler =

German-American composer

Hermann Hans Wetzler (8 September 1870 – 29 May 1943) was a German-American composer.

== Life ==
Wetzler was born in Frankfurt, Germany. His father was from Bohemia, his mother was German. He grew up in Chicago in affluent circumstances and studied first at the University of Cincinnati - College-Conservatory of Music, from 1885 at the Hoch Conservatory in Frankfurt piano and violin with Clara Schumann, Hugo Heermann, Bernhard Scholz, Iwan Knorr and Engelbert Humperdinck. In 1903, he founded the Wetzler Symphony Orchestra with donations, at which Richard Strauss made his US conducting debut in 1904 and premiered his Sinfonia Domestica. In 1905 Wetzler returned to Germany to work as a Kapellmeister in Hamburg, Elberfeld, Riga, Halle, Lübeck and Cologne.

After the latter contract was not renewed in 1923, he lived in Cologne as a freelance composer and conductor. He wrote major works for orchestra from 1917 and finally also the opera The Basque Venus based on a libretto by his wife Lini Wetzler née Dienstbach (1876–1933).

In 1929, he moved to Brissago, in 1932 to Basel, where he lectured in 1933, and then to Ascona. In Germany, he was banned from performing in 1935 because of his Jewish origins. After the outbreak of war, he left Switzerland and settled in New York in 1940, where he died on 29 May 1943 at the age of 72.

His estate has been in the Zentralbibliothek Zürich since 2006 and contains, in addition to music autographs and writings, around 10,000 letters, 6000 reviews and photographs.

== Work ==
- Theatermusik zu Shakespeares Wie es euch gefällt (1917), op. 7
- Weissenrode, Symphonische Phantasie für Orchester (1922), op. 10
- Visionen for Orchester (1923), op. 12
- Assisi, Legende für Orchester (1924), op. 13
- Die baskische Venus, Opera after Prosper Mérimée (1928), op. 14
- Symphonie concertante for violin and orchestra (1932), op. 15
