= Bowie High School (Arlington, Texas) =

Secondary school in Texas, United States

James Bowie High School

Location
- 2101 Highbrank Dr; Arlington, Tarrant County, Texas 76018; United States; 32.662126°N 97.073092°W

Information
- Type: Public High School
- Motto: "Cross the Line" or "BBAW"
- Established: 1973 (current building in 1991)
- School district: Arlington Independent School District
- Principal: Justin Edwards
- Teaching staff: 157.89 (FTE)
- Grades: 9–12
- Enrollment: 2,355 (2023–2024)
- Student to teacher ratio: 14.92
- Colors: Royal Blue White and Orange
- Athletics: UIL Class 6A
- Mascot: Volunteers
- Rival: Sam Houston High School and Martin High School
- Website: www.aisd.net/bowie-high-school/

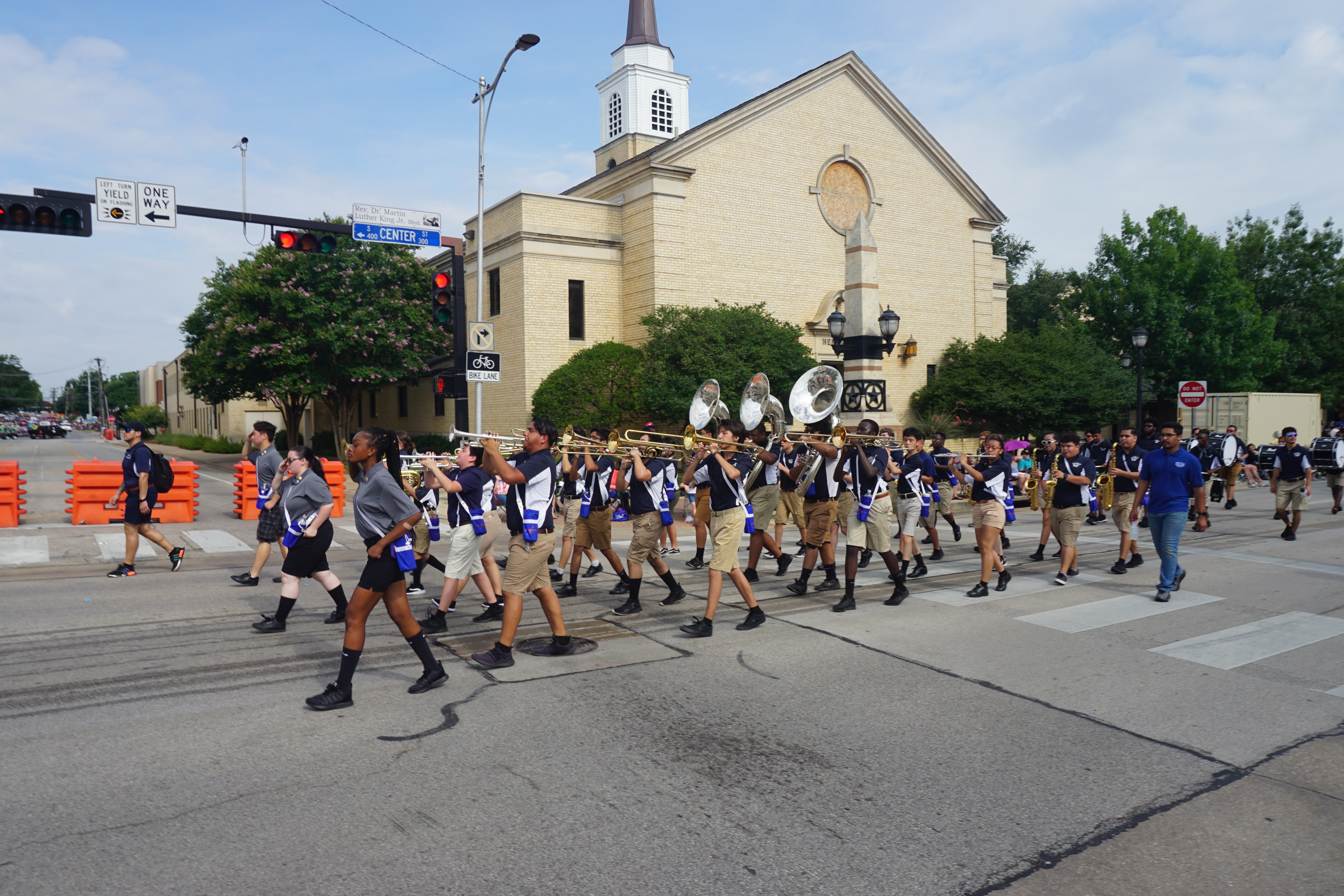
The Bowie High School Band in the 2021 Arlington Independence Day Parade

James Bowie High School is a public high school in Arlington, Texas. The school is a part of Arlington Independent School District and serves students in grades 9 through 12 in southeast Arlington and southwest Grand Prairie. Bowie High competes in Class 6A within the University Interscholastic League that governs interschool athletic, artistic, and academic competition in Texas.

== History ==
=== The Original Bowie High School ===
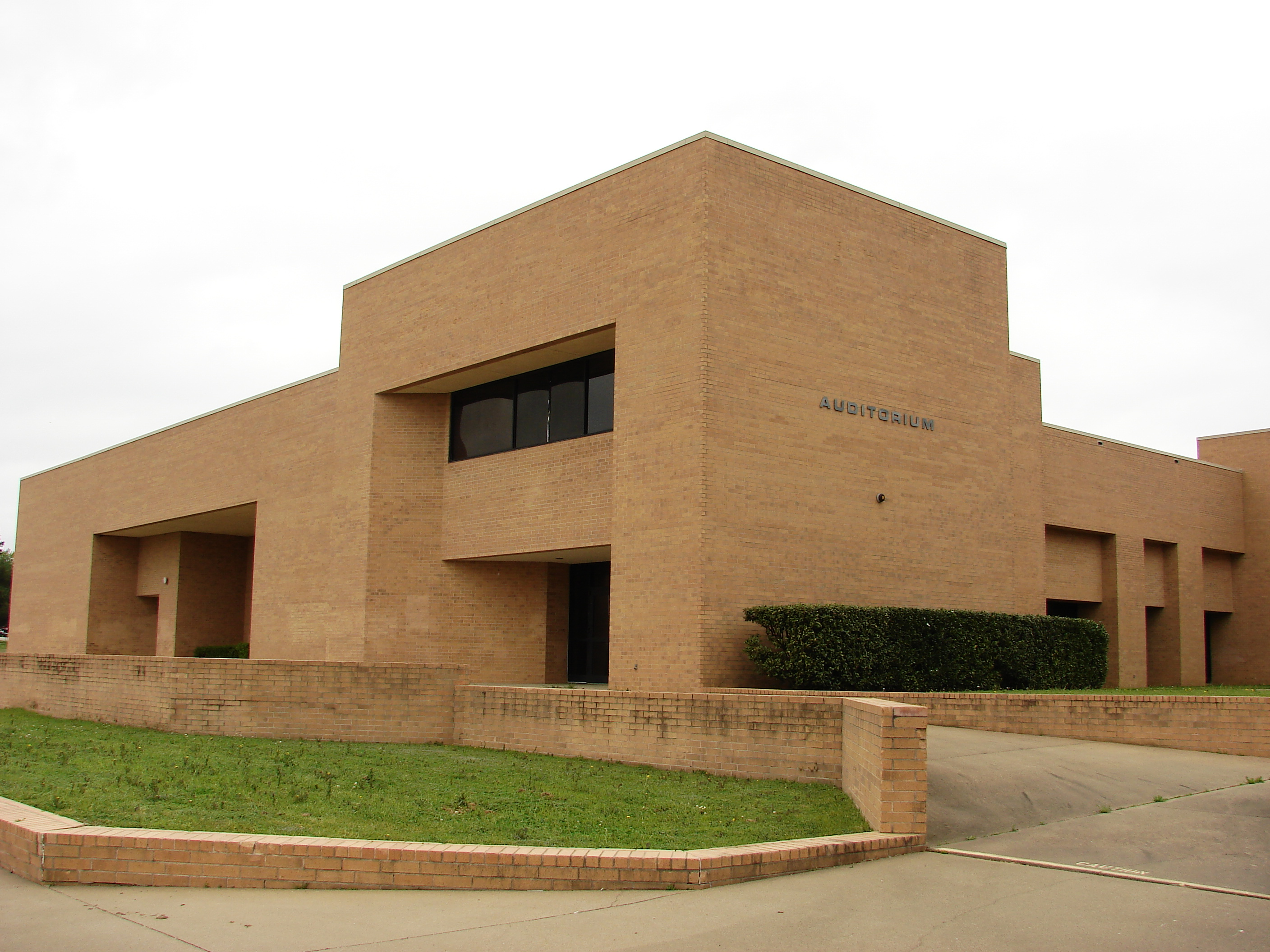
Original James Bowie High School campus

The original Bowie High School opened in 1973, relieving Sam Houston High School. The original Bowie, AISD's fourth high school, was located three miles from Sam Houston. Many students in the Houston zone wanted to transfer to Bowie because it was newer, and the transfer process made it easy for them to do so.

Martin High School opened in 1982, and the growth patterns in southern Arlington changed, so the district choose to close the original Bowie the following year. As of that year, the original building is now Workman Junior High School.

=== Current building ===
In 1991, Bowie reopened and moved to its current building on Highbank Drive.

=== Shooting ===
On April 24, 2024, James Bowie High School was placed on lockdown due to shots being fired by the school's portable buildings. Officers from the Arlington Police Department and an on-site School Resource Officer responded and saw 18-year old Etavion Barnes on the ground. Officers noted Barnes was unresponsive and soon began providing aid to Barnes until he was transported by an ambulance to Medical City Arlington. The perpetrator, a 17-year-old student, was arrested not far from the scene. It was confirmed that the perpetrator knew the victim before the shooting, although no motive had been found at the time. The victim died at the hospital at 3:27 p.m., according to the Tarrant County Medical Examiner's Office. As a result, murder charges were brought against the perpetrator.

== Feeder patterns ==
Bryant, Farrell, Starrett, West, and portions of Beckham and Remynse Elementaries feed into Barnett Jr. High. Barnett sends all of its students to BHS. Foster Elementary sends a portion of its population to Gunn Jr. High. Gunn sends the majority of its students to BHS and the rest goes to Arlington. Fitzgerald Elementary feeds into Ousley Jr. High. Ousley sends a portion of its population to BHS. Burgin and McNutt Elementaries feed into Workman Jr. High. Workman splits its students between Bowie and Sam Houston.

== Academics ==
In May 2006, Bowie High School joined the International Baccalaureate program. The Class of 2008 was the first class offered the opportunity to earn the IB Diploma.

The school participates in the Advanced Placement Program, offering the following Advanced Placement (AP) classes: AP Art: Studio Drawing, AP Art: Studio 2-D Design, AP Biology, AP Calculus AB/BC, AP Chemistry, AP Computer Science, AP English Language and Composition, AP English Literature and Composition, AP Environmental Science, AP European History, AP French Language and Culture, AP Geography, AP Government, AP Government and Politics, AP Latin, AP Macroeconomics, AP Physics C: Mechanics, AP Psychology, AP Spanish Language and Culture, AP Statistics, AP US History, and AP World History.

Dual credit courses, taken at Tarrant County College (SE Campus) and/or UT Arlington, are offered in Algebra II, Art IV, English IV, Geology, Government/Economics, Music History, Psychology and Sociology.

== Notable alumni ==
- Darrell Lance Abbott — Went to Bowie for a short time. Also known as "Diamond Darrell", "Dimebag Darrell", "Dimebag" or simply "Dime", of Hard-Rock band Pantera.
- Vincent Paul Abbott — Also known as "Vinnie Paul", of Hard-Rock band Pantera.
- DJ Campbell (Class of 2022) — Offensive tackle for the Texas Longhorns and offensive guard for the Miami Dolphins
- Cade Cunningham (Class of 2020) — NBA point guard. Went to Bowie for a short time and later transferred to Montverde Academy in Montverde, Florida.
- Kyler Edwards (born 1999) — basketball guard in the Israeli Basketball Premier League
- Katie Featherston (Class of 2001) — Actress, known for portraying 'Katie' in the Paranormal Activity horror film franchise.
- Terry Glaze (Class of 1982) — Original lead singer of the heavy metal band Pantera and lead singer of MCA recording artist and 80's Hair Metal band Lord Tracy. Lord Tracy album "Deaf Gods of Babylon" is number 50 on Rolling Stone Magazines 50 Greatest Hair Metal albums of all time.
- Todrick Hall (Class of 2003) - singer, rapper, choreographer, and YouTuber.
- Russell Hansbrough (Class of 2012) — NFL running back
- Kolby Listenbee (Class of 2012) — NFL wide receiver
- Maren Morris (Class of 2008) — Country and pop music artist
- Ty Nsekhe (Class of 2003) — NFL offensive tackle
- Kamaru Usman — Former UFC Welterweight Champion
- Vernon Wells (Class of 1997) — Major League Baseball outfielder
