= V'Keon Lacey =

American football player (born 1988)

No. 5, 10
- Position: Wide receiver

Personal information
- Born: August 8, 1988 (age 38)
- Listed height: 6 ft 4 in (1.93 m)
- Listed weight: 215 lb (98 kg)

Career information
- High school: Arlington (Arlington, Texas)
- College: Angelo State
- NFL draft: 2011: undrafted

Career history
- Jacksonville Sharks (2012); Cedar Rapids Titans (2013); San Jose SaberCats (2013)*; Philadelphia Soul (2014); Portland Thunder (2015); Tampa Bay Storm (2016)
- * Offseason or practice squad member only

Career AFL statistics
- Receptions: 166
- Receiving yards: 1,790
- Receiving TDs: 47
- Tackles: 21
- Fumbles recovered: 1
- Stats at ArenaFan.com

V'Keon Lacey (born August 8, 1988) is an American former professional football wide receiver. He first enrolled at Cisco College before transferring to the Southwestern Oklahoma State University and lastly Angelo State University. Lacey was a member of the Jacksonville Sharks, Cedar Rapids Titans, San Jose SaberCats, Philadelphia Soul, Portland Thunder, and Tampa Bay Storm.

== Early life ==
Lacey played high school football at Arlington High School in Arlington, Texas, earning all-district honors. In high school, he broke the growth plate under his knee while playing basketball in his driveway. He had to have nine surgeries over nine months in order to recover.

== College career ==
Lacey first played college football in 2007 for the Cisco Wranglers of Cisco College. He transferred to play for the Southwestern Oklahoma State Bulldogs in 2008. He played for the Angelo State Rams from 2009 to 2010. Lacey started all eleven games at wide receiver his junior year in 2009, earning All-LSC South Division Offense second team honors while compiling 878 yards and ten touchdowns on 74 receptions.

== Professional career ==
Lacey signed with the Jacksonville Sharks on March 9, 2012. He was released by the Sharks on June 4, 2012. He appeared in three games as a rookie for the Sharks in 2012, recording half a tackle.

Lacey played for the Cedar Rapids Titans of the Indoor Football League during the 2013 season.

Lacey was signed by the San Jose SaberCats on March 5, 2013. He was released by the SaberCats on March 8, 2013.

Lacey played for the Philadelphia Soul in 2014, recording 447 yards and twelve touchdowns on 41 receptions. He was named the AFL Pulse Player of the Week on July 26, 2014, for recent philanthropic efforts, which include actively participating in the American Foundation for Suicide Prevention’s Out of the Darkness Walks.

Lacey signed with the Portland Thunder on January 20, 2015. He became a free agent after the 2015 season.

On November 13, 2015, Lacey was assigned to the Tampa Bay Storm.
