= Russell Hansbrough =

American football player (born 1993)

No. 44
- Position: Running back

Personal information
- Born: November 19, 1993 (age 32); Arlington, Texas, U.S.
- Listed height: 5 ft 9 in (1.75 m)
- Listed weight: 195 lb (88 kg)

Career information
- High school: Bowie (Arlington, Texas)
- College: Missouri (2012–2015)
- NFL draft: 2016: undrafted

Career history
- Tampa Bay Buccaneers (2016); New York Giants (2016)*; Tampa Bay Buccaneers (2016–2017); Los Angeles Chargers (2017); Washington Redskins (2018–2019)*; Calgary Stampeders (2020–2021)*
- * Offseason or practice squad member only
- Stats at Pro Football Reference

Russell Douglas Hansbrough (born November 19, 1993) is an American former football running back. He played college football at Missouri, and was signed as an undrafted free agent by the Tampa Bay Buccaneers in 2016. He also played for the New York Giants, Los Angeles Chargers, and Washington Redskins.

== Professional career ==
=== Tampa Bay Buccaneers ===
Hansbrough signed with the Tampa Bay Buccaneers as an undrafted free agent following the 2016 NFL draft. He was released on September 5, 2016, and was re-signed to the practice squad the following day. Hansbrough was released on September 14, and re-signed on October 5. He was promoted to the active roster on October 10. Hansbrough was released by Tampa Bay on October 17, and was re-signed to the practice squad. He was promoted back to the active roster on November 7, but was released again on November 12. Hansbrough was re-signed to the practice squad on November 15. He was released by the Buccaneers on November 22.

=== New York Giants ===
On December 14, 2016, Hansbrough was signed to the New York Giants' practice squad.

=== Tampa Bay Buccaneers (second stint) ===
On December 27, 2016, Hansbrough was signed by the Tampa Bay Buccaneers off the Giants' practice squad. He was waived on September 2, 2017, and was signed to the Buccaneers' practice squad the next day. Hansbrough was released by the Buccaneers on October 3.

=== Los Angeles Chargers ===
On December 12, 2017, Hansbrough was signed to the Los Angeles Chargers' practice squad. He was promoted to the active roster on December 29. On September 1, 2018, Hansbrough was waived by Los Angeles.

=== Washington Redskins ===
On December 18, 2018, Hansbrough was signed to the Washington Redskins' practice squad. He signed a reserve/future contract with the Redskins on January 3, 2019, but was waived on May 13.

=== Calgary Stampeders ===
In May 2020, Hansbrough signed with the Calgary Stampeders of the Canadian Football League. He was released by the Stampeders on June 16, 2021.
