= Boone Stutz =

American football player (born 1982)

No. 47, 89
- Position: Long snapper

Personal information
- Born: November 4, 1982 (age 44); Fort Worth, Texas, U.S.
- Listed height: 6 ft 6 in (1.98 m)
- Listed weight: 256 lb (116 kg)

Career information
- High school: Martin (Arlington, Texas)
- College: Texas A&M, Alabama

Career history
- Atlanta Falcons (2006–2007); Seattle Seahawks (2007)

Career statistics
- Games played: 28
- Total tackles: 1
- Stats at Pro Football Reference

Jeffrey Boone Stutz (born November 4, 1982) was a former tight end and long snapper for Texas A&M University and long snapper in the National Football League (NFL). He was released by the Seattle Seahawks on December 11, 2007. Stutz is the son of Barbara and Paul Stutz of Arlington, Texas.

== Early life ==
He met then TCU head coach Dennis Franchione and planned to walk on for the Horned Frogs. When Franchione became the head coach at Alabama, Stutz packed his bags for Tuscaloosa

== College career ==
He redshirted at Alabama. In 2002, he played one game with the Crimson Tide for Franchione. When Franchione accepted the head coach position at Texas A&M, Stutz followed him to College Station and enrolled at A&M in the fall. Stutz sat out the football season per NCAA transfer rules. He had a solid 2004 season at Texas A&M, starting eight games at tight end in playing in all 12 of the Aggies games as a deep snapper and on special teams. Had 11 catches for 142 yards and one touchdown. Nine of his catches produced first downs. Had a career-best four catches for 49 yards against Clemson.

In 2005, he became the team's full-time deep snapper, playing in all 12 of the Aggies' games in that capacity and started two games at tight end, making two catches for 26 yards and a touchdown. He also caught a 7-yard touchdown pass in the Magnolia Gridiron All-Star Classic – a postseason all-star game.

== Professional career ==
=== 2006 season ===
He was originally signed as an undrafted rookie free agent with the Tampa Bay Buccaneers. After being cut by the Bucs, Stutz was picked up by the Atlanta Falcons and won the starting long snapping job. He was the snapper when Morten Andersen broke the NFL career scoring record, and is featured in the Pro Football Hall of Fame.

=== 2007 season ===
On October 2, 2007 the Falcons released him. He signed with the Seahawks on October 10, 2007.

== NASCAR career ==
In 2014, Stutz transitioned to NASCAR, joining Stewart–Haas Racing's pit stop development program. The following year, he became the gasman for SHR driver Danica Patrick's No. 10 team.
