= Martin High School (Arlington, Texas) =

James W. Martin High School
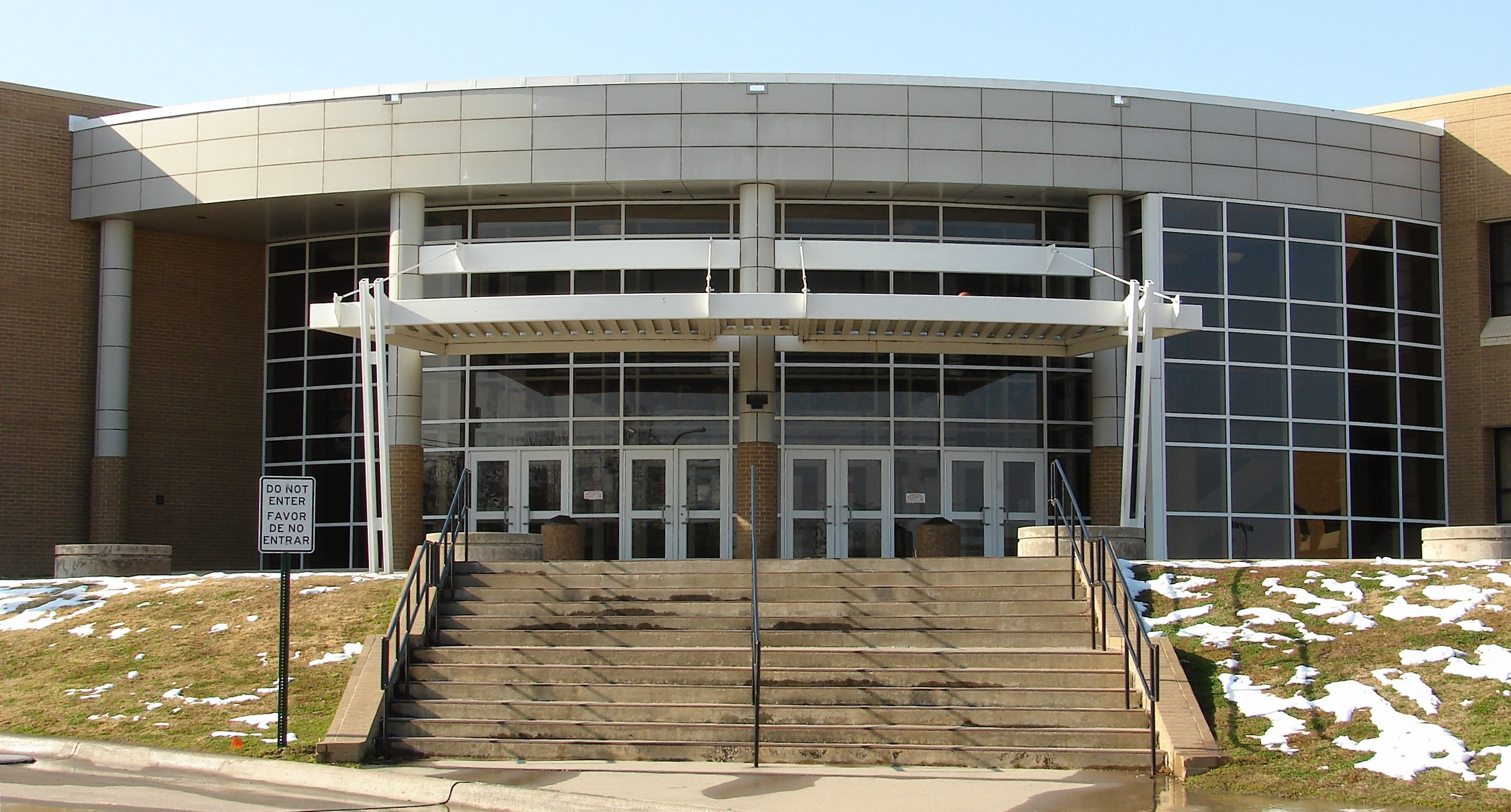

Location
- 4501 West Pleasant Ridge Road; Arlington, Texas 76016; United States; 32°41′02″N 97°10′48″W

Information
- Type: Public
- Established: 1982
- School district: Arlington Independent School District
- Principal: Victoria Youngblood-Baldwin
- Teaching staff: 208.03 (FTE)
- Grades: 9–12
- Enrollment: 3,670 (2023–2024)
- Student to teacher ratio: 17.64
- Colors: Black, red and silver
- Nickname: Warriors
- Website: www.aisd.net/martin-high-school/

James W. Martin High School is a secondary school for grades 9 to 12 in Arlington, Texas, United States. It is part of the Arlington Independent School District. The school's colors are red, black and silver.

== History ==
The school opened in 1982. As a result, the former James Bowie High School closed in 1983. The relative proximity of Bowie to Sam Houston High School was a factor as was the shifting demographics and resulting graduation class sizes that necessitated the new school and the transition of Bowie to Workman Junior High School. Cathy Brown of The Dallas Morning News wrote that Sam Houston High School and Lamar High School were "relatively unaffected" by the opening of Martin, located in southwest Arlington. She explained that the attendance zone of Arlington High School lost substantial area that included a significant number of new residences in the more affluent Southwest part of the city adjacent to Lake Arlington.

Martin High School is one of only two high schools in the district not named for a historical figure in Texas. The trustees broke with the Arlington tradition of naming high schools in this manner when naming the school in its planning in the earlier 1980s. Only Martin High School and Arlington High School, the town's first high school, are exceptions. AISD trustees chose to honor James W. Martin, superintendent of schools from 1955 to 1976, who oversaw the integration (racial desegregation) of Arlington schools in 1965, which occurred without the violence or hysterics that had occurred frequently nationwide, and notably in nearby Mansfield. This was not shared at the time of the school's opening, however.

The school opened with grades 10 to 12 and grew to become the city's largest high school within a decade. Construction in 1996–1997 expanded the size of the campus considerably to make room for the addition of freshmen in the 1997–1998 school year.

In 2015, the AISD STEM Academy began classes at Martin. The Academy provides advanced classes in engineering, biology/biomedical science, computer science, and math/science to students in 9th-12th grade. STEM students can also take classes at the University of Texas at Arlington while they are enrolled in high school. The program is free, but spots are limited.

In July 2020, Principal Marlene Roddy announced the discontinuation of the native American mascot at the school, saying the reason was "...to adapt the school to modern standards of cultural sensitivity", which has been a contentious topic in many communities and in professional sports, notably the NFL's Washington (former) Redskins and the Cleveland Indians major league baseball team. The change was met with opposition, primarily from alumni, but it was implemented. The Warrior would remain in writing, but the modern definition of the term is being embraced and will no longer refer to the Native American iconography, specifically the war bonnet and mascot. The school's "rocking M" became its primary graphic. The "Native American tribal chieftain hat" logo had been in use at the school since its opening in 1982, having been illustrated by one of its students. The war bonnet was formed by shaping the letters comprising "Warriors" and the face was in the same manner using the letters MHS, both in red, forming a Native American chief in profile. Similar changes occurred later at nearby South Grand Prairie High School, which coincidentally are known at the Warriors.

== Feeder patterns ==
Corey, Moore and Wood Elementary Schools feed into Boles Jr. High. Ditto, Little, Miller, and a portion of Dunn Elementaries feed into Young Jr. High. Boles and Young Jr. Highs feed into Martin.

== Extracurricular activities ==
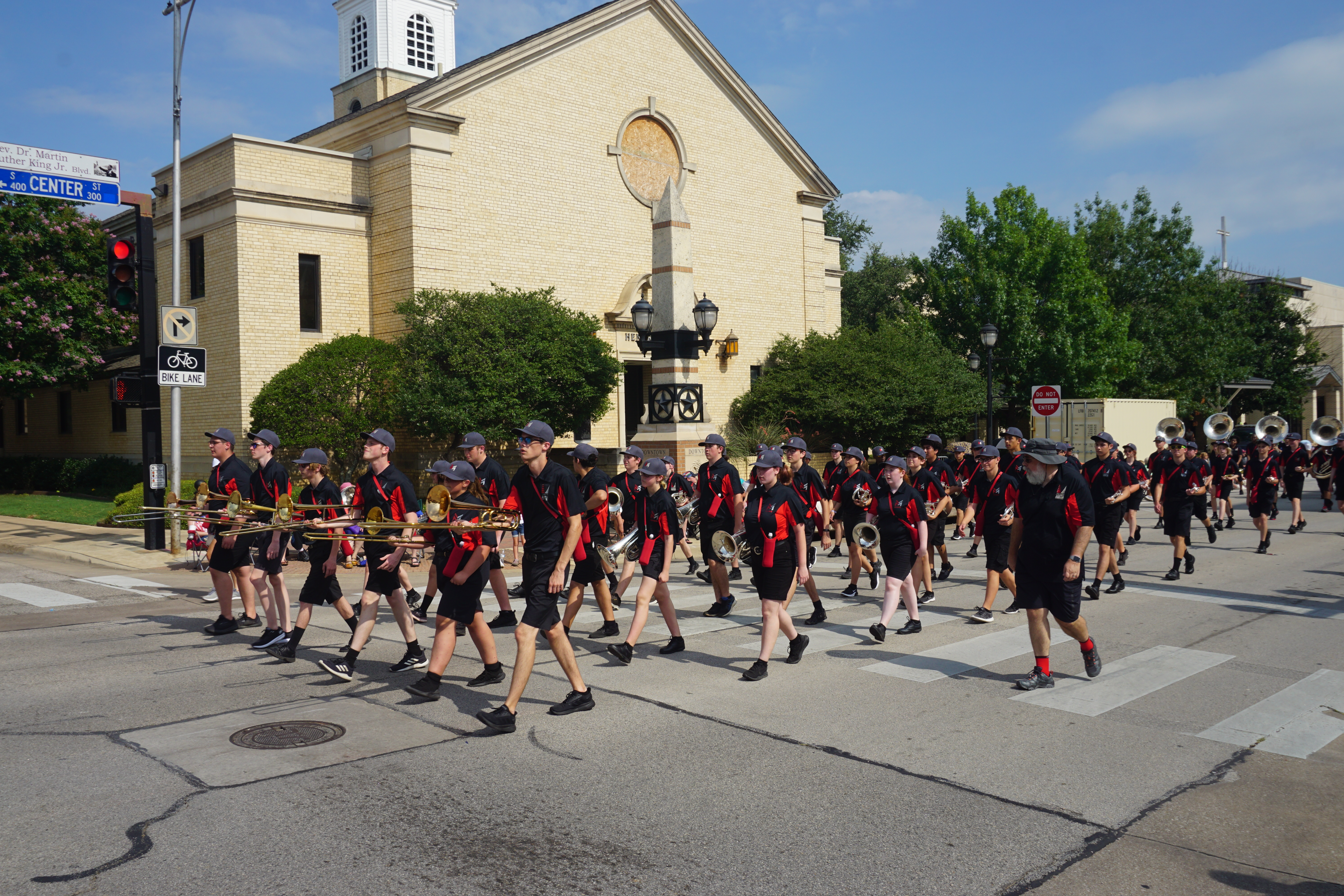
The Martin High School Band in the 2021 Arlington Independence Day Parade

=== Academic extracurriculars ===
Martin competes in Academic Decathlon and has teams in most of the UIL academic activities.

The Martin High School Robotics team has qualified for every UIL Robotics State Championship since robotics was added in 2016, finishing second in 2017 and 2018, third in 2019, and winning the state title in 2020.

The science team won the UIL 6A State Championship in 2021.

== Fine arts ==
Fine arts at the school include band, choir, orchestra, theatre, speech, and visual arts departments.

In 1996 Martin High School won Texas's annual UIL One-Act Play competition for the 5A conference with its production of Our Country's Good.

In 2009, the Martin Fine Arts department was the first place winner in the "Grammy in the Schools" nationwide competition, giving a $10,000 grant to the music department and naming the Martin High School as the #1 fine arts high school in the contest.

Martin's chorale choir performed at Carnegie Hall in New York City on March 14, 2006, for the Carnegie Hall National High School Choral Festival. The performance included the world premieres of Introit and Epilogue by Mack Wilberg. Martin's chorale, wind symphony and symphony orchestra performed at Carnegie Hall in New York City on March 21, 2016, with Distinguished Concerts International New York.

== Notable alumni ==
- Matt Blank, Major League Baseball (MLB) pitcher
- Elizabeth Bruenig, Pulitzer Prize for Feature Writing 2019 nominee
- Will Ganss, broadcast journalist & reporter for ABC News
- Myles Garrett, NFL American football player
- Mitch Grassi, tenor of a cappella group Pentatonix
- Ben Grieve, Major League Baseball outfielder
- Justin Hollins, NFL football player
- Scott Hoying, baritone of a cappella group Pentatonix
- Jason Huntley, NFL football player
- Nathan Karns, MLB pitcher
- Chase Lundt, NFL offensive tackle for the Buffalo Bills
- Kirstin Maldonado, mezzo-soprano of a cappella group Pentatonix
- Randi Miller, Olympic women's wrestling
- Brandon Moore, composer
- Blake Mycoskie, founder of TOMS Shoes
- Paige Mycoskie, founder of Aviator Nation
- Chris Odom, American football player
- Stacey Oristano, actress
- Tim Rushlow, country musician
- Tiya Sircar, actress
- Boone Stutz, NFL football player
- Lane Taylor, NFL offensive lineman
- Todd Van Poppel, Major League Baseball pitcher
- Emily Warfield, actress
- Tay-K, rapper and convicted murderer
