= Arlington Independent School District =

School district in Arlington, Texas

- Arlington ISD's location in the DFW Metroplex

Location
- 690 E. Lamar Blvd. Arlington, Texas 76011 ESC Region 11 USA
- Coordinates: 32°45′49.85″N 97°6′4.27″W

District information
- Type: Independent school district
- Grades: Pre-K through 12
- Superintendent: Matt Smith
- Schools: 73 (2024-25)
- NCES District ID: 4808700

Students and staff
- Students: 53,309 (2024-25)
- Teachers: 3,876.6 (2024-25) (on full-time equivalent (FTE) basis)
- Student–teacher ratio: 13.8 (2024-25)
- Athletic conference: UIL Class 6A, 5A Football

Other information
- TEA District Accountability Rating for 2011: Academically Acceptable
- Website: www.aisd.net

Arlington Independent School District (AISD) or Arlington ISD is a school district based in Arlington, Texas, United States.

The Arlington Independent School District covers the majority of Arlington and much of the Tarrant County portion of Grand Prairie. The district serves the entirety of the small towns of Pantego and Dalworthington Gardens. A portion of Fort Worth and Mansfield lies within the district; it only contains a wastewater plant. No Fort Worth residents are zoned to Arlington ISD schools.

== Governance ==
The Arlington Independent School District is governed by a publicly elected school board. The members of the board for the 2023-2024 school year were:

- Melody Fowler - president
- Justin Chapa - vice president
- Sarah McMurrough - secretary
- Aaron Reich - board member
- David Wilbanks - board member
- Brooklyn Richardson - board member
- Leanne Haynes - board member

In January 2024, Dr. Matt Smith was named superintendent of Arlington Independent School District.

== History ==
Arlington High School was the district's sole white high school until Sam Houston High School opened in 1963. The district desegregated in 1965. Lamar High School, the third high school, opened in 1970. Bowie High School served as the district's fourth high school, opening in 1973.

== Finances ==
As of the 2010-2011 school year, the appraised valuation of property in the district was $18,762,592,000. The maintenance tax rate was $0.104 and the bond tax rate was $0.030 per $100 of appraised valuation.

== Academic achievement ==
In 2011, the school district was rated "academically acceptable" by the Texas Education Agency. Forty-nine percent of districts in Texas in 2011 received the same rating. No state accountability ratings will be given to districts in 2012. A school district in Texas can receive one of four possible rankings from the Texas Education Agency: Exemplary (the highest possible ranking), Recognized, Academically Acceptable, and Academically Unacceptable (the lowest possible ranking).

Historical district TEA accountability ratings:

- 2011: Academically Acceptable
- 2010: Recognized
- 2009: Academically Acceptable
- 2008: Academically Acceptable
- 2007: Academically Acceptable
- 2006: Academically Acceptable
- 2005: Academically Acceptable
- 2004: Academically Acceptable

In 1997, at all high schools except one, the percentage of students passing each section of the Texas Assessment of Knowledge and Skills (TAKS) increased. At Lamar, the percentage of students passing the reading portion had decreased.

== Students ==
The AISD enrolls nearly 60,000 students, making it the 11th largest school district in Texas. It has an annual budget of $508,353,783, and spends $7,937 per year per student.

=== Demographics ===
As of March 2023, the district's student population was made up of the following ethnicities:

- 47.1% Hispanic
- 25.8% Black
- 17.9% White
- 5.8% Asian
- 2.8% multiracial

== Schools ==
As of the 2014-2015 school year, the Arlington Independent School District had a total of 76 schools, 10 high schools, 13 junior high schools and 53 elementary schools. This includes alternative schools.

=== High schools (grades 9-12) ===
- Arlington High School
- James Bowie High School
- Sam Houston High School
- Lamar High School
- James W. Martin High School
- Juan Seguin High School

==== Alternative high schools ====
- Arlington College and Career High School
- Arlington Collegiate High School at TCC-SE
- Newcomer Center at Venture High School
- Turning Point Secondary School
- Venture High School

=== Junior high schools (grades 7-8) ===
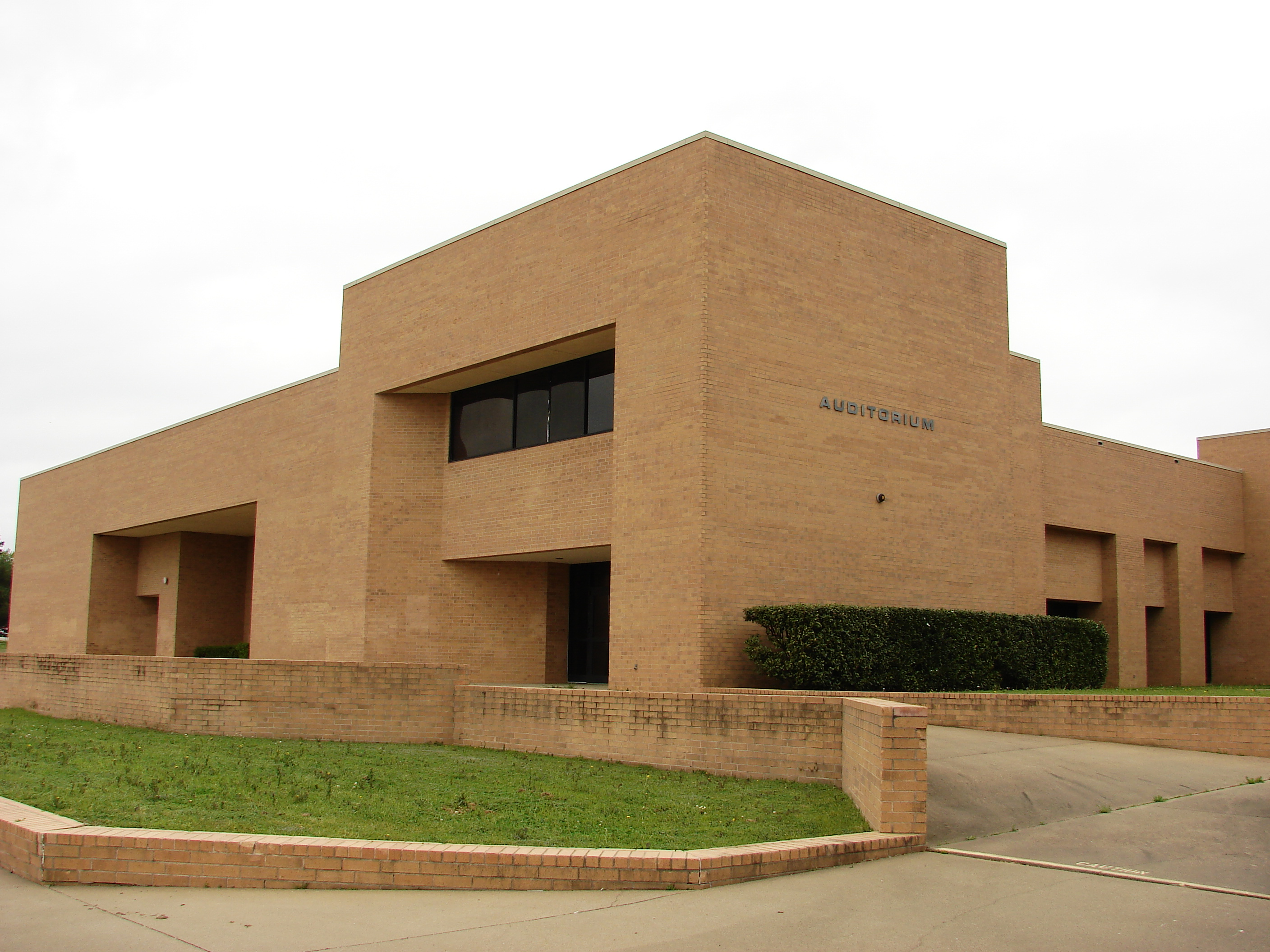
Mayfield Workman Junior High School (2010)

- Joe Bailey Junior High School
  - Bailey Junior high is located at 2411 Winewood St, Arlington, Texas. The school had 834 students enrolled in the 2010-2011 school year. Its school colors are red and white and its mascot is a ram. The student newspaper is called The Ram Page, and the yearbook is called Wild About Rams. The current principal is Tiffany Benavides.
- Christine Barnett Junior High School
- Truett C. Boles Junior High School
- James I. Carter Junior High School (closed, demolished; replaced by Joey Rodriguez Junior High School on the former Knox Elementary site)
- J.C. Ferguson Junior High School (closed; building now houses Newcomer Center and Venture HS)
- Floyd M. Gunn Junior High School
- Guy C. Hutcheson Junior High School (closed, demolished; became Dan Dipert Career and Technical Center)
- Dora E. Nichols Junior High School
- Emma Ousley Junior High School
- Joey Rodriguez Junior High School
- O.D. Shackelford Junior High School
- Mayfield Workman Junior High School
- Charles Young Junior High School

==== Alternative jr. high schools ====
- Turning Point Secondary School

=== Elementary schools (grades PK-6) ===
- Adams Elementary School
- Amos Elementary School
- Anderson Elementary School
- Ashworth Elementary School
- Atherton Elementary School
- Bebensee Elementary School
- Beckham Elementary School
- Berry Elementary School
- Bryant Elementary School
- Burgin Elementary School
- Butler Elementary School
- Corey Academy of Fine Arts and Dual Language
- Crouch Elementary School
- Crow Leadership Academy
- Ditto Elementary School
- Duff Elementary School
- Dunn Elementary School
- Ellis Elementary School
- Farrell Elementary School
- Fitzgerald Elementary School
- Foster Elementary School
- Goodman Elementary School
- Hale Elementary School
- Hill Elementary School
- Johns Elementary School
- Jones Academy of Fine Arts Jones and Dual Language
- Key Elementary School
- Larson Elementary School
- Jason B. Little Elementary School
- Miller Elementary School
- Mary Moore Elementary School
- McNutt Elementary School
- Morton Elementary School
- Patrick Elementary School
- Peach Elementary School
- Pearcy STEM Academy
- Pope Elementary School
- Rankin Elementary School
- Remynse Elementary School
- Sherrod Elementary School
- Short Elementary School
- South Davis Elementary School
- Speer Elementary School
- Starrett Elementary School
- Swift Elementary School
- Thornton Elementary School
- Webb Elementary School
- West Elementary School
- Williams Elementary School
- Wimbish World Language Academy
- Wood Elementary School

=== Kindergarten and pre-kindergarten ===
- Kooken Pre-Kindergarten School

== See also ==
- List of school districts in Texas
