= Wetzler Symphony Orchestra =

American symphony orchestra (1903–1905)

- Orchestra
- Founded: 1903
- Disbanded: 1905
- Location: New York City, U.S.
- Principal conductor: Hermann Hans Wetzler

The Wetzler Symphony Orchestra was founded in New York City by the Frankfurt-born conductor and composer Hermann Hans Wetzler.

Wetzler, who studied at the Hoch Conservatory in Frankfurt, settled in New York City for a time and formed the symphony orchestra in 1903. Wetzler invited Richard Strauss to the city to conduct his orchestra in a "Strauss Festival", which would include most of his symphonic works. Strauss and Wetzler conducted this orchestra in this concert series beginning on February 27, 1904, at Carnegie Hall. This series included Strauss conducting the premiere of his Symphonia Domestica on March 21. Strauss required 15 rehearsals before he was satisfied with the orchestra's playing. On March 19, the orchestra broke down in the middle of Don Quixote.

Strauss also led the orchestra before a crowd of 6,000 in performances on April 16 and 18, 1904, in Wanamaker's New York store. The orchestra was short-lived, as Wetzler returned to Germany in 1905.

== Sources ==
- "Herman Wetzler, Composer, 72, Dies". The New York Times. May 30, 1943. p. 26. ISSN 0362-4331. OCLC 1645522.
- "Music in America". The Musical Times. Vol. 45, no. 734. April 1, 1904. p. 249. ISSN 0027-4666. JSTOR 00274666. LCCN 54000525. OCLC 53165808.
- Tyler, Linda L. (Spring 1992). "'Commerce and Poetry Hand in Hand': Music in American Department Stores, 1880–1930". Journal of the American Musicological Society. 45 (1). University of California Press: 80/81. doi:10.2307/831490 – via JSTOR.
