= Symphonia Domestica =

Tone poem for large orchestra by Richard Strauss

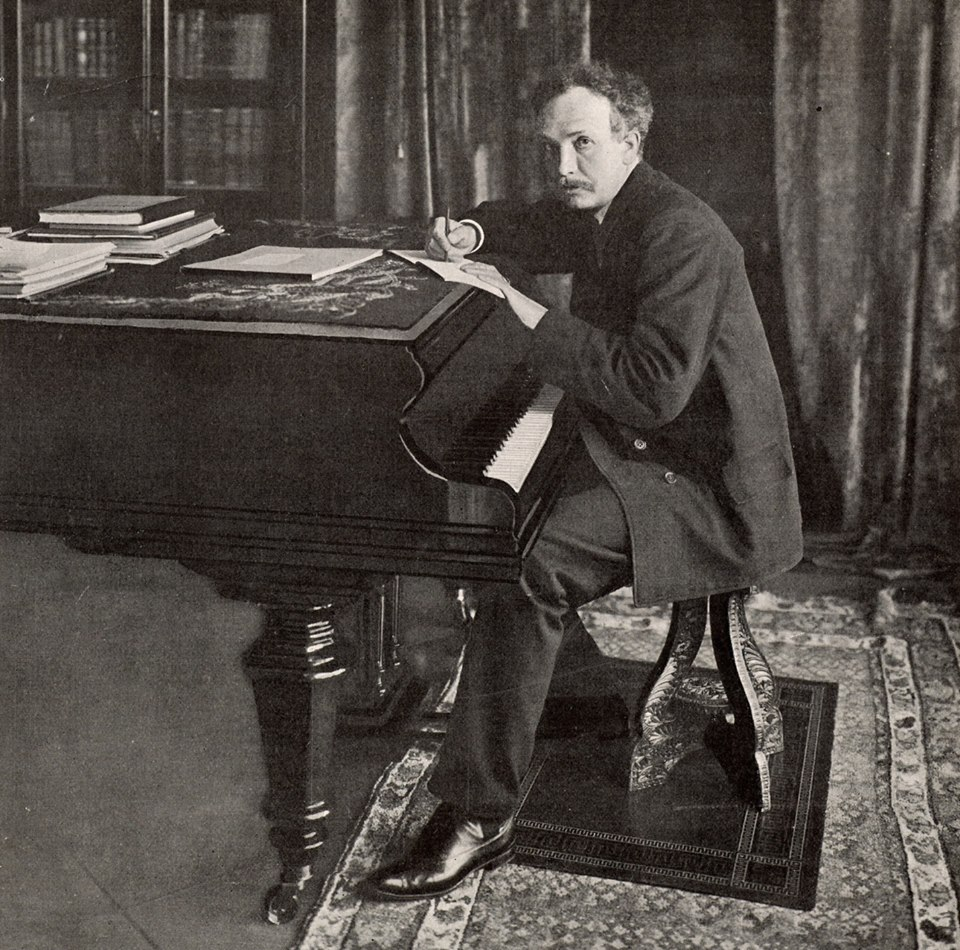
Strauss, 1903

Symphonia domestica, Op. 53, is a tone poem for large orchestra by Richard Strauss reflecting the secure domestic life valued by the composer and accordingly dedicated by him to "my dear wife and our young one."

== History and composition ==
In 1898, Strauss became the chief conductor of the Royal Court Opera in Berlin. It was at this point in his life that the composer took a keen interest in his own circumstances and turned his attention to his status and personal history. When he began composing the Symphonia Domestica, he intended it to be the sequel to Ein Heldenleben, the next installment of the autobiography of the now-successful artist.

He worked on the piece during 1903, finishing it on New Year's Eve, in Charlottenburg.

The piece is scored for piccolo, 3 flutes, 2 oboes, oboe d'amore, English horn, clarinet in D, 3 clarinets (2 in B♭, 1 in A), bass clarinet in B♭, 4 bassoons, contrabassoon, 4 saxophones (soprano in C, alto in F, baritone in F, bass in C) that are ad libitum (optional), 8 horns in F, 4 trumpets in F and C, 3 trombones, tuba, timpani, bass drum, triangle, cymbals, glockenspiel, 2 harps, and strings.

== Structure ==
Strauss with his wife and son, 1910

The program of the work reflects the simplicity of the subject matter. After the whole extended family (including the aunts and uncles) has been introduced, the parents are heard alone with their child. The next section is a three-part adagio which begins with the husband's activities. The clock striking 7 a.m. launches the finale.

The most detailed exposition of the work's structure is that which was provided for the Berlin Philharmonic's performance on 12 December 1904. On that occasion, the concert programme carried the following outline:

- I. Introduction and development of the chief groups of themes

The husband's themes (F major):

(a) Easy-going (gemächlich)

(b) Dreamy (träumerisch)

(c) Surly (mürrisch)

(d) Fiery (feurig)

The wife's themes (B major):

(a) Lively and gay (sehr lebhaft)

(b) Grazioso

The child's theme (D minor):

Tranquil (ruhig)

- II. Scherzo

Parents' happiness. Childish play.

Cradle song [quotation from Felix Mendelssohn's "Venetian Boat Song", Op. 19b, No. 6 from Songs Without Words] (The clock strikes seven in the evening).

- III. Adagio

Doing and thinking. Love scene. Dreams and cares (the clock strikes seven in the morning).

- IV. Finale

Awakening and merry dispute (double fugue). Joyous confusion.

I. Thema

II. Thema

== Performance ==
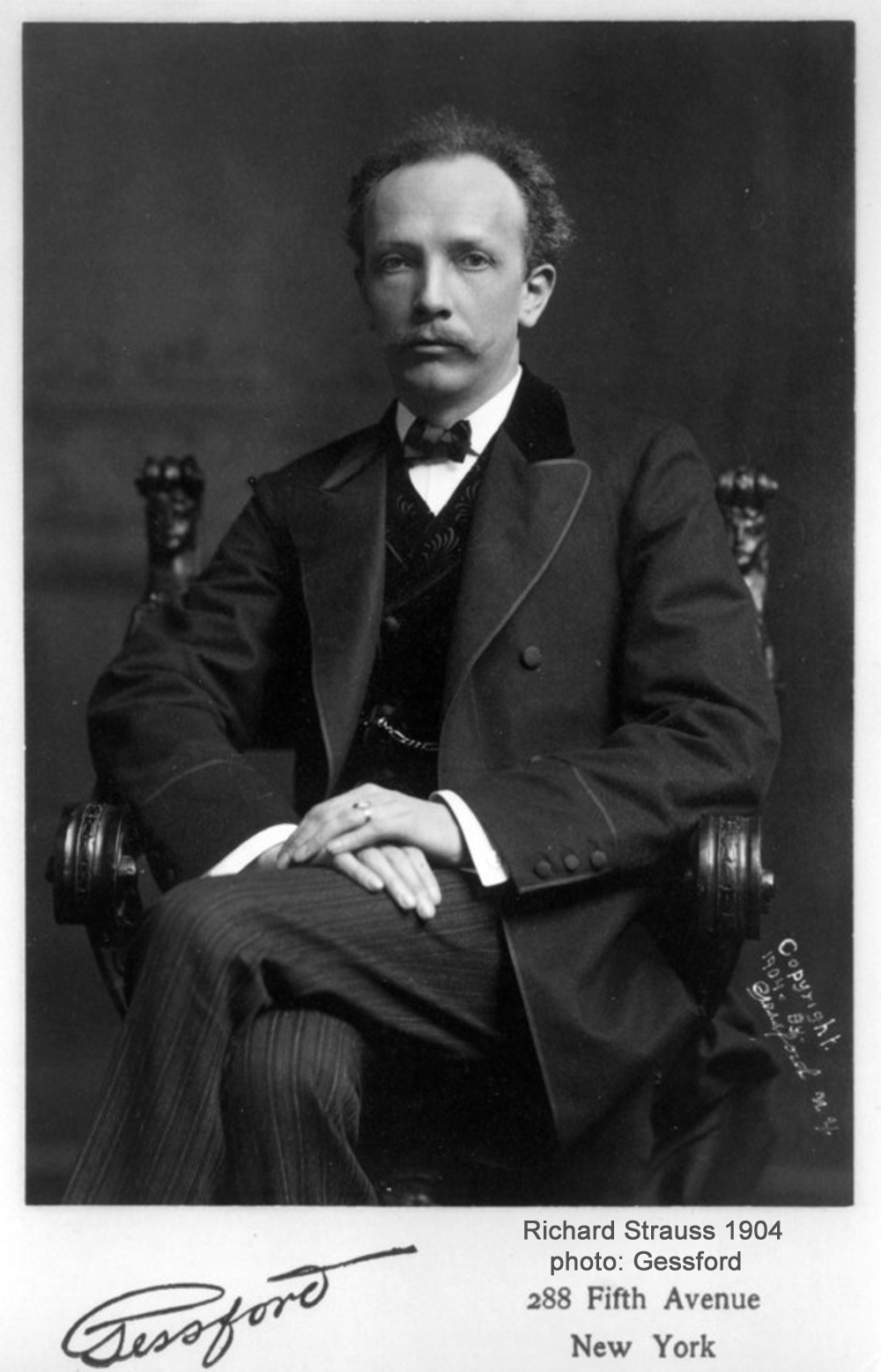
Photograph of Strauss taken in New York during his 1904 US tour

Strauss reserved the premiere for his American tour in 1904, and Carnegie Hall in New York was booked. He would conduct it himself. Originally the premiere was scheduled for 9 March, but the orchestral parts were delayed, so it was postponed to 21 March. The later date allowed more rehearsals, of which 15 were required before Strauss was satisfied. The Wetzler Symphony Orchestra was adequate, but not much more. During a performance of his Don Quixote two nights earlier, the orchestra had broken down in the middle of the piece.

Nevertheless, the performance was a great success, so much so that he was prevailed upon to conduct two more performances in Wanamaker's department store in New York, on 16 and 18 April, for a fee of $1,000. An entire sales floor had to be cleared to make way for the huge orchestra, and the concerts attracted audiences of 6,000 people. The New York and German press were very critical, not just of these exhibitions but of the very work itself, regarding them as a blatant commercialization of the sacred art of music and the intimacy of family life. Strauss responded: "True art ennobles this Hall, and a respectable fee for his wife and child is no disgrace even for an artist".

The Viennese premiere of the Domestica was conducted by Gustav Mahler on 23 November 1904.

A typical performance of the work lasts approximately forty-four minutes.

In 1924 Strauss wrote the Wedding Prelude for two harmoniums (Trv 247) for the occasion of the wedding of his son Franz with Alice Grab-Hermannswörth, based largely on themes found in the Symphonia Domestica. In 1925, Strauss wrote a piece for Paul Wittgenstein for piano left-hand and orchestra, again using themes from the Symphonia Domestica, titled Parergon zur Symphonia Domestica, Op. 73.

== Discography ==
Conductor	Orchestra	Recorded
Eugene Ormandy	Philadelphia Orchestra	1938
Carl Schuricht	Orchestra of La Scala Opera House, Milan	1941
Richard Strauss	Vienna Philharmonic	1944
Wilhelm Furtwängler	Berliner Philharmoniker	1944
Richard Strauss	Philharmonia Orchestra	1947
Franz Konwitschny	Staatskapelle Dresden	1956
Clemens Krauss	Vienna Philharmonic	1952
Fritz Reiner	Chicago Symphony Orchestra	1956
George Szell	Cleveland Orchestra	1957
Dimitri Mitropoulos	Wiener Philharmoniker	1957
Jascha Horenstein	BBC Symphony Orchestra	1961
Zubin Mehta	Los Angeles Philharmonic	1968
Hilde Somer	San Antonio Symphony Orchestra	1969
Rudolf Kempe	Staatskapelle Dresden	1972
Herbert von Karajan	Berliner Philharmoniker	1973
Lorin Maazel	Vienna Philharmonic	1983
Zubin Mehta	Berliner Philharmoniker	1985
Neeme Järvi	Scottish National Orchestra	1986
Gerard Schwarz	Seattle Symphony	1988
Edo de Waart	Minnesota Orchestra	1990
Wolfgang Sawallisch	Philadelphia Orchestra	1993
Lorin Maazel	Bavarian Radio Symphony Orchestra	1995
André Previn	Vienna Philharmonic	1995
Vladimir Ashkenazy	Czech Philharmonic Orchestra	1997
David Zinman	Zurich Tonhalle Orchestra	2002
Antoni Wit	Staatskapelle Weimar	2009
Gerard Schwartz	Seattle Symphony	2012
Marek Janowski	Rundfunk-Sinfonieorchester Berlin	2015
François-Xavier Roth	SWR Sinfonieorchester Baden-Baden und Freiburg	2017

There is also a two-piano version, which Martha Argerich and Alexandre Rabinovitch recorded in 1995 for Teldec.
