= Sam Houston High School (Arlington, Texas) =

School in Arlington, Texas, United States

Location
- 2000 Sam Houston Drive; Arlington, Tarrant County, Texas 76014; United States; 32.703341°N 97.076229°W

Information
- Type: Co-Educational, Public, Secondary
- Motto: In the halls of Sam Houston, there are no strangers
- Established: 1963
- School district: Arlington Independent School District
- Principal: Lee Jones
- Teaching staff: 204.10 (FTE)
- Grades: 9-12
- Enrollment: 3,177 (2023–2024)
- Student to teacher ratio: 15.57
- Colors: Red, white and blue
- Athletics: UIL Class 6A
- Mascot: The Long Tall Texan
- Accreditation: Texas Education Agency
- Newspaper: "Texans Talk" Newspaper
- Yearbook: "Cherokee" Yearbook
- Website: aisd.net/sam

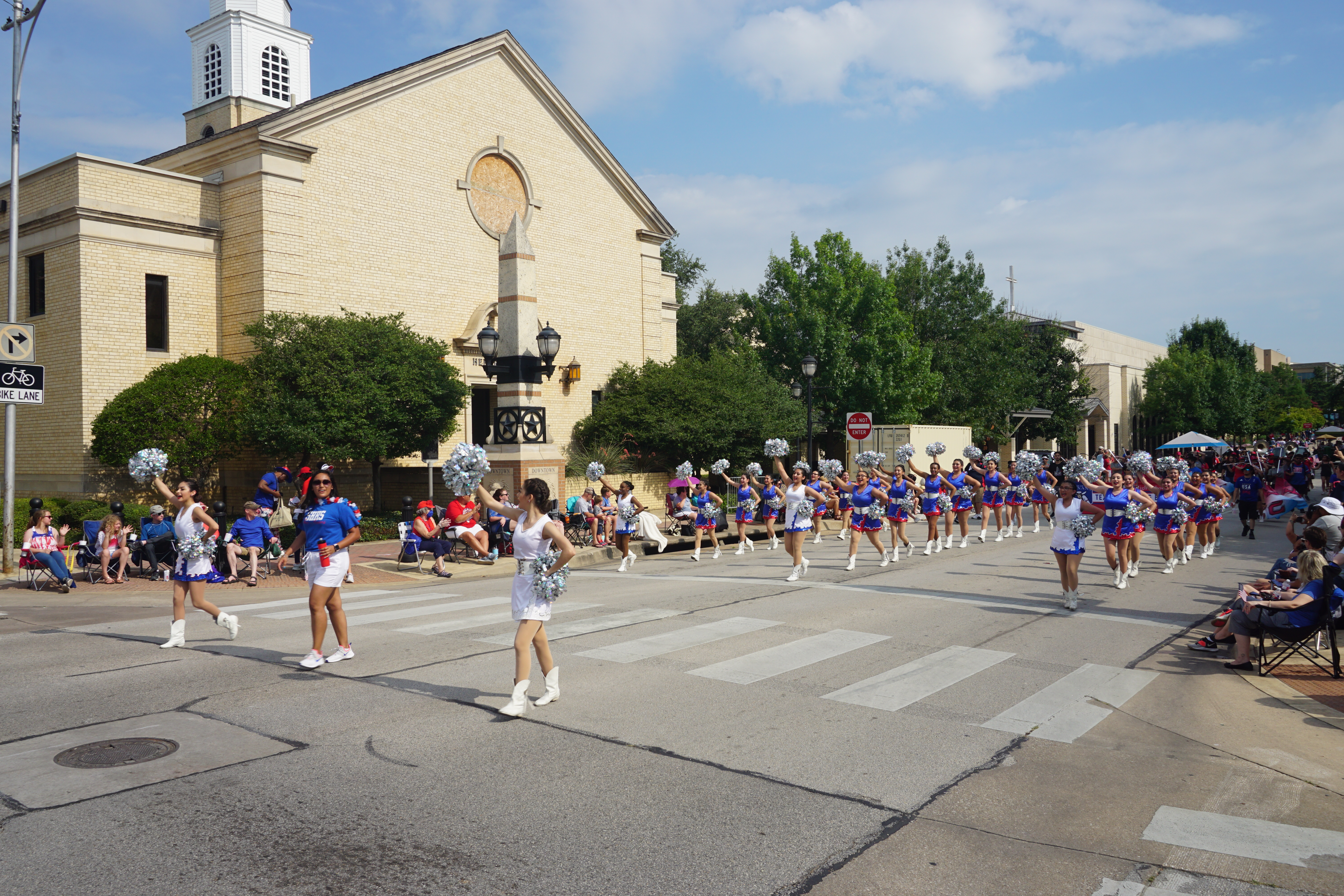
The Sam Houston High School Tex-Annes in the 2021 Arlington Independence Day Parade

Sam Houston High School, located in east Arlington, Texas, is a public high school serving grades 9–12.

It is one of the six high schools comprising the Arlington Independent School District in Arlington, Texas. The current principal is Lee Jones, who served as Principal at the in-district Rival of Sam Houston and the cohabitant of Wilemon Field, Bowie High School from 2021-2026.

The school is also known as Sam Houston HS, SHHS, and Big Sam. The mascot is the Long Tall Texan, and the colors are red, white, and blue.

== History ==
Sam Houston HS became Arlington School District's second high school when it opened in 1963 for the fall semester. The first graduating class was the Class of 1965. The school moved from its original location on Browning Drive to its current location on Sam Houston Drive in 1970. The original location became Hutcheson Junior High School.

The first IB graduating class was the Class of 2011. Since then, the school has had the most students participating in the IB program of all the high schools in the district. More than twenty students were awarded with the IB diploma with the Class of 2013.

The original Sam Houston campus was demolished in 2015 and was rebuilt as Dan Dipert Career and Technical Center in 2017. As of 2017, Sam Houston is the largest high school in Tarrant County with over 3,600 students. It is also one of the largest predominantly Hispanic high schools in Texas. In 2017, Sam Houston became the first Arlington ISD high school to open the 9th Grade Center. It was open to make room for freshmen of the 2017–2018 school year. In late fall of 2017, the school opened a second cafeteria addition.

== Feeder patterns ==
Anderson, Blanton, Crouch, Crow, Knox, Patrick, Rankin, Roark, Thornton, and a portion of Berry Elementaries feed into Carter Jr. High. Adams, Amos, Atherton, Goodman, Hale, Johns, Morton, Rankin, and Remynse Elementaries feed into Workman Jr. High. Carter and Workman Jr. Highs feed into Sam Houston.

== Academics ==
Sam Houston HS offers Dual Credit course opportunities at the Southeast Campus of Tarrant County College, a local community college. This is in addition to the following Accelerated Academic programs:

- AP (Advanced Placement) Program
- AVID (Advancement Via Individual Determination) Program
- IB (International Baccalaureate) Program
- TRIO Educational Talent Search Program
- TRIO Upward Bound Program

== Notable alumni ==
- Félix Enríquez Alcalá (class of 1969) - American film and television director.
- Mike Adams (class of 1992) - Wide Receiver Pittsburgh Steelers
- Thasunda Brown Duckett (class of 1991) - President & CEO of TIAA
- Mark Clayton (class of 2000) - Wide Receiver Baltimore Ravens
- Damon Dunn (class of 1994) - American politician, minister, and retired football player
- Trey Hillman (class of 1981) - Major League Baseball manager
- Lisa Love (class of 1974) - Former athletic director of Arizona State University.
- Guy Morriss (class of 1969) - Former center/guard (15 seasons) Philadelphia Eagles and New England Patriots; former head football coach at Baylor University
- Charles Randolph (class of 1981) - Film and TV writer; Won the Academy Award for the "Big Short" 2015
- M. David Rudd (class of 1979) - President, University of Memphis, Internationally known psychologist, Distinguished University Professor of Psychology
