= Rush Creek =

Rush Creek may refer to:

== Communities ==
- Rush Creek, Queensland, Australia
- Rush Creek, Wise County, Texas, U.S., a ghost town
- Rush Creek Township, Fairfield County, Ohio, U.S.

== Waterways ==
- Rush Creek (New South Wales), a tributary of the Hawkesbury-Nepean catchment, in New South Wales, Australia
- Rush Creek (Marin County, California)
- Rush Creek (Mono County, California)
- Rush Creek (Colorado)
- Rush Creek (Kishwaukee River tributary), a stream in Illinois
- Rush Creek (Root River tributary), a stream in Minnesota
- Rush Creek (Missouri River), a stream in Missouri
- Rush Creek (Texas), a tributary of Village Creek in Tarrant County, Texas

== Other ==
- Rush Creek Open Space Preserve
