= Green Oaks Boulevard =

Road in Texas, USA

- Length: 22.7 mi (36.5 km)
- CCW end: SH 360 in Arlington
- Major junctions: FM 157 in Arlington SH 180 in Fort Worth; Spur 303 in Arlington; I-20 in Arlington FM 157 in Arlington
- CW end: SH 360 in Arlington

Green Oaks Boulevard is a 22.7-mile-long (36.5 km) loop road, located almost entirely in the city of Arlington, in the U.S. state of Texas. Green Oaks Boulevard creates a loop around Arlington, traveling from State Highway 360 (SH 360) at Kingswood Boulevard, then runs west, north, and east back to SH 360 at Carrier Parkway, creating a backwards c shape. The highway is the only loop in the city of Arlington.

The road gives citizens of Arlington access to SH 360, Interstate 20 (I-20), and I-30, as well as several smaller state-designated highways. The street gives access to several schools and parks, as well as Arlington Municipal Airport.

== Route description ==
Green Oaks Boulevard begins at Texas State Highway 360's 2nd to last free exit before turning into a toll road, and the western end of Kingswood Boulevard, located in Grand Prairie, just a few feet from border of Arlington and Grand Prairie. The highway begins as a four-lane, concrete road, with a large, grassy median separating each direction. The road passes several small "strip malls", and several gas stations. The highway is known as Southeast Green Oaks Boulevard at this point, but is usually abbreviated to just SE Green Oaks Boulevard (This is shown on the exit from SH 360). The highway passes a small park, and a large neighborhood, before intersecting with New York Avenue, and passing a small animal hospital, and several small restaurants. The route continues with large neighborhoods on either side of it, before intersecting with South Collins Street, which gives access to the one-runway, Arlington Municipal Airport. Green Oaks passes through a park for a short period of time, before passing the Arlington Animal Shelter, and the Arlington Public Library-Southeast Branch. The roadway continues through a large neighborhood, and passes the Ferguson Education Center. The road passes through a few large neighborhoods, before intersecting with Matlock Road, and passing several fast-food restaurants, and a large baptist church. At this point it becomes Southwest Green Oaks Boulevard, and continues in a westerly direction. It intersects Farm to Market Road 157 at South Cooper Street, then curves northwestward to cross Interstate 20 after a couple more miles. Here it becomes West Green Oaks Boulevard, and it curves to the north, staying about a half mile east of the shore of Lake Arlington. It then crosses Texas State Highway Spur 303 and Texas State Highway 180 (former US 80) in quick succession, having an intersection with the former and an interchange with the latter.

Just on the south side of the interchange with SH 180 are a set of rail tracks that form a border with Fort Worth, such that when Green Oaks Boulevard crosses them, it changes cities and names. The street continues in eastern Fort Worth as Dottie Lynn Parkway, then Eastchase Parkway, and Meadowbrook Boulevard, before finally crossing back into Arlington and becoming Northwest Green Oaks Boulevard at Randol Mill Road. Immediately after this intersection, the road crosses under Interstate 30 without an interchange, due to the nearby Eastchase Parkway already doing so. It then goes through a few curves, but maintains a generally eastward direction from here. It forms the northern terminus for various streets in Arlington including Fielder, Davis, and Cooper, at which point it finally becomes Northeast Green Oaks Boulevard. A mile farther east, it crosses Farm to Market Road 157 again, this time being carried on North Collins Street. It then dips to the southeast to meet the northern end of Ballpark Way, which can take traffic to Globe Life Park, then comes back northeast, and levels out due east again, crossing Holly Brook, Arlington's city limit for a final time a few dozen yards past this, then terminating at Texas State Highway 360 again. The roadway keeps going to the east and then south as Carrier Parkway in Grand Prairie, which itself terminates almost exactly far south as the extent of the firstly described southern leg above, at West Camp Wisdom Road that is known as Sublett Road in Arlington.

== History ==
Green Oaks Boulevard has been the site for several deadly automobile accidents, due to the road's high speed limit. A series of three major accidents occurred during a short period of time in the fall of 2011. The first of the crashes occurred on August 11, 2011, when a wrong way driver collided with an 18-wheeler gas truck, and caused a large fuel spill at an intersection with the I-20 feeder road, that closed a portion of I-20 for several hours.

On April 3, 2012, a large tornado hit Green Oaks Boulevard, and caused a large portion of the Green Oaks Nursing Home to collapse, with one person hospitalized due to injuries.

== Junction list ==
The entire route is in Tarrant County.

Location	mi	km	Destinations	Notes
Arlington	0.0	0.0	SH 360 / Kingswood Boulevard	Interchange; CCW terminus; road continues east at Kingswood Boulevard
Arlington	4.4	7.1	FM 157 (South Cooper Street)	
Arlington	8.4	13.5	I-20	I-20 exit 445
Arlington	12.0	19.3	Spur 303 (West Pioneer Parkway)	
Fort Worth	12.6	20.3	SH 180 (Lancaster Avenue / Division Street) / Cooks Lane	Interchange; Green Oaks Boulevard ends, Dottie Lynn Parkway begins
Fort Worth	14.1	22.7	Meadowbrook Drive	Dottie Lynn Parkway ends; Eastchase Parkway begins
Fort Worth	14.7	23.7	To I-30 (via Eastchase Parkway north)	CW end of Eastchase Parkway overlap; Meadowbrook Lane begins
Arlington	15.8	25.4	Randol Mill Road	Meadowbrook Lane ends, Green Oaks Boulevard resumes
Arlington	20.2	32.5	FM 157 (North Collins Street)	
Arlington	22.7	36.5	SH 360 / West Carrier Parkway	Interchange; CW terminus; road continues east as Carrier Parkway
1.000 mi = 1.609 km; 1.000 km = 0.621 mi: Concurrency terminus; Route transition
