= Lynn Creek =

Lynn Creek may refer to:

- Lynn Creek (Wisconsin)
- Lynn Creek (Texas)
