= Six Flags Mall =

Defunct shopping center in Arlington, Texas

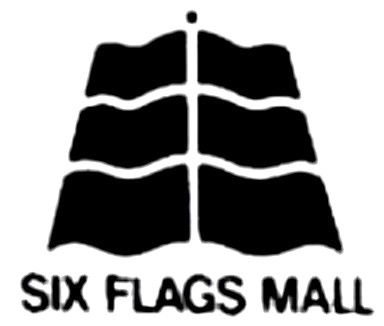

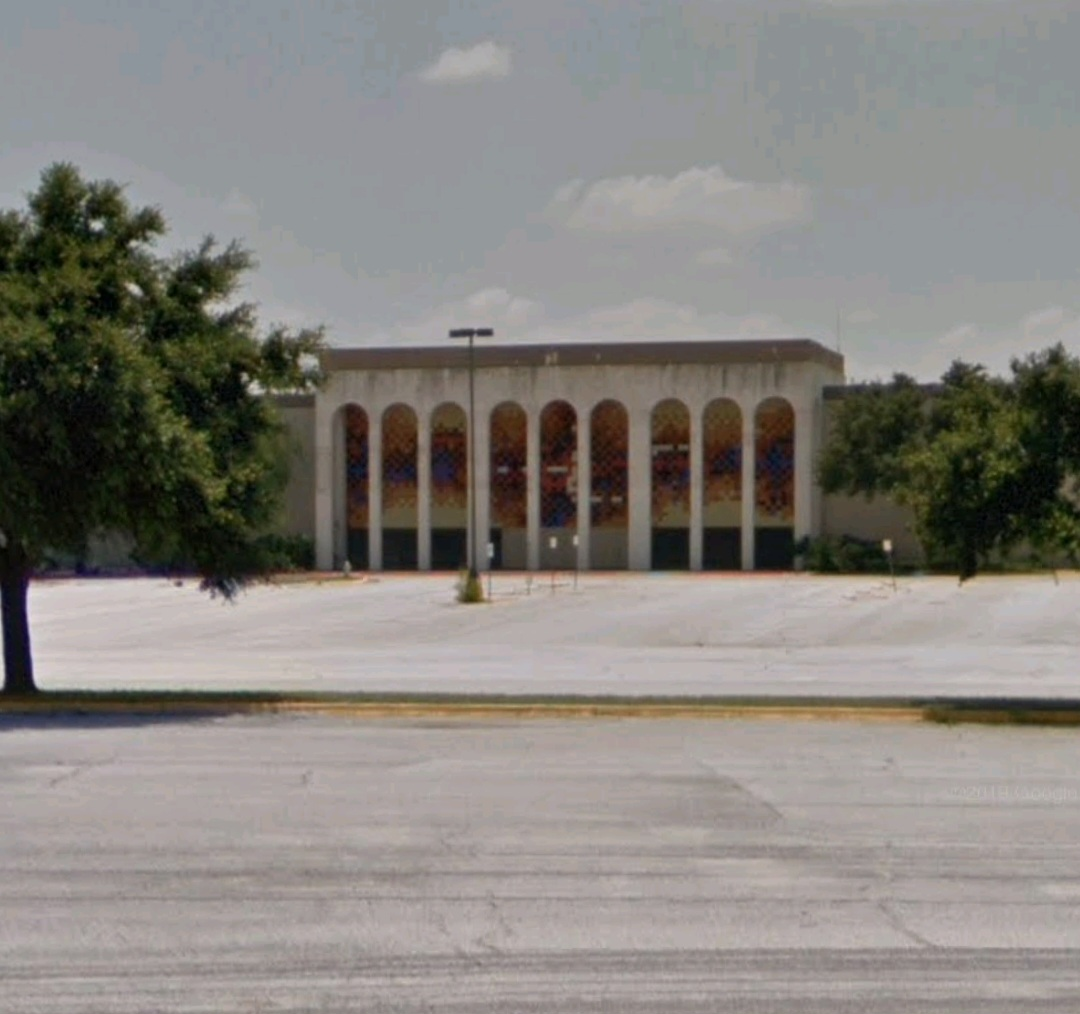
- Former Sanger Harris Department Store
- Location: Arlington, Texas, United States
- Coordinates: 32.741779°N 97.057616°W
- Address: 2915 E Division St
- Opened: August 5, 1970; 56 years ago
- Closed: February 2016
- Developer: Monumental Properties Trust
- Owner: G.L. "Buck" Harris
- Num. of stores: 40
- Num. of anchor tenants: 0 (4 at peak)
- Floor area: 1,049,000 sq ft (97,500 m^{2})
- Floors: 1

Six Flags Mall was a shopping mall that opened in August 1970 in Arlington, Texas. Arlington's first enclosed shopping center, it was named after the nearby Six Flags Over Texas theme park. When it opened, it was the largest shopping center in Tarrant County and the area's first regional shopping facility. A new owner acquired roughly one-third of the mall in December 2012 and announced plans to redevelop it as a Hispanic-oriented shopping mall called "Plaza Central" and, after resolving legal issues, reopened in October 2014, but closed again in February 2016. Demolition began in summer of 2016, but was slowed by a lawsuit filed by Cinemark. Two separate two-alarm fires occurred on February 6 and March 2 during demolition. The site was rebuilt as industrial space to accommodate suppliers to the GM auto assembly plant.

== History ==
Six Flags Mall opened in August 1970 at 2831 East Division Street (SH 180) and SH 360 in Arlington, Texas, between Fort Worth and Dallas. The mall flourished through the 1980s until The Parks at Arlington, a new regional mall, opened in South Arlington in 1988. It struggled into the 1990s; the JCPenney anchor store closed in 1997.

=== Decline ===
Both Dillard's and Sears closed in 2002. Foley's (originally a Sanger-Harris location), the fourth and final anchor, closed in January 2005, but the Dillard's anchor reopened as Dillard's Clearance Center in March 2005 after the closure of Forum 303 Mall.

By 2008 when the mall fell into foreclosure, only a dozen stores remained in its interior. When the property was placed up for auction in December 2011, the only remaining stores were the Dillard's Clearance Center and a Cinemark movie theater named Cinemark Tinseltown 9 which showed first-run movies at bargain rates. As of January 2012, American Motorcycle Trading Co. continues to operate on one of the out-lots.

=== End of the mall ===
In early December 2012, private investor G.L. "Buck" Harris purchased the former JCPenney anchor store and announced plans to redevelop it into a Hispanic-oriented shopping center named Plaza Central. He revealed plans to bring new tenants into the mall and return it to profitability over the following two years then donate the property to Youth With A Mission, a Christian outreach organization. However, the project was put on hold due to zoning issues with the City of Arlington; Harris filed a lawsuit in federal court against the city. On September 20, 2013, the Arlington Planning and Zoning Commission approved plans to overhaul the 22.5 acre property. The mall reopened as Plaza Central in October 2014, but closed a year-and-a-half later. Demolition began in 2016; the mall was completely demolished by mid-year 2017, around which time the city announced that the property would become an automobile parts supplier park to serve the nearby GM Arlington Assembly plant.

== See also ==
- Dead mall
- List of shopping malls in the Dallas/Fort Worth Metroplex
