= Forum 303 Mall =

Former shopping center in Texas, United States

Forum 303
- Location: Arlington, Texas, United States
- Coordinates: 32.711°N 97.057°W
- Opened: 1970
- Closed: 2006 (demolished September 2007)
- Developer: Triyar Co.
- Owner: Triyar Co.
- Floor area: 875,000 sq ft (81,300 m^{2})
- Floors: 1

Forum 303 Mall was a shopping mall built at Pioneer Parkway (Spur 303) and SH 360 in Arlington, Texas in the Mid-Cities between Fort Worth and Dallas. The 800,000-square-foot (74,000 m^{2}) complex was dedicated September 19, 1970. Interesting features of it was that it included a public ice skating rink, and a public amphitheater in the lower level. During the 1970s many local and national acts, such as Roy Clark, performed there.

It was converted to an indoor bazaar/flea market venue and renamed Festival Marketplace in 1998, but that concept failed to increase mall traffic. Air-conditioner problems and competition with Six Flags Mall, The Parks at Arlington, and Traders Village contributed to its 2006 demise.

Demolition of it started in September 2007. The site has been rebuilt as a business park called Pioneer 360 Business Center.

== Former anchors ==
- Leonard's (acquired by Dillard's in March 1974) [239,000 square feet, with freestanding Auto Center]
- Dillard's (Converted to Dillard's Clearance Center)
- Dillard's Clearance Center (moved to Six Flags Mall in 2005)
- Montgomery Ward (closed 2001) [151,000 square feet, with freestanding Auto Center]
- Service Merchandise (closed 1999)
- AMC Theatres

== See also ==
- Dead mall
