= International Parkway =

Freeway serving Dallas Fort Worth International Airport

International Parkway
- State Highway Spur 97
- International Parkway highlighted in red

Route information
- Maintained by TxDOT and DFW
- Length: 7.528 mi (12.115 km) 0.589 miles (0.948 km) as Spur 97; 6.939 miles (11.167 km) without designation
- Existed: September 21, 1973–present

Major junctions
- South end: SH 183 / SH 360 in Fort Worth
- North end: I-635 / SH 121 / SH 114 in Grapevine

Location
- Country: United States
- State: Texas
- Counties: Tarrant

Highway system
- Highways in Texas; Interstate; US; State; Former; Toll; Loops; Spurs; FM/RM; Park; Rec
← SH 96	Spur 97	→ SH 98

International Parkway is a north–south freeway in the Dallas–Fort Worth metroplex that provides access to Dallas/Fort Worth International Airport (DFW). The segment between its southern terminus at SH 183 and SH 360 and the airport's south toll plaza is designated as State Highway Spur 97. The roadway operates with a toll system integrated with airport entry and parking.

== Route description ==
International Parkway begins at an interchange with SH 183 and SH 360 southwest of DFW Airport. It initially runs eastward along ramps parallel to SH 183 before turning north as Spur 97. The Spur 97 designation ends south of the airport property near the south toll plaza.

Within the airport, the roadway continues north between the terminal areas. North of the terminals, it passes through a second toll plaza before reaching an interchange with I-635, SH 114, and SH 121.

== History ==
Spur 97 was designated on May 9, 1940, along a route from SH 77 to Marietta in Cass County as a renumbering of SH 245. This designation was cancelled on September 26, 1945, when the route became part of FM 250.

The Spur 97 designation was reassigned on March 31, 1965, to a route from IH 610 and SH 225 to Lawndale Avenue in Houston. On April 2, 1969, this segment was incorporated into SH 225 following its westward extension, while the former alignment of SH 225 between SH 35 and IH 610 became part of I-610.

International Parkway opened to traffic on September 21, 1973. The current Spur 97 designation for the roadway dates to July 30, 1974.

== Tolls ==
All vehicles entering International Parkway pay a toll, including those accessing airport terminals. Tolls are collected at entry and exit plazas, with charges assessed upon exit. Payment is accepted by credit or debit card or through TollTag. Rates are based on the time between entry and exit and correspond to the parking fees charged at terminal parking areas.

The high toll rate for vehicles spending less than 8 minutes on airport property is aimed at discouraging pass-through traffic using the highway as a shortcut.

At-grade service roads parallel to International Parkway provide a toll-free route across airport property but do not connect to the terminal areas.

Toll rates, as of November 2026
Time	Rate
Less than 8 minutes	$12
8 minutes to 30 minutes	$1
30 minutes to 2 hours	$3
2 hours to 4 hours	$5
4 hours to 6 hours	$16
6 hours to 24 hours	$37

== Exit list ==
The entire route is in Tarrant County. All exits are unnumbered.

Location	mi	km	Destinations	Notes
Fort Worth	0.0	0.0	SH 183 / SH 360 – Irving, Dallas, Ft Worth, Grand Prairie, Arlington	
Euless	1.5	2.4	Rental Car Drive – Rental Cars	No direct southbound exit or northbound entrance (vehicles use Service Road)
Euless	1.8	2.9	Service Road / Airfield Drive – Remote South Parking, Corporate Aviation	
Euless	2.6	4.2	South Toll Plaza	
Grapevine	4.3	6.9	Express South Parking	
Grapevine	4.7	7.6	Terminal E	
Grapevine	5.1	8.2	Terminal D, Grand Hyatt	
Grapevine	5.2	8.4	Terminal C, Hyatt Regency	
Grapevine	5.5	8.9	Terminal B	
Grapevine	5.7	9.2	Terminal A	
Grapevine	6.5	10.5	Express North Parking	
Grapevine	6.9	11.1	North Toll Plaza	
Grapevine	7.1	11.4	Airfield Drive – Remote North Parking	Northbound exit and southbound entrance
Grapevine	7.5	12.1	I-635 east / SH 114 / SH 121 south – Grapevine, Ft Worth, Dallas	Western terminus of I-635, exit 36A to Spur 97 southbound & 36B to Bass Pro Drive
Grapevine	7.5	12.1	SH 121 north to Sam Rayburn Tollway – McKinney	Continues north to Sam Rayburn Tollway
1.000 mi = 1.609 km; 1.000 km = 0.621 mi: Incomplete access; Tolled
