= Sublett =

Sublett may refer to:

- A variant of Sublette (surname)
- Sublett, Kentucky, a settlement in Kentucky, USA
- Sublett Range, a mountain range in the U.S. states of Idaho (~94%) and Utah (~6%)
- Sublett Creek, a creek in Northern Texas, USA
