= Lynn Creek (Texas) =

Creek in northern Texas

Coordinates: 32°37′44″N 97°02′57″W

Lynn Creek is a creek in Tarrant County, Texas. The creek rises in south Arlington, and runs to the east, through the Lynn Creek Linear Park, passing under Texas State Highway 360 before meeting Joe Pool Lake near Grand Prairie.

== History ==
The creek was named after William Lynn, a settler that had a farm in the area during the 19th Century.

== See also ==
- Rush Creek
