= Julie Stepan =

Texan professional drag racer

- Born: March 30, 1986 (age 40); Grand Prairie, Texas, U.S.

Sport Compact
- Years active: 2003–present

Julie Stepan (born March 30, 1986, in Grand Prairie, Texas) is a professional drag racer, and a media / broadcasting professional.

== Achievements and awards ==
- In 2004, she won the Subaru Easy Street female driver search at the age of 18.
- In 2005, she ended her first season with Subaru ESX winning 4 NHRA "Wally" trophies.
- In 2006, she won 6 more NHRA Wallies with Subaru ESX and ended the season as the Sport RWD Series Champion while driving a 1000 hp 2006 STI
- After Subaru and ESX parted ways she accepted a new driver spot in the Marty Ladwig Racing team for 2007.
- She is now modeling and acting in the L.A. area and doing some TV hosting gigs with ESPN.

== 2006 ==
- NHRA Sport RWD CHAMPION
