= The Parks Mall at Arlington =

Shopping mall in Arlington, Texas, U.S.

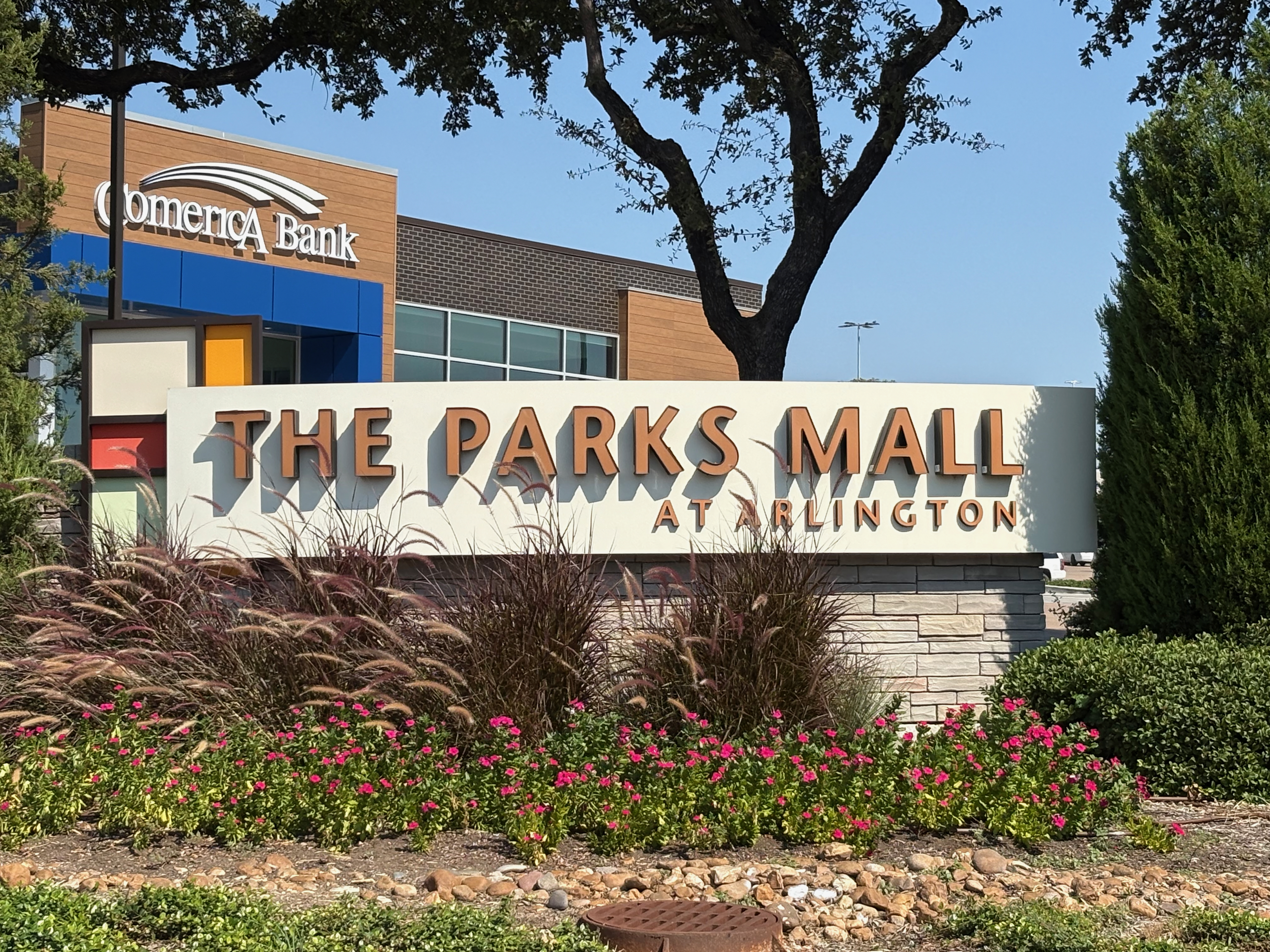
- Entrance Sign at The Parks Mall
- Location: Arlington, Texas, United Stares
- Coordinates: 32.6800°N 97.1295°W
- Address: 3811 South Cooper Street
- Opened: February 24, 1988; 38 years ago
- Developer: Homart Development Company
- Manager: GGP
- Owner: GGP (51%); CBRE Group (49%)
- Num. of stores: 180
- Num. of anchor tenants: 8
- Floor area: 1,510,000 square feet (140,000 m^{2})
- Floors: 2 (3 in Dillard's, 4 in Parking Garage outside J. C. Penney)
- Website: www.theparksmallarlington.com

The Parks Mall at Arlington (or simply Parks Mall) is a super-regional shopping mall in Arlington, Texas, a suburb in the Dallas–Fort Worth metroplex. The mall is located in southern Arlington at the intersection of Interstate 20 and South Cooper Street (FM 157).

Opened in 1988, the mall is the only indoor shopping center in Arlington following the closure of Forum 303 Mall and Six Flags Mall. At 1.5 million square feet (140,000 m^{2}), it is the third-largest indoor mall in Tarrant County, behind only Grapevine Mills and North East Mall.

The mall is anchored by Dillard's, JCPenney, Macy's, Dick's House of Sport, Round One, Nordstrom Rack, and an 18-screen AMC multiplex, with one additional vacant anchor building. The mall also features an indoor ice rink.

== History ==
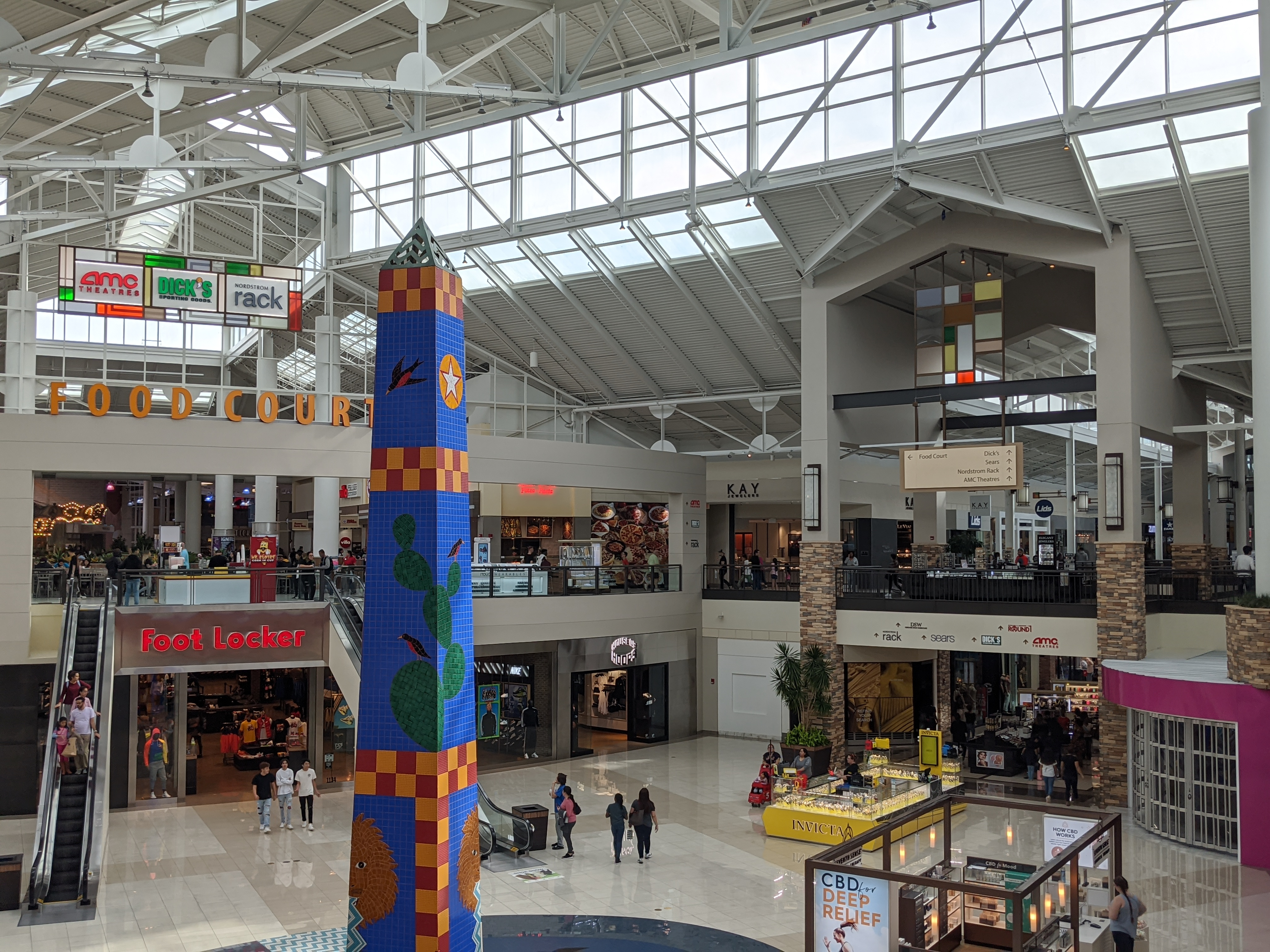
Main atrium. The obelisk is based on a fountain in Arlington's historic downtown.

Construction of the Parks Mall began in 1985, with constructing ramping up in 1986 with a $21 million building permit for the mall. It officially opened on February 24, 1988.

The mall was developed by Homart Development Company and Herring Marathon. The original anchor stores were Dillard's, Mervyn's, and Sears.

In 1989, The Parks was expanded and Houston-based Foley's (now Macy's) was added as the fourth anchor store. Five years later, JCPenney was added as the fifth anchor store.

It expanded again in 2002 with a new wing featuring Galyan's (now Dick's Sporting Goods) and The Great Indoors. The Great Indoors closed in 2003 and the space was taken over by Steve & Barry's in the mid-2000s.

When Mervyns closed in 2006, it was replaced with several new tenants, including Barnes & Noble, The Cheesecake Factory, and Forever 21.

In 2016, the former Steve and Barry’s got taken over by Round1 Amusement.

On July 11, 2020, it was announced that Sears would be closing as part of a plan to close 28 stores nationwide. It was reopened in August 2021 as Sears Hometown Inc. The Sears Hometown closed some time after.

Forever 21 closed in 2025. The space was converted into the Irish fashion retailer Primark which announced they would open in summer 2026. The new Primark store became the third store in the Dallas-Fort Worth metropolitan area. Primark opened on June 25, 2026.

On June 28, 2023, it was announced that a Dick’s House of Sports will be replacing the former Sears at the mall. The store opened to the public on June 26, 2026. The space Dick's Sporting Goods currently occupies will be converted into one or more tenants by 2030.

== See also ==
- List of shopping malls in Texas
