= Sublett Creek =

Creek in northern Texas

Location
- Country: United States

Physical characteristics
- Mouth
  - location: Rush Creek
  - coordinates: 32°38′50″N 97°09′53″W

Sublett Creek is a creek in Tarrant County, Texas. The creek rises in South Arlington, flowing north-east through the Sublett Creek Linear Park where it meets Rush Creek.

== Sublett Creek Linear Park ==
Sublett Creek Linear Park is a 26.9 acre park in Arlington. The park is connected to the Rush Creek Linear Park.

== See also ==
- Lynn Creek
