= Grand Central Park =

Facility in Grand Prairie, Texas, United States

Coordinates: 32°42′02″N 97°01′48″W

Grand Central Park (also known as The EpicCentral) is an American property in Grand Prairie, Texas. The establishment consists of "The Summit", "The Epic", "Epic Waters" and "PlayGrand Adventures".

== The Summit ==
The Summit is a fitness facility designed for people over 50 years of age.

== Epic Waters ==
Epic Waters is an indoor water park with a retractable roof.

== PlayGrand Adventures ==
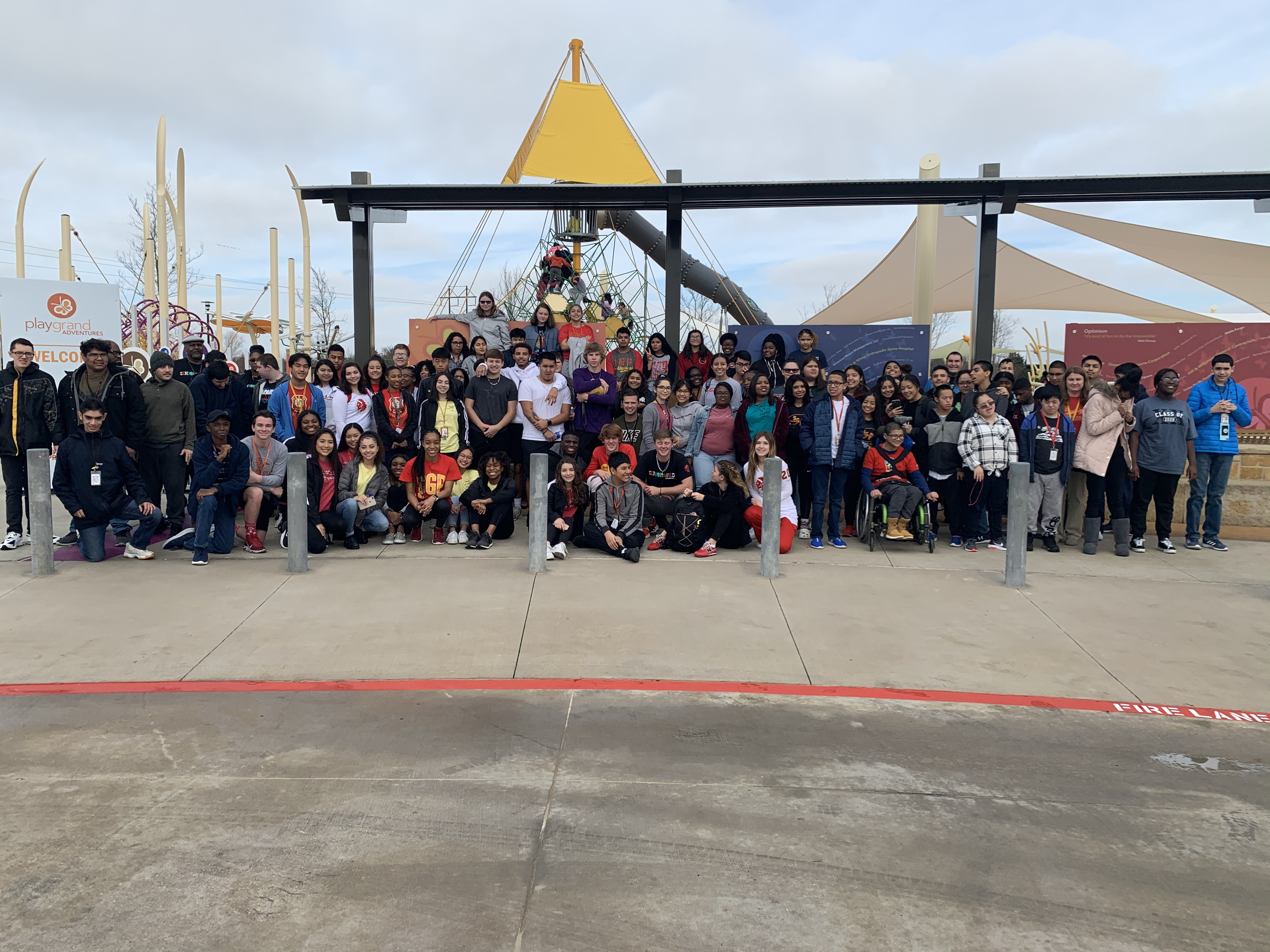
A group of high schoolers went on a trip to PlayGrand Adventures before grand opening

PlayGrand Adventures is simply the modern playground
