= Rush Creek (Texas) =

Creek in northern Texas

Location
- Country: United States

Physical characteristics
- Mouth
  - location: Village Creek
  - coordinates: 32°44′38″N 97°09′41″W
- Length: 12 mi (19 km)

Rush Creek is a creek in Tarrant County, Texas. The creek rises near Mansfield and flows for twelve miles. The creek meets Village Creek to the west of Arlington.

== Rush Creek Linear Park ==
Rush Creek Linear Park is a 116-acre park in Arlington. The park is split into two sections, with the southern section being located to the east of U.S. Route 287, and the northern section located to the south of Texas State Highway 303 in West Arlington. Sublett Creek meets Rush Creek in the southern section of the park.

== See also ==
- Lynn Creek
