= Rush Creek (Missouri River tributary) =

Stream in Clay County, Missouri, U.S.

Coordinates: 39°12′21″N 94°19′18″W

Rush Creek is a stream in Clay County in the U.S. state of Missouri. It is a tributary of the Missouri River.

According to the State Historical Society of Missouri, Lewis and Clark may have described Rush Creek on their expedition.

== See also ==
- List of rivers of Missouri
