= Village Creek (Tarrant County) Texas =

Coordinates: 32°46′34″N 97°09′00″W

Village Creek is a tributary creek of the West Fork of the Trinity River in Tarrant and Johnson County, Texas, United States. It is the main inflow of Lake Arlington. It is approximately 23 miles (37 km) long. Its watershed is approximately 143 square miles (370 km^{2}).

== History ==
On 24 May 1841, the "Battle of Village Creek" occurred, in which a group of seventy men (including some Texas Rangers) under the command of Edward H. Tarrant, attacked three American Indian encampments along the creek. A monument to this battle was erected at the nearby town of Handley in 1936.

The work Springs of Texas notes that Tarrant attacked the communities while the Indian men were out hunting buffalo, and massacred women and children there.

== Course ==
Its headwaters are in northern Johnson County, near Heiney Ranch Rd and FM 802 in Burleson. Flowing in a generally northerly direction through Burleson, it is joined by Shannon Creek from the west in Chisenhall Park, and turns northeasterly. Booger Creek joins from the west near I-35W and E Renfro Street. Quil Miller Creek flows in near the Johnson and Tarrant County line. The creek flows northward and is joined from the west by Deer Creek. Continuing north and northeast it enters Timberview Park from the south. Farther north it flows through Kennedale and enters Lake Arlington from the south just north of I-20 in Fort Worth. The last portion flows from Lake Arlington northerly through Village Creek Historical Area (and park) in Arlington, site of a battle. Following NW Green Oaks road it converges with the West Fork of the Trinity River.

== Tributaries ==
- Shannon Creek
- Booger Creek
- Quil Miller Creek
- Deer Creek
- Rush Creek

== See also ==
- List of rivers of Texas
