= Texas State Highway Spur 303 =

State highway in Texas

State Highway Spur 303
- Pioneer Parkway

Route information
- Maintained by TxDOT
- Length: 17.357 mi (27.933 km)
- Existed: April 1, 1956–present

Major junctions
- West end: I-820 in Fort Worth
- East end: Loop 12 in Dallas

Location
- Country: United States
- State: Texas

Highway system
- Highways in Texas; Interstate; US; State; Former; Toll; Loops; Spurs; FM/RM; Park; Rec
| ← Spur 302 | → Loop 304 |

Spur 303 is a state highway between Interstate 820 in Fort Worth, and Duncanville Road in Dallas. At 17.4 miles (28.0 km) in length, it is Texas' longest highway spur.

The portion in Dallas between Loop 12 and Mountain Creek Parkway (near Dallas Baptist University) is officially designated Kiest Boulevard, and it also passes over the Mountain Creek Lake Bridge (however, the stretch between Mountain Creek Parkway and SE 14th Street, which is the location of the bridge, is not part of the Spur). (Note: The minute order notes the stretch ending at Florina Road; this road was later renamed Mountain Creek Parkway.) The portion in Arlington and Grand Prairie is designated Pioneer Parkway. The portion in Fort Worth is designated Rosedale Street and ends at Interstate 820.

== Route description ==
Spur 303 begins at an interchange at I-820 in Fort Worth and heads east as Rosedale Street. It runs by SH 180 as it passes by Lake Arlington. It becomes Pioneer Parkway due north of Lake Arlington and remains so as it passes between Pantego and Dalworthington Gardens. The highway then intersects FM 157 (Cooper Street) and travels through the south side of Arlington, passing the Ben Thanh Plaza and Arlington ISD Dan Dipert Career and Technical Center. Spur 303 then interchanges with SH 360 at a parclo interchange and then comes across the President George Bush Turnpike. SH 161 runs on both sides of the toll road and gives Spur 303 limited access to the turnpike. The route then intersects FM 1382 before it approaches Mountain Creek Lake and crosses over it by the Mountain Creek Lake Bridge (maintained by the North Texas Tollway Authority [NTTA]). It becomes Kiest Boulevard as it intersects Mountain Creek Parkway and it passes by Dallas Baptist University before interchanging with Spur 408. The route then reaches its eastern terminus at Loop 12 outside Dallas.

== History ==
Spur 303 was designated on February 23, 1956, from Rosedale Street to SH 360. On May 23, 1956, it was extended east to FM 1382. On March 7, 1969, Spur 303 was extended east to Loop 12. On July 24, 1978, the section from 14th Street to Florina Drive and Kiest Boulevard was cancelled.

== Junction list ==
| County | Location | mi | km | Destinations | Notes |
|---|---|---|---|---|---|
| Tarrant | Fort Worth | 0.00 | 0.00 | I-820 – Fort Worth | Western terminus |
| Tarrant | Arlington | 6.7 | 10.8 | FM 157 (Cooper Street) – UTA | |
| Tarrant | Arlington | 9.8 | 15.8 | SH 360 | Interchange |
| Dallas | Grand Prairie | 12.0 | 19.3 | Pres. George Bush Turnpike | |
| Dallas | Grand Prairie | 13.9 | 22.4 | FM 1382 (Belt Line Road) | |
| Dallas | Dallas | 14.9 | 24.0 | Mountain Creek Lake Bridge over Mountain Creek Lake | |
| Dallas | Dallas | 15.6 | 25.1 | Spur 408 (Patriot Parkway) | |
| Dallas | Dallas | 17.357 | 27.933 | Loop 12 (Walton Walker Boulevard) | |
1.000 mi = 1.609 km; 1.000 km = 0.621 mi: Tolled
