= Lynn Creek (Wisconsin) =

Stream in Wisconsin, U.S.

Coordinates: 44°16′20″N 89°54′50″W

Lynn Creek is a stream in the U.S. state of Wisconsin. It is a tributary to the Wisconsin River.

Lynn Creek was named in honor of M. H. Lynn, the original owner of the site.
