= Texas State Highway 180 =

State highway in Tarrant and Dallas counties in Texas, United States

State Highway 180
- SH 180, highlighted in red

Route information
- Maintained by TxDOT
- Length: 30.4 mi (48.9 km)
- Existed: 1991–present

Major junctions
- West end: I-35W in Fort Worth
- US 287 in Fort Worth; I-820 in Fort Worth; SH 360 in Arlington
- East end: Loop 12 in Dallas

Location
- Country: United States
- State: Texas
- Counties: Tarrant, Dallas

Highway system
- Highways in Texas; Interstate; US; State; Former; Toll; Loops; Spurs; FM/RM; Park; Rec
← US 180	→ US 181

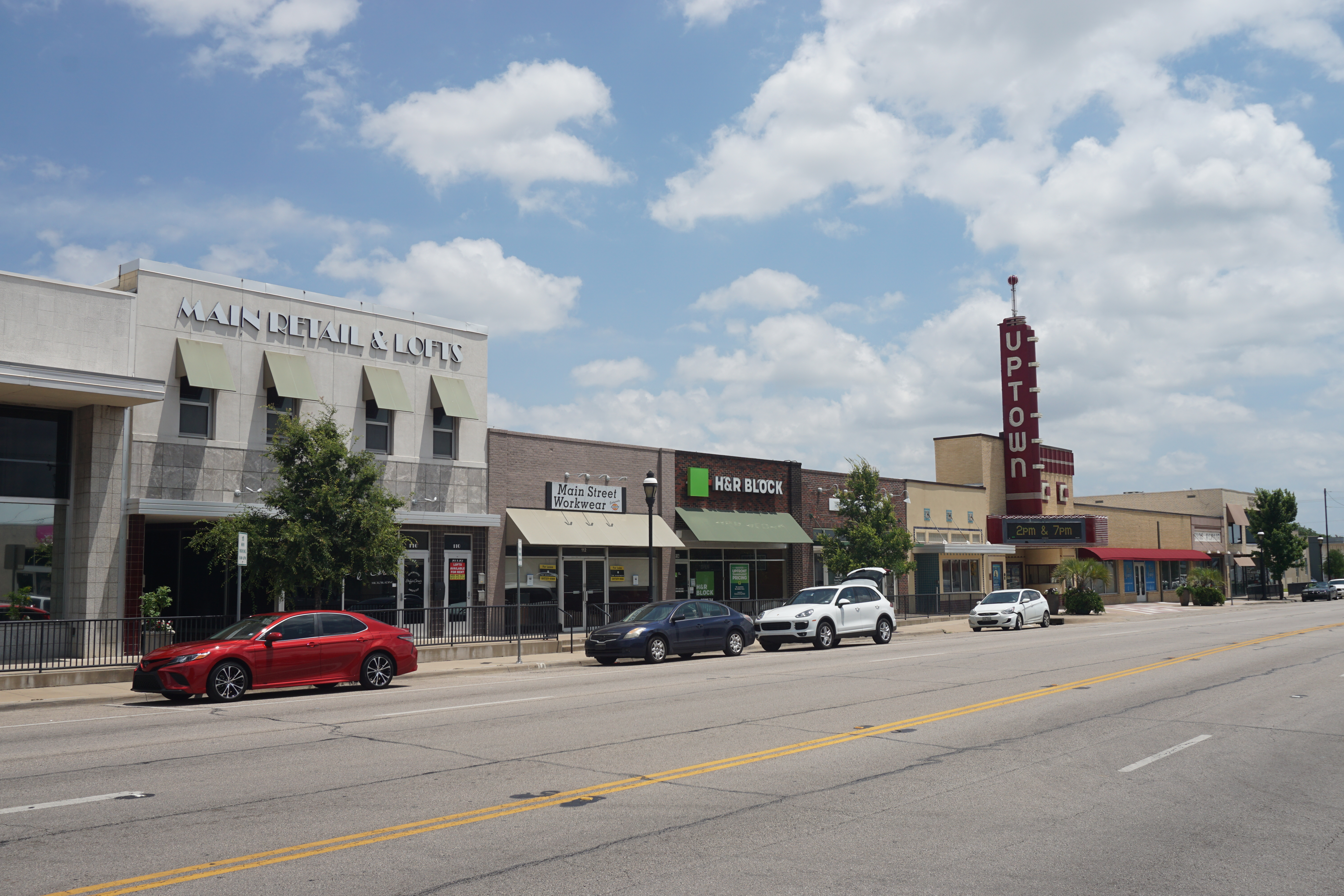
State Highway 180 as Main Street in Grand Prairie

State Highway 180 (SH 180) is a highway that runs through Tarrant County and Dallas County in Texas (USA) between Interstate 35W in Fort Worth, running east to Loop 12 in Dallas. From Loop 12 in Dallas to Interstate 35W in Fort Worth, State Highway 180 follows the old routing of U.S. Route 80. Signage still shows the part from Loop 12 to Beckley Boulevard as SH-180 although it had been removed from the state system in 2014.

== Route description ==
The entire route runs no more than a few miles south parallel of the former Dallas-Fort Worth Turnpike (now Interstate 30), but does not intersect with it at any point.

The highway begins as Lancaster Avenue from Interstate 35W just southeast of downtown Fort Worth.

Entering Arlington, it becomes Division Street, and passes just south of AT&T Stadium and Globe Life Field.

After entering Grand Prairie, it becomes Main Street, passing through mainly older commercial buildings and the city's downtown area.

When it enters Dallas, it becomes Davis Street to Loop 12.

== History ==
SH 180 was previously designated on November 30, 1932 from Annona north to then-SH 5. This highway was SH 5A before March 19, 1930, and was erroneously omitted from the March 19, 1930 state highway log. SH 180 was decommissioned on January 25, 1938. This was redesignated as SH 5 Spur on February 20, 1939, which was redesignated as Spur 23 on September 26, 1939, and FM 44 on May 19, 1942.

The current SH 180 was designated on August 28, 1991 when US 80 was decommissioned west of Mesquite. On October 30, 2014, the section of SH 180 from Loop 12 to Interstate 35E was removed from the state highway system and returned to the city of Dallas.

== Junction list ==
County	Location	mi	km	Destinations	Notes
Tarrant	Fort Worth	0.0	0.0	I-35W – Fort Worth, Waco	
Tarrant	Fort Worth	0.7	1.1	US 287 to I-30 west – Downtown	Interchange
Tarrant	Fort Worth	1.8	2.9	Beach Street	Interchange
Tarrant	Fort Worth	5.6– 5.8	9.0– 9.3	I-820	I-820 exits 30A-B
Tarrant	Fort Worth	8.3	13.4	Dottie Lynn Parkway / Green Oaks Boulevard, Cooks Lane	Interchange
Tarrant	Arlington	11.3	18.2	Fielder Road	Interchange
Tarrant	Arlington	15.2– 15.5	24.5– 24.9	SH 360	Interchange
Dallas	Grand Prairie	17.9	28.8	Pres. George Bush Turnpike	
Dallas	Grand Prairie	19.4– 19.5	31.2– 31.4	FM 1382 south (Belt Line Road) to I-30 / SE 9th Street	Interchange
Dallas	Dallas	23.8– 24.0	38.3– 38.6	Loop 12 (Walton Walker Boulevard)	Interchange
1.000 mi = 1.609 km; 1.000 km = 0.621 mi
