= Grand Prairie, Texas =

City in the United States

- City
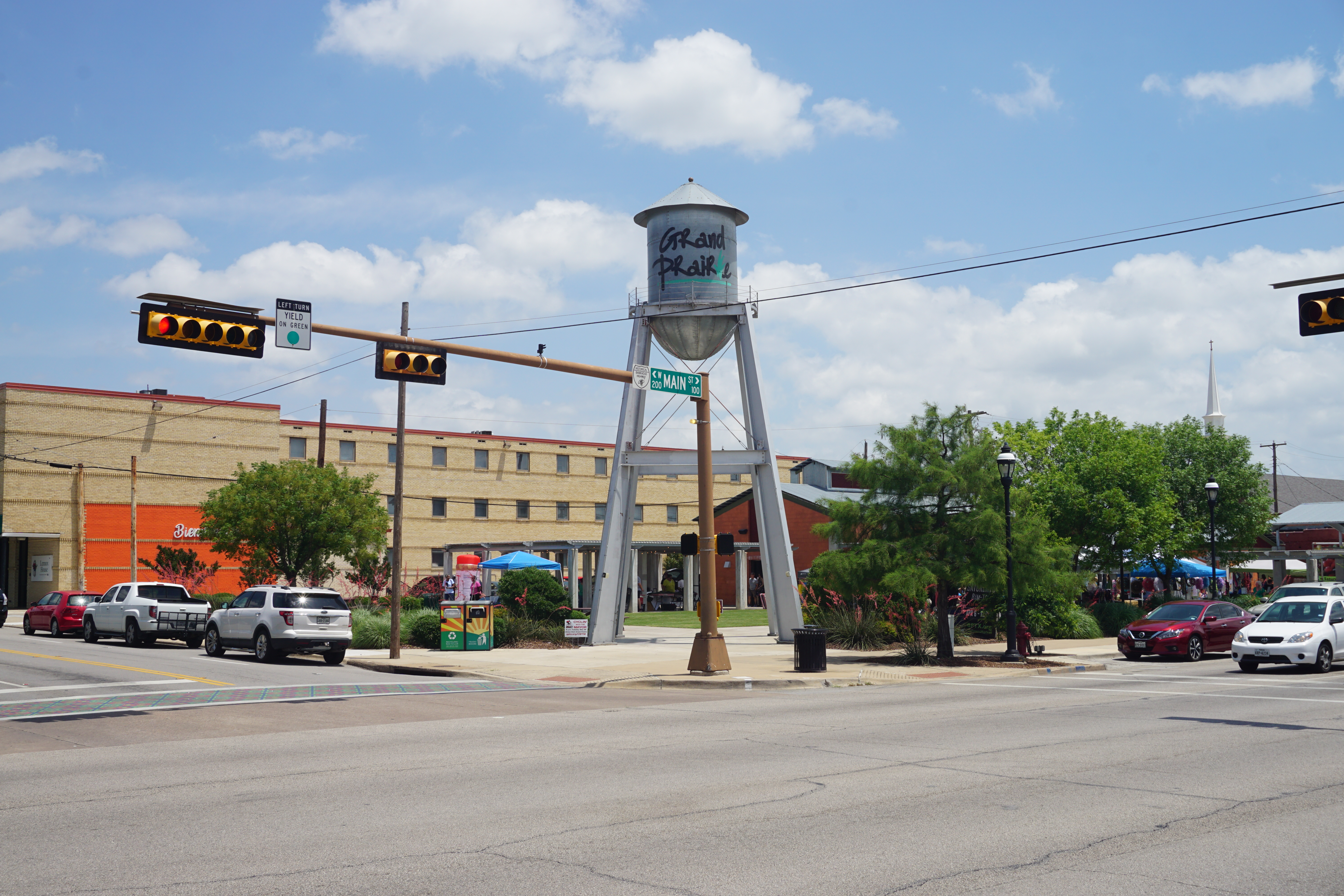
- Market Square in 2019

- Logo
- Nickname: "G.P." "GPTX"
- Location of Grand Prairie in Dallas County, Texas

- Location in the contiguous United States
- Coordinates: 32°42′55″N 96°57′58″W
- Country: United States
- State: Texas
- Counties: Dallas, Tarrant, Ellis, Johnson
- Incorporated as Dechman: 1863; 163 years ago
- Incorporated as Grand Prairie: 1909; 117 years ago

Government
  - Type: Council-Manager
  - Mayor: Ron Jensen

Area
  - City: 81.46 sq mi (210.99 km^{2})
  - Land: 72.57 sq mi (187.95 km^{2})
  - Water: 8.90 sq mi (23.05 km^{2})
- Elevation: 528 ft (161 m)

Population (2020)
  - City: 196,100
  - Rank: (US: 122nd)
  - Density: 2,702/sq mi (1,043/km^{2})
  - Urban: 5,121,892 (6th)
  - Metro: 6,810,913 (4th)
  - Demonym: Grand Prairian
- Time zone: UTC−6 (CST)
  - Summer (DST): UTC−5 (CDT)
- ZIP codes: 75050-75054
- Area codes: 682, 817 214, 469, 945, 972
- FIPS code: 48-30464
- GNIS feature ID: 2410632
- Website: www.gptx.org

Grand Prairie is a city in the U.S. state of Texas, located in Dallas, Tarrant, and Ellis counties with a small part extending into Johnson county. It is part of the Mid-Cities region in the Dallas–Fort Worth metroplex. It had a population of 175,396 according to the 2010 census, making it the fifteenth most populous city in the state. Remaining the 15th-most populous city in Texas, the 2020 census reported a population of 196,100.

== History ==
The city of Grand Prairie was first established as Dechman by Alexander McRae Dechman in 1863. He based the name of the town on Big Prairie, Ohio. Prior to then, he resided in Young County near Fort Belknap. The 1860 U.S. Federal Census—Slave Schedules shows an A McR Dechman as having four slaves, ages 50, 25, 37 and 10. Dechman learned that he could trade his oxen and wagons for land in Dallas County. In 1863, Dechman bought 239.5 acres (96.9 ha) of land on the eastern side of the Trinity River and 100 acres (40 ha) of timber land on the west side of the river for a broken-down wagon, oxen team and US$200 in Confederate money. He tried to establish a home on the property, but ran into difficulties, so he returned to his family in Birdville before joining in the Civil War. In 1867, Dechman filed a town plat with Dallas County, consisting of 50 acres (20 ha).

After the war, Dechman returned to Birdville for two years before selling that farm in 1867 and moving to Houston, where yellow fever broke out, causing the family to settle in Bryan. In 1876, Dechman traded half his "prairie" property to the T&P Railroad to ensure the railroad came through the town. The railroad named the depot "Dechman", prompting its namesake to relocate his home from Bryan to Dechman. His son Alexander had been living in Dechman and operating a trading post and farm. The first church in the area was the Good Hope Cumberland Sabbath School, established in 1870 by Rev. Andrew Hayter. The church was later renamed West Fork United Presbyterian Church and remains an active church.

The first U.S. post office opened in 1877 under the name "Deckman" rather than "Dechman", because the U.S. Postal Service could not read the writing on the form completed to open the post office. Later that same year, after the Postal Service had adopted the "Deckman" name, confusion resulted from the T&P Railroad designation "Grand Prairie". This name was based on maps drawn from around 1850 through 1858 that labeled the area between Dallas and Fort Worth "the grand prairie of Texas". In order to alleviate the confusion, the Postal Service named the post office "Grand Prairie".

The town of Grand Prairie was eventually incorporated as a city in 1909. During World War I and since, Grand Prairie has had a long history with the defense and aviation industry. While the present-day Vought plant on Jefferson Avenue is part of a small strip within the Dallas city limits, it was originally in Grand Prairie. During World War II, the North American Aviation Plant B produced the Consolidated B-24 Liberator and the P-51C and K Mustang variants. After the war, Vought Aircraft took over the plant. This later became Ling-Temco-Vought (LTV), then eventually returned to the Vought moniker. The plant was the production site for the F-8 Crusader and the A-7 Corsair II aircraft of the 1950–1989 time period. The LTV Missile and Space division produced missiles such as the Scout and MLRS. This division was eventually sold to Lockheed Martin, which continues to operate in Grand Prairie. Grand Prairie was also the North American headquarters for Aérospatiale Helicopter. This company eventually became Airbus Helicopters, Inc., the U.S. subsidiary of Airbus Helicopters.

In 1953, the mayor and city council of Grand Prairie attempted to annex nearly 70 square miles (180 km^{2}) of then-unincorporated and largely undeveloped land in southern Dallas and Tarrant counties. Vehement debate ensued, and the legal pressure from cities such as Arlington, Duncanville and Irving wound up overturning part of the annexation attempt. In 2025, the city annexed nearly 900 acres along its southern boundary to facilitate the Goodland master-planned community, which is planned to include housing, schools, parks and commercial areas.

== Geography ==
Grand Prairie is located along the border between Tarrant and Dallas counties, with a small portion extending south into Ellis County. The city is bordered by Dallas to the east, Cedar Hill and Midlothian to the southeast, Mansfield to the southwest, Arlington to the west, Fort Worth to the northwest, and Irving to the north.

According to the United States Census Bureau, the city has a total area of 81.1 square miles (210.0 km^{2}), of which 72.1 square miles (186.8 km^{2}) is land and 9.0 square miles (23.3 km^{2}), or 11.08%, is water.

The West Fork of the Trinity River and a major tributary, Johnson Creek, flow through Grand Prairie.

Grand Prairie has a long history of flooding from Johnson Creek. In the 1980s, a major Army Corps of Engineers project was begun to straighten the channel, which has reduced the damage of flooding.

=== Climate ===
Grand Prairie is part of the humid subtropical region.

Climate data for Grand Prairie 1981–2013 Normals
Month	Jan	Feb	Mar	Apr	May	Jun	Jul	Aug	Sep	Oct	Nov	Dec	Year
Record high °F (°C)	85 (29)	90 (32)	100 (38)	100 (38)	101 (38)	113 (45)	110 (43)	112 (44)	111 (44)	106 (41)	91 (33)	87 (31)	113 (45)
Mean daily maximum °F (°C)	56.6 (13.7)	60.7 (15.9)	68.0 (20.0)	75.8 (24.3)	83.4 (28.6)	90.7 (32.6)	95.5 (35.3)	96.2 (35.7)	88.5 (31.4)	78.5 (25.8)	67.6 (19.8)	57.3 (14.1)	76.6 (24.8)
Mean daily minimum °F (°C)	36.5 (2.5)	40.5 (4.7)	47.9 (8.8)	55.5 (13.1)	64.0 (17.8)	72.0 (22.2)	75.8 (24.3)	75.9 (24.4)	68.1 (20.1)	57.7 (14.3)	46.6 (8.1)	37.5 (3.1)	56.6 (13.7)
Record low °F (°C)	−2 (−19)	8 (−13)	10 (−12)	29 (−2)	39 (4)	53 (12)	58 (14)	58 (14)	42 (6)	24 (−4)	16 (−9)	1 (−17)	−2 (−19)
Average precipitation inches (mm)	2.2 (56)	2.6 (66)	2.9 (74)	3.3 (84)	5.0 (130)	4.7 (120)	2.4 (61)	2.0 (51)	2.8 (71)	4.5 (110)	2.5 (64)	2.4 (61)	37.4 (950)
Average snowfall inches (cm)	0.5 (1.3)	0.2 (0.51)	0.1 (0.25)	0 (0)	0 (0)	0 (0)	0 (0)	0 (0)	0 (0)	0 (0)	0 (0)	0.3 (0.76)	1.1 (2.8)
Average precipitation days (≥ 0.01 in)	7.4	6.6	7.5	7.2	10.2	8.0	4.8	4.9	5.4	7.5	6.7	7.2	83.4
Average snowy days (≥ 0.1 in)	0.4	0.3	0.3	0	0	0	0	0	0	0	0	0.1	1.1
Source: Weatherbase.com

== Demographics ==
Historical population
Census	Pop.	Note	%±
1910	994		—
1920	1,263		27.1%
1930	1,529		21.1%
1940	1,595		4.3%
1950	14,594		815.0%
1960	30,386		108.2%
1970	50,904		67.5%
1980	71,462		40.4%
1990	99,616		39.4%
2000	127,427		27.9%
2010	175,396		37.6%
2020	196,100		11.8%
2023 (est.)	202,134		3.1%
U.S. Decennial Census

=== Racial and ethnic composition ===
Grand Prairie city, Texas – Racial and ethnic composition Note: the US Census treats Hispanic/Latino as an ethnic category. This table excludes Latinos from the racial categories and assigns them to a separate category. Hispanics/Latinos may be of any race.
Race / Ethnicity (NH = Non-Hispanic)	Pop 2000	Pop 2010	Pop 2020	% 2000	% 2010	% 2020
White alone (NH)	60,118	51,058	39,303	47.18%	29.11%	20.04%
Black or African American alone (NH)	16,948	34,436	46,360	13.30%	19.63%	23.64%
Native American or Alaska Native alone (NH)	678	709	670	0.53%	0.40%	0.34%
Asian alone (NH)	5,574	11,329	14,778	4.37%	6.46%	7.54%
Native Hawaiian or Pacific Islander alone (NH)	59	129	172	0.05%	0.07%	0.09%
Other race alone (NH)	157	244	792	0.12%	0.14%	0.40%
Mixed race or Multiracial (NH)	1,855	2,598	5,276	1.46%	1.48%	2.69%
Hispanic or Latino (any race)	42,038	74,893	88,749	32.99%	42.70%	45.26%
Total	127,427	175,396	196,100	100.00%	100.00%	100.00%

=== 2020 census ===
As of the 2020 census, Grand Prairie had a population of 196,100 and a median age of 33.7 years. 27.2% of residents were under the age of 18 and 9.8% of residents were 65 years of age or older. For every 100 females there were 95.0 males, and for every 100 females age 18 and over there were 92.5 males age 18 and over.

As of the 2020 census, 99.8% of residents lived in urban areas, while 0.2% lived in rural areas.

As of the 2020 census, there were 65,008 households in Grand Prairie, of which 41.5% had children under the age of 18 living in them. Of all households, 48.4% were married-couple households, 17.6% were households with a male householder and no spouse or partner present, and 27.5% were households with a female householder and no spouse or partner present. About 21.3% of all households were made up of individuals and 5.6% had someone living alone who was 65 years of age or older, and the census also counted 46,391 families residing in the city. There were 68,284 housing units, of which 4.8% were vacant. The homeowner vacancy rate was 0.9% and the rental vacancy rate was 7.3%.

Racial composition as of the 2020 census
Race	Number	Percent
White	57,515	29.3%
Black or African American	47,351	24.1%
American Indian and Alaska Native	2,339	1.2%
Asian	14,982	7.6%
Native Hawaiian and Other Pacific Islander	228	0.1%
Some other race	38,114	19.4%
Two or more races	35,571	18.1%
Hispanic or Latino (of any race)	88,749	45.3%

== Government ==
=== Local government ===
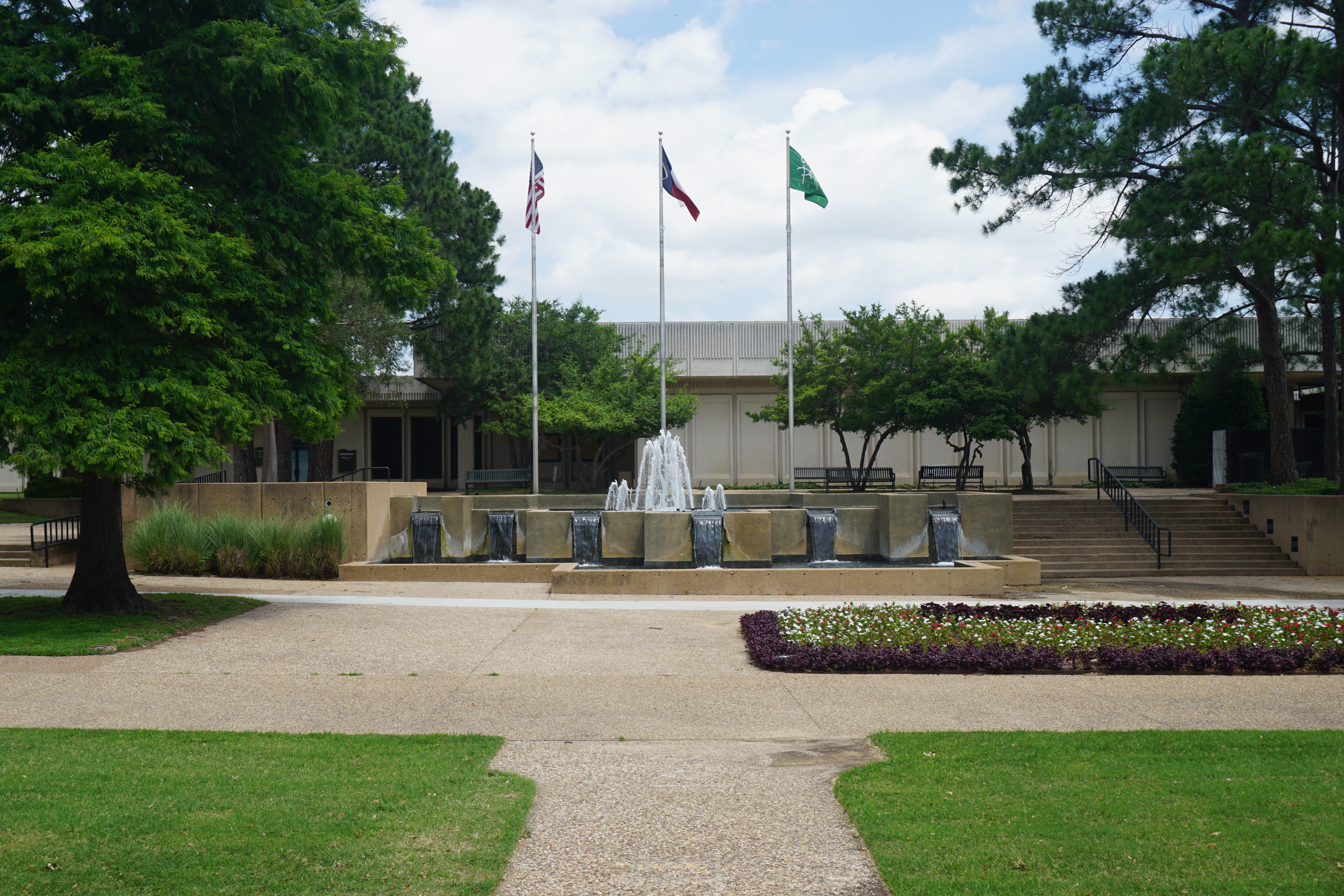
Grand Prairie City Hall

According to the city's 2007–2008 Comprehensive Annual Financial Report, the city's various funds had $275.5 million in revenues, $236.4 million in expenditures, $1,003.2 million in total assets, $424.9 million in total liabilities, and $305.9 million in cash and investments.

The Parkland Health & Hospital System (Dallas County Hospital District) operates the E. Carlyle Smith, Jr. Health Center in Grand Prairie.

Grand Prairie as of 2012 has 320 municipal police officers.

The city of Grand Prairie is a voluntary member of the North Central Texas Council of Governments association, the purpose of which is to coordinate individual and collective local governments and facilitate regional solutions, eliminate unnecessary duplication, and enable joint decisions.

=== Federal representation ===
The Bureau of Prisons (BOP), of the U.S. Department of Justice runs the Grand Prairie Office Complex on the grounds of the Grand Prairie Armed Forces Reserve Complex. Within the complex the BOP operates the Designation and Sentence Computation Center (DSCC), which calculates federal sentences, keeps track of the statutory "good time" accumulated by inmates and lump sum extra "good time" awards, and detainers. The BOP South Central Office is also on the armed forces complex grounds.

== Economy ==
According to the city's 2023 Comprehensive Annual Financial Report, the top employers in the city were:

#	Employer	# of Employees
1	Lockheed Martin Missiles and Fire Control	5,000
2	Grand Prairie Independent School District	3,800
3	Poly-America Inc.	2,000
4	City of Grand Prairie	1,706
5	Flex-N-Gate	1,200
6	Lear Seating	1,105
7	Lone Star Park at Grand Prairie	950
8	Forterra Pipe & Products Inc.	950
9	Republic National Distribution	800
10	K & N Filters	800

Airbus Helicopters, Inc., the U.S. subsidiary of Airbus Helicopters, has its headquarters in Grand Prairie.

In 1978 American Airlines announced that it would move its headquarters from New York City to the Dallas/Fort Worth area. The airline moved its headquarters into two leased office buildings in Grand Prairie. The airline finished moving into its Fort Worth headquarters facility on January 17, 1983, when the airline left its Grand Prairie facility.

== Attractions ==
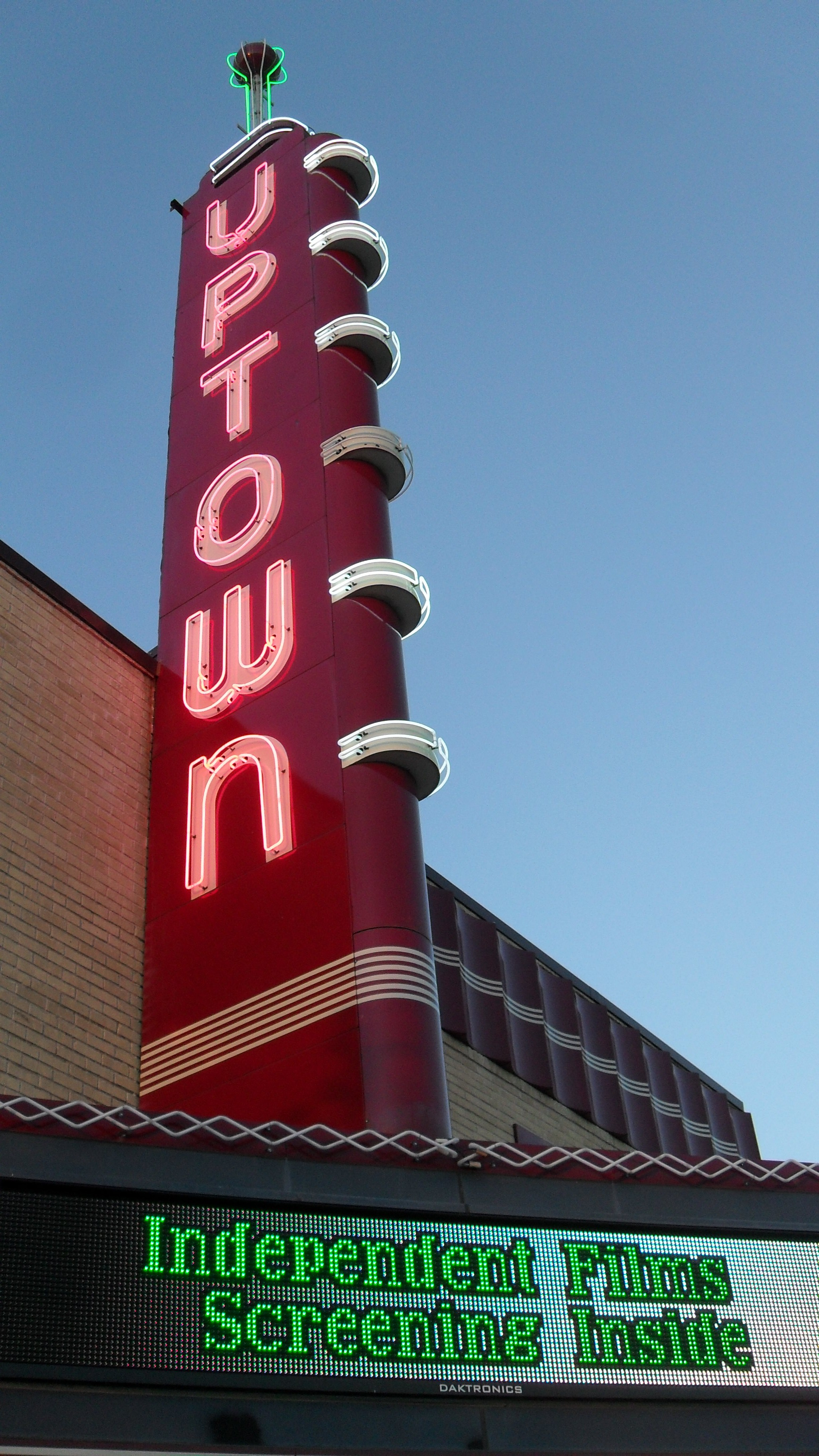
The Uptown Theatre sign illuminated at night

- In 1997 Lone Star Park opened, where each Memorial Day the Thoroughbred Meeting is held, with seven stakes races worth just over $1 million.
- In 2000 GPX Skate Park was opened next to Lone Star Park. It hosted the 2001 and 2002 X Games trials. The park closed in 2005 and was reopened in June 2006 by the Grand Prairie Parks and Recreation committee.
- Texas Trust CU Theatre previously, The Theatre at Grand Prairie and The Verizon Theatre at Grand Prairie, NextStage and Nokia Live, is in Grand Prairie, and it hosts concerts and other events.
- Prairie Lights is a 2-mile-long (3.2 km) seasonal display, featuring more than three million lights on more than 500 lighted displays.
- In 1973, Traders Village was opened off of Mayfield Road, and State Highway 360. It describes itself as the largest flea market in Texas, open on weekends from 7 A.M. until dusk.
- The Grand Prairie AirHogs minor league baseball team and their stadium, The Ballpark in Grand Prairie, were established in Grand Prairie in May 2007 and started play in May 2008. The team ceased operations after the 2020 season.
- The Uptown Theatre in downtown Grand Prairie is a playhouse and venue for concerts.
- The National Recreation and Parks Association (NRPA) bestowed its highest national award, the Gold Medal Award, to the Grand Prairie, Texas Parks and Recreation Department at the 2008 NRPA's Congress and Exposition in Baltimore. Grand Prairie, Texas won the award in the population group of 100,000-250,000, once again being a finalist for the award in 2016.
- Located near I-30 and Beltline Rd, Turner Park became Grand Prairie's Heritage (first ever) Park back in the 1940s and features one of the top disc golf courses in North Texas.
- Epic Waters Indoor Waterpark is one of the largest indoor waterparks in Texas. It opened January 2018 along with a recreation center nearby that opened later that year. The indoor waterpark is the third best in the nation according to USA Today.
- Ripley's Believe It Or Not / Louis Tussaud's Palace of Wax
- The Texas Super Kings major league cricket team and their stadium, Grand Prairie Stadium, were established in Grand Prairie in May 2022. The team started play in July 2023.

== Education ==
=== Primary and secondary schools ===
==== Public schools ====
Most of Grand Prairie's K–12 student population attends schools in the Grand Prairie Independent School District, which serves most areas of Grand Prairie in Dallas County. The Mansfield Independent School District serves areas of Grand Prairie in Tarrant County and operates six elementary schools within the Grand Prairie city limits. Other portions of Grand Prairie reside within the Arlington, Cedar Hill, Irving, Mansfield, and Midlothian school districts. Portions in Dallas County are in the Grand Prairie, Cedar Hill, and Irving school districts. Portions in Tarrant County extend into the Arlington and Mansfield school districts. Portions in Ellis County are in the Midlothian school district.

In Texas, school district boundaries do not follow city and county boundaries because all aspects of the school district government apparatus, including school district boundaries, are separated from the city and county government entirely, with the exception of the Stafford Municipal School District in the Houston area.

===== Grand Prairie Independent School District =====
Lists of Grand Prairie Schools
High Schools	Middle Schools	Elementary Schools	Others
South Grand Prairie High School; Grand Prairie High School; Dubiski Career High School	YMLA at Kennedy; Jackson Middle School; Reagan Middle School; Truman Middle School; Fannin Middle School; Adams Middle School	Austin Elementary School; Bonham Elementary School; Bowie Elementary School; Bush Elementary School; Crockett Elementary School; Daniels Elementary School; Dickinson Elementary School; Eisenhower Elementary School; Florence Hill Elementary School; Garcia Elementary School; Garner Fine Arts Elementary School; Lee Elementary School; Marshall Elementary School; Milam Elementary School; Monroe Elementary School; Moseley Elementary School; Powell Elementary School; Rayburn Elementary School; Seguin Elementary School; Travis World Language Academy (K–8); Whitt Elementary School; Williams Elementary School; Zavala Elementary School	YWLA at Bill Arnold (6th–12th); Grand Prairie Collegiate Institute (6–12th); Crosswinds Accelerated High School; Johnson DAEP

===== Arlington Independent School District =====
The Arlington ISD has the second highest portion of Grand Prairie's K–12 student population. Six Arlington ISD elementary schools are within the city limits of Grand Prairie. Grand Prairie residents in the Arlington ISD are located generally west of the Dallas-Tarrant County boundary and north of the intersection of Camp Wisdom and Lake Ridge in southwest Grand Prairie. One of the Arlington high schools, James Bowie High, has more Grand Prairie residents than Arlington residents that are students at the school.

Grand Prairie student/residents in the Arlington ISD attend Bowie, Sam Houston, or Lamar High School in the Arlington ISD and their feeder elementary schools and junior high schools.

===== Mansfield Independent School District =====
The Mansfield ISD contains the third highest portion of the Grand Prairie's K–12 student population. Grand Prairie residents in the Mansfield ISD are located generally south of the intersection of Camp Wisdom and Lake Ridge, and west of Joe Pool Lake to the Tarrant and Ellis County line in southwest Grand Prairie. Three Mansfield ISD schools, Anna May Daulton Elementary; Louise Cabaniss Elementary; and Cora Spencer Elementary, are currently open within the city limits of Grand Prairie. The Mansfield ISD is the fastest growing ISD in Tarrant County, and the population growth in far southwest Grand Prairie is a major factor in the Mansfield ISD's subsequent growth.

Grand Prairie students/residents in the Mansfield ISD attend Mansfield Timberview High School, Lake Ridge High School or Mansfield High School in the Mansfield ISD or their feeder elementaries and middle schools. Timberview High School is located on State Highway 360 less than 100 yards (91 m) from the Grand Prairie city line.

=== Colleges and universities ===
Dallas County residents are zoned to Dallas College (formerly Dallas County Community College District or DCCCD). Tarrant County residents are zoned to Tarrant County Junior College. Ellis County residents are zoned to Navarro College.

=== Transportation ===
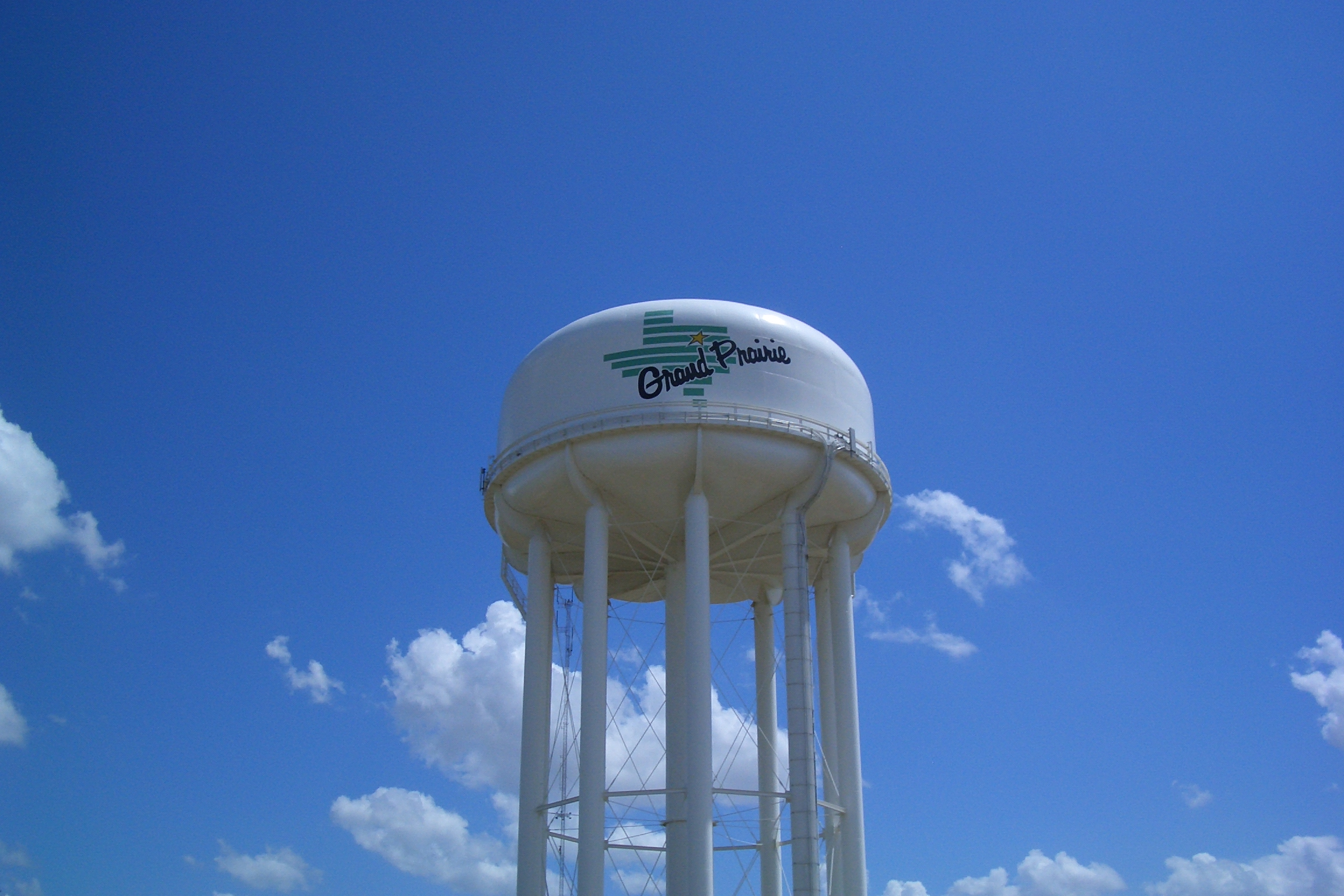
Water tower located next to SH 161

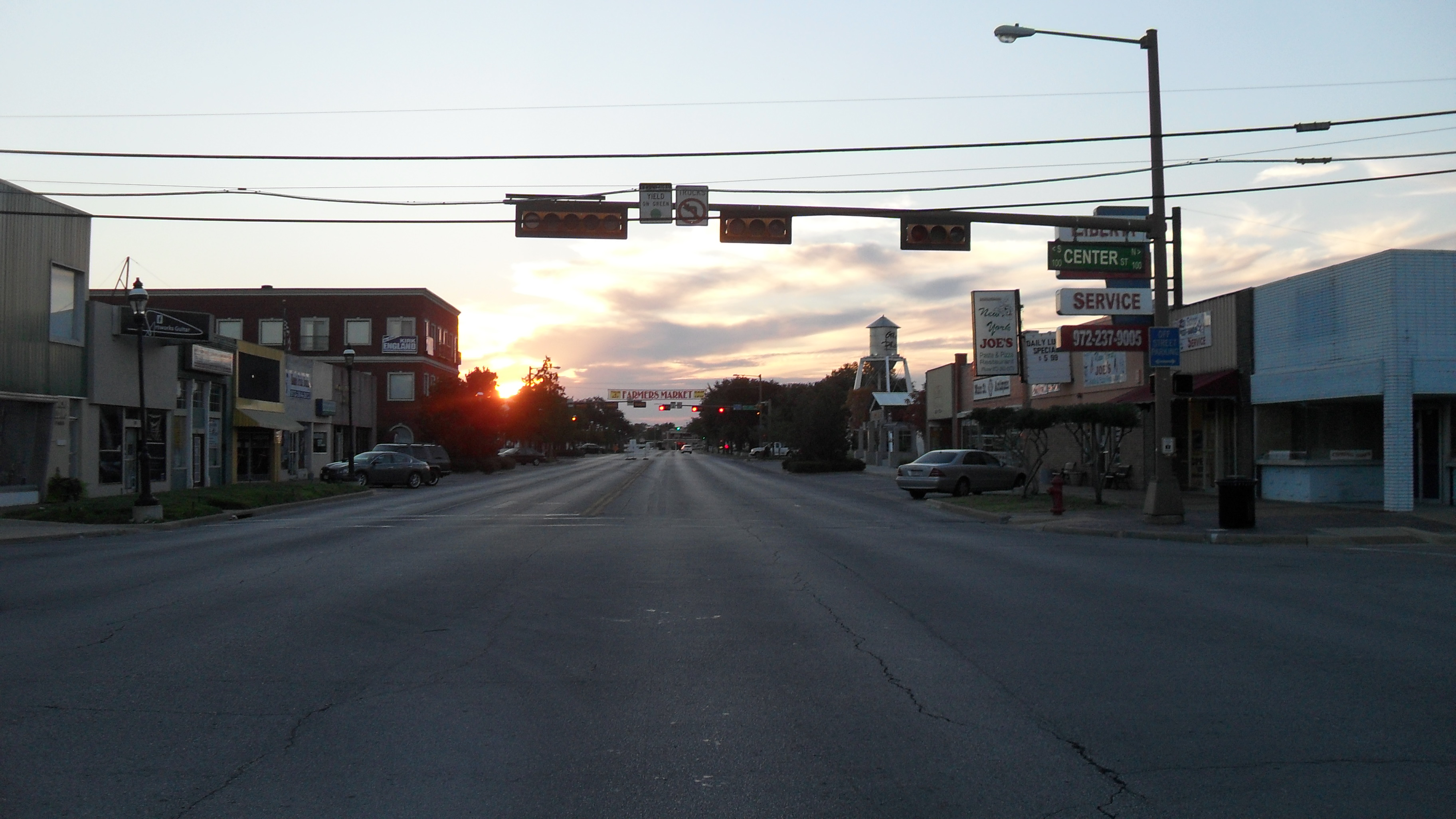
Main Street at dusk, looking west

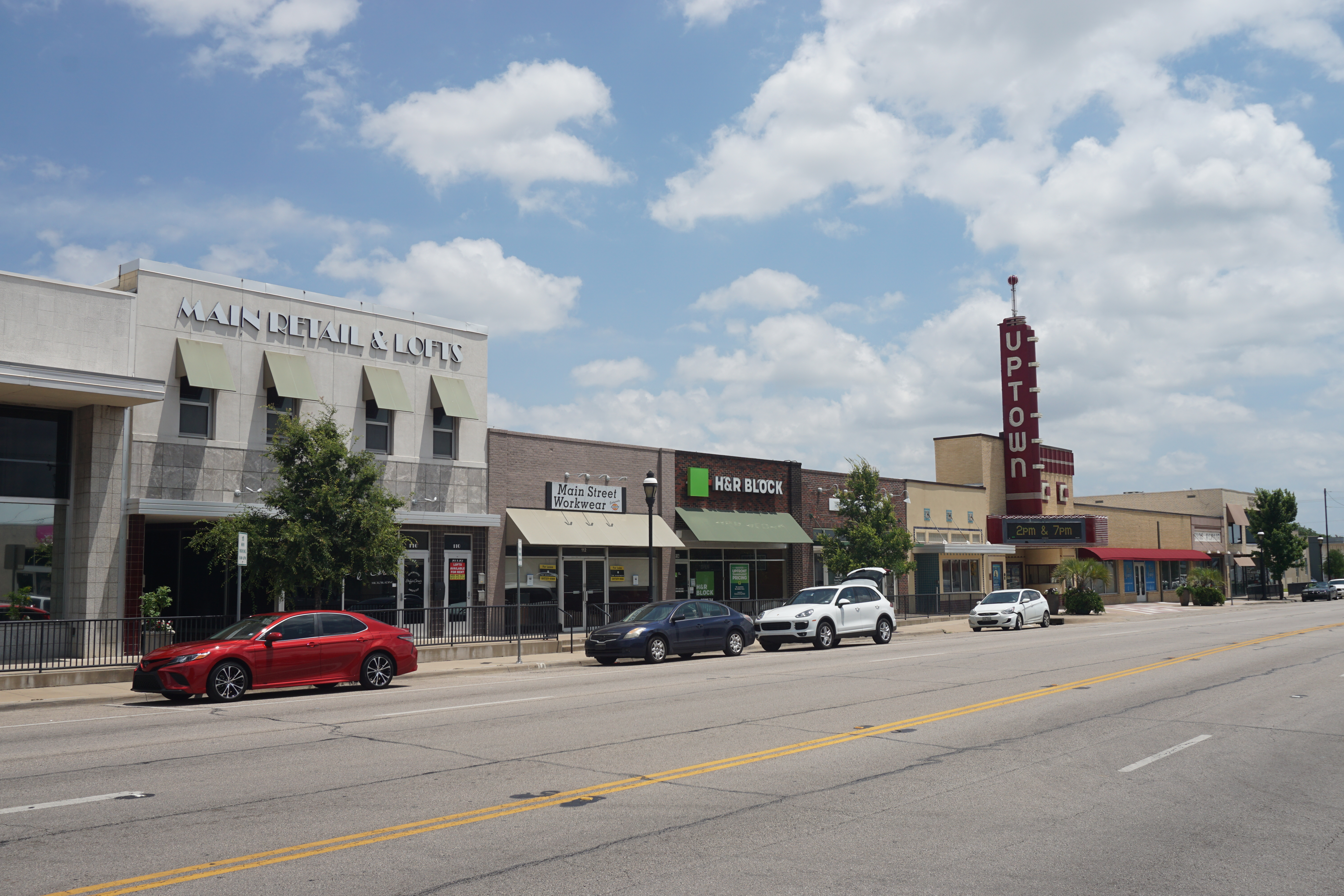
Main Street, looking east

Interstate highways 20 and 30 run east–west through the northern and southern parts of the city. Texas State Highways Spur 303 (named Pioneer Parkway) and 180 (Main Street) also run east–west in the northern and central portions of the city.

SH 360 runs for almost three miles in the northwestern portion of city; most of the highway runs just west of the city limits in Arlington.

SH 161, named the President George Bush Turnpike, runs north–south through western Grand Prairie. The main lanes were opened in late 2012 with frontage roads open since 2010. Portions of the highway located north of SH 180 are depressed while the portion south of SH 180 runs at-grade then becomes elevated. Frontage roads remain at-grade throughout. The frontage road intersection at Main Street will open sometime in 2013.

Belt Line Road is a major north–south thoroughfare in the city. The section of the road south of Main Street is dual-labelled as FM 1382, which travels south, past I-20 and continues south to Cedar Hill. The section of the road north of Main Street keeps its name, continuing north into Irving.

The city declined membership in 1984. In April 2022, Grand Prairie launched "Via Grand Prairie", an "on-demand, shared public transportation" which connects to DART's West Irving station.

In the era of private operation of passenger trains prior to the onset of the Amtrak era in 1971, Texas and Pacific Railway trains such as the Texas Eagle and the Louisiana Eagle made stops in Grand Prairie, on trips between Fort Worth and Dallas. Amtrak's Texas Eagle (Chicago-San Antonio) makes stops at Dallas Union Station 12 miles to the east.

== Notable people ==
- Andre Akpan, soccer player
- Larry D. Alexander, artist and writer
- Rodney Anderson, Republican member of the Texas House of Representatives from Grand Prairie (2011–2013)
- Dimebag Darrell, (1966–2004), musician, co-founder, and guitarist of Pantera and Damageplan
- Wesley Duke, professional football player
- Selena Gomez, singer, songwriter, and actress
- Ruthe Jackson, council member
- Nets Katz, 2012 Guggenheim Fellow and Professor of Mathematics at Caltech
- Jud Larson, auto racer
- Jennifer McFalls, Olympic gold medalist and American softball coach
- Nikki McKibbin, third place contestant on season 1 of American Idol (d. 2020)
- Billy Miller, actor, Daytime Emmy winner (The Young and the Restless)
- Asia O'Hara, drag queen
- Jeff Okudah, National Football League cornerback for the Houston Texans
- Hayley Orrantia, actress and singer, raised in Grand Prairie
- Vergil Ortiz Jr., professional welterweight boxer
- Julie Stepan, racing driver
- Charley Taylor, professional football player
- Eric Vale, voice actor affiliated with Funimation
- Kerry Wood, Major League Baseball pitcher
- Craig Woodson, professional football player
