= Lake Arlington (Texas) =

Lake in Texas, United States

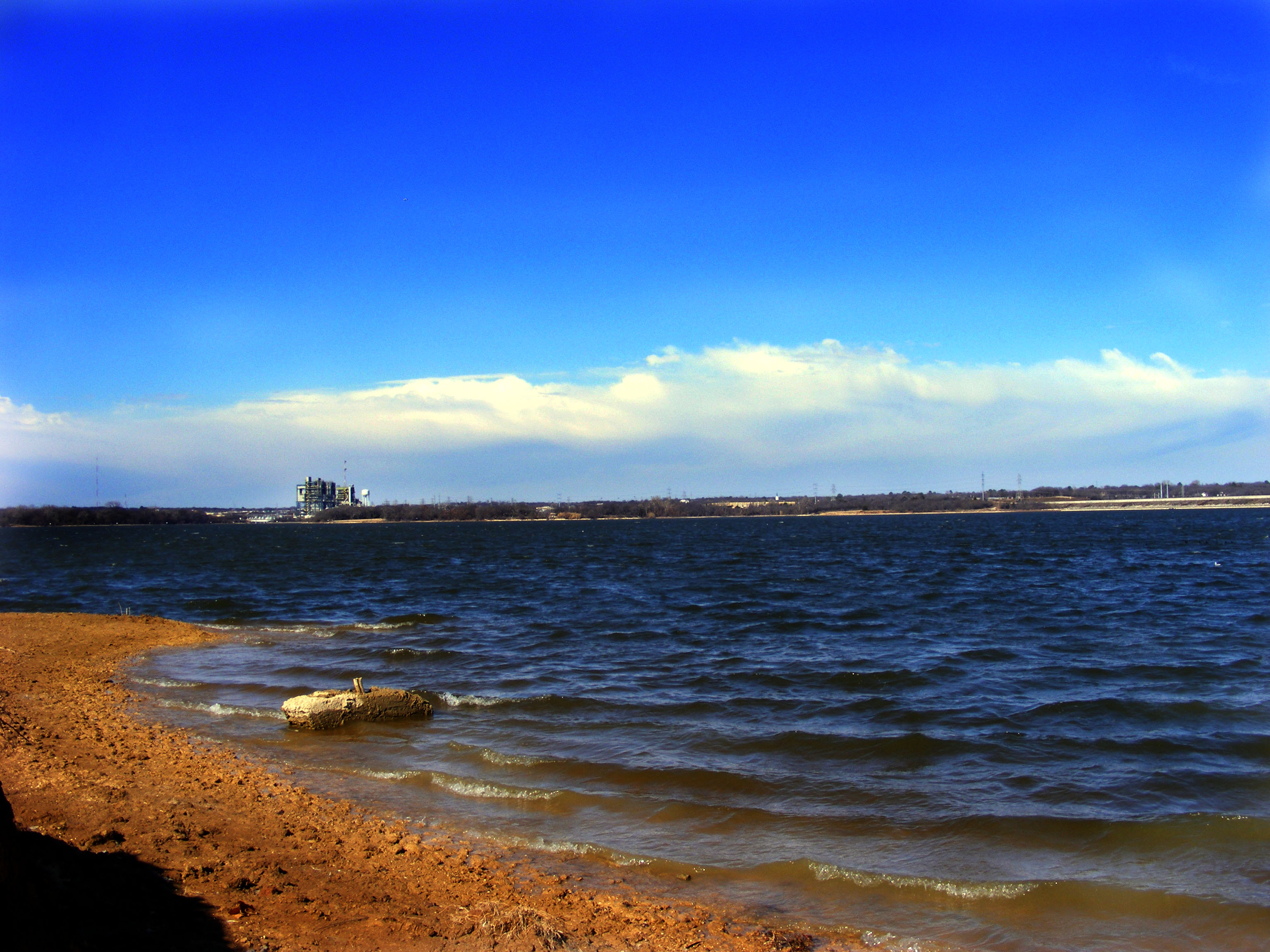
- Lake Arlington
- Interactive map of Lake Arlington
- Coordinates: 32°42′12″N 97°12′51″W
- Type: Lake
- Catchment area: 143 square miles (370 km^{2})
- Built: March 31, 1957; 69 years ago
- Max. depth: 51 feet (16 m)
- Settlements: Arlington, TX (East)

Lake Arlington is a lake located in West Arlington, Texas. The lake is situated east of Interstate 820, and directly west of the city of Dalworthington Gardens. It is located on Village Creek.

== Hydrology ==
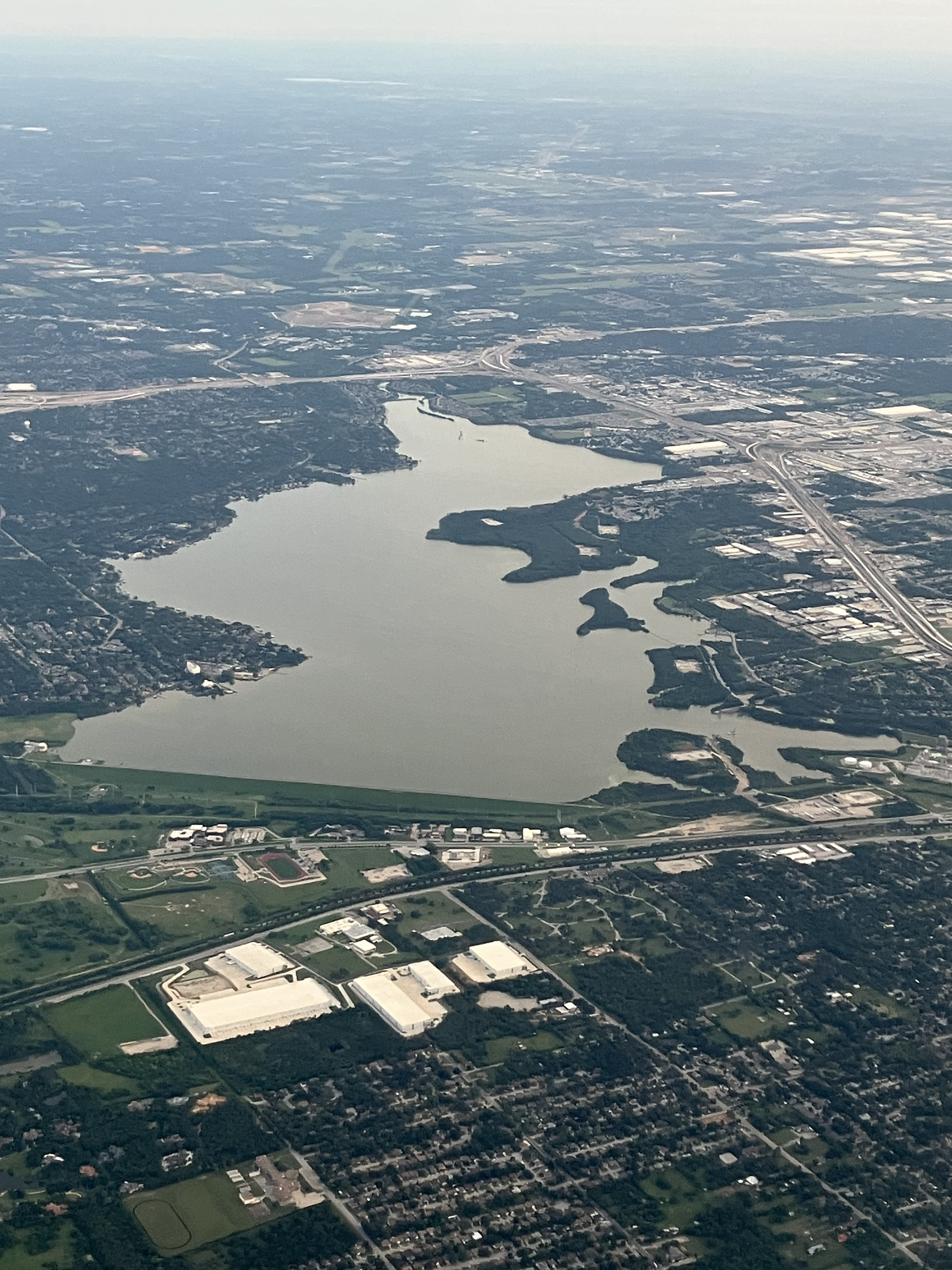
Aerial photo of Lake Arlington

Lake Arlington has a maximum depth of 51 feet (16 m). Its surface is located roughly 550 feet (170 m) above sea level. It has a drainage area of 143 square miles (370 km^{2}).

== History ==
The lake was constructed by the city of Arlington in 1956, and was finished on March 31, 1957. It opened for fishing the following March on March 1, 1958.

In 1983, the lake came under scrutiny from residents of Fort Worth due to a large amount of dumping being performed into the lake.

In winter of 1993–94, the lake was refurbished with new docks. Two new docks and a boat loading ramp were installed at Richard W. Simpson Park, which borders the lake. The docks replaced 30-year old structures. The improvements cost $500,000, $300,000 coming from a 1991 bond issue, and $200,000 coming from a Texas Parks and Wildlife grant.
