= Texas State Highway 360 =

State highway in Texas

State Highway 360
- SH 360, highlighted in red

Route information
- Length: 27.997 mi (45.057 km)
- Existed: 1955–present

Major junctions
- South end: US 287 in Mansfield
- I-20 in Arlington; I-30 in Arlington; SH 183 / Int'l Pkwy in Fort Worth
- North end: SH 121 in Grapevine

Location
- Country: United States
- State: Texas
- Counties: Ellis, Tarrant

Highway system
- Highways in Texas; Interstate; US; State; Former; Toll; Loops; Spurs; FM/RM; Park; Rec
← SH 359	→ SH 361

State Highway 360 (SH 360) is a 28-mile (45 km) north–south freeway in the Dallas–Fort Worth metroplex in the U.S. state of Texas. It runs north from an at-grade intersection with US 287 in Mansfield, near the Ellis-Johnson county line to a partial interchange with SH 121 in Grapevine, near Dallas/Fort Worth International Airport. The highway serves as a local north–south route running through the center of the metroplex, linking together the southern and northern suburbs to the core. Between US 287 and Camp Wisdom Road/Sublett Road, SH 360 follows a pair of frontage roads along a four-lane tollway known as the 360 Tollway, a tollway operated by the NTTA. Between Camp Wisdom Road/Sublett Road and SH 121, SH 360 follows a toll-free freeway maintained by TxDOT.

The highway was opened in several stages throughout its existence. The first portion of the highway was designated on November 30, 1955, between US 80 (now SH 180) and SH 183. Newer portions of the highway were opened between 1960 and 2003. The 360 Tollway was opened in 2018, and is eventually planned to extend southward to a terminus at US 67 in Venus.

== Route description ==
SH 360 begins as a pair of frontage roads at its southern terminus at an at-grade intersection with US 287 in Mansfield, near the Ellis-Johnson county line. North of its intersection with US 287, SH 360 expands into a pair of free two-lane frontage roads along a four-lane toll road, the 360 Tollway, which continues north for 9.7 miles (15.6 km). In southwest Grand Prairie, SH 360 becomes a toll-free freeway at an intersection with Sublett Road/Camp Wisdom Road.

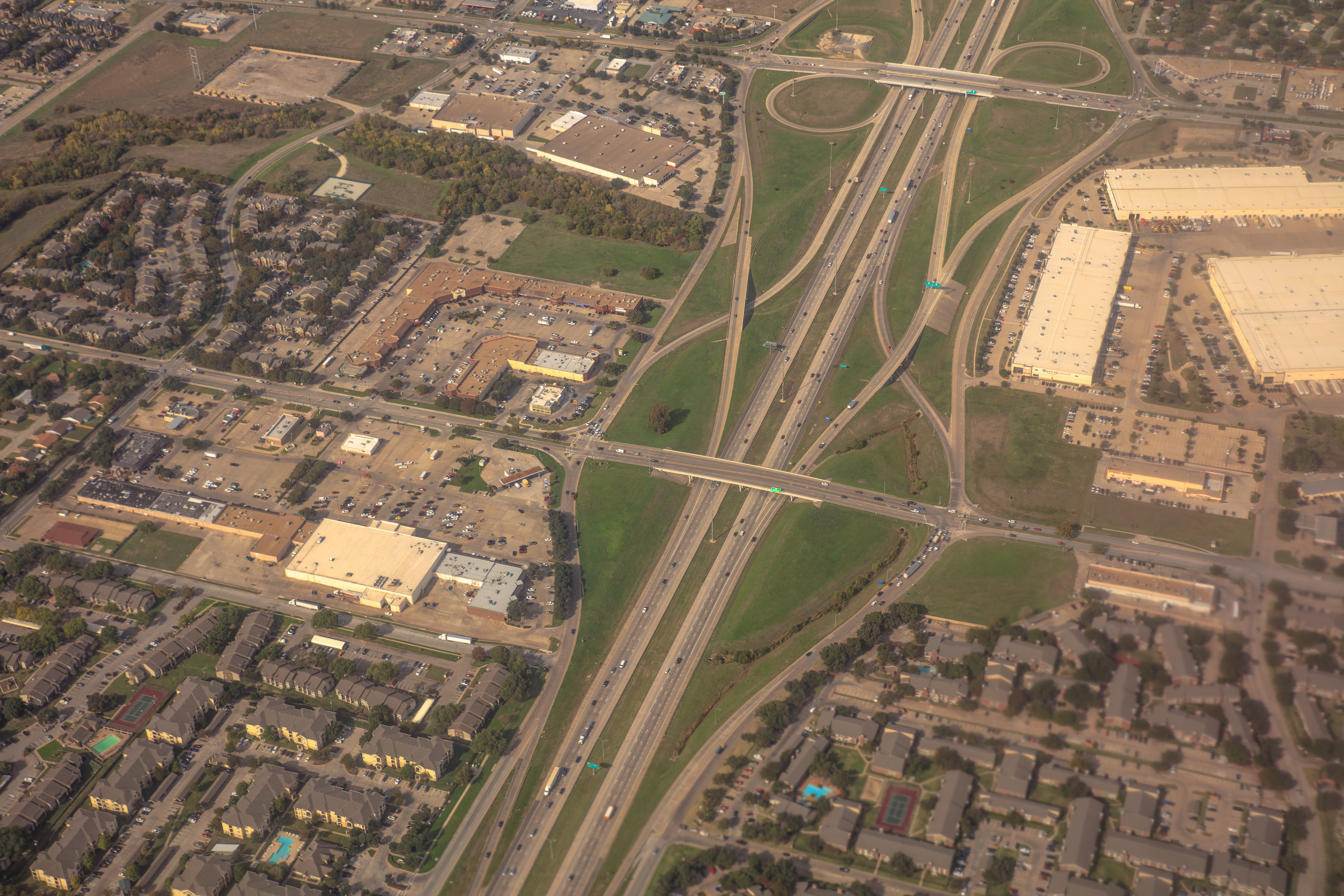
Highway 360 near the intersection of Highway Spur 303

From there, the freeway proceeds north through Arlington near its boundary with Grand Prairie, where it interchanges with I-20 and then meets I-30. However, SH 360 and I-30 are not directly connected. As a legacy of the original toll road design of I-30 (formerly the Dallas-Fort Worth Turnpike), the highways connect only indirectly using long access roads that cross surface streets at lighted intersections.

From I-30, SH 360 then continues north beyond Arlington, interchanging with SH 183 near Euless. From the SH 183 interchange, the freeway continues north-northwest through Euless and into Grapevine, following the western boundary of Dallas/Fort Worth International Airport. SH 360 terminates at its northern terminus at a partial interchange with SH 121 in Grapevine.

== History ==
SH 360 was constructed in different stages over the course of several decades. SH 360 was designated on November 30, 1955, from SH 183 south to US 80 (now SH 180). SH 360 was extended south in various stages, first to Spur 303 on July 25, 1960, I-20 on July 30, 1965, US 287 on June 10, 1966, and US 67 on August 26, 1969. SH 360 was extended north from SH 183 to SH 121 on May 6, 1969. For the most part, each section's frontage roads were built first, handling all of the traffic years before the actual freeway portion was completed (or even begun). Similarly, the interchanges at I-20, I-30, and SH 183 were in place long before the freeway lanes were completed.

The indirect interchange between SH 360 and I-30 is a relic back from when I-30 existed as the Dallas/Fort Worth Turnpike. In order to direct traffic through toll booths, the interchange was designed so that any traffic moving from between the freeways were routed through one common, bi-directional ramp. This was done as a cost-saving measure, as it required fewer toll booths. The toll booths were removed in 1977, but the complex access road system remained.

South of SH 183, SH 360 was previously known as Watson Road. The segment through Arlington is also officially designated as the "Angus G. Wynne Freeway" (after the founder of Six Flags); however, neither the official designation nor the older Watson Road name are locally used, and the road is generally called "360".

=== 360 Tollway ===
360 Tollway
- Location: Mansfield–Grand Prairie
- Length: 9.7 mi (15.6 km)
- Existed: 2018–present

The southernmost segment of SH 360 between US 287 in Mansfield and Camp Wisdom Road/Sublett Road in Grand Prairie was built between 1994 and 2003 as a pair of separated frontage roads, with space reserved between them for main freeway lanes to be added to meet future traffic needs. As traffic along the corridor grew, the SH 360 frontage lanes became increasingly congested. Local and state leaders began studying the construction of SH 360 as a freeway between the existing frontage roads in a project that became known as "360 South". On January 25, 2013, TxDOT and the NTTA approved a deal to construct the extension as a four-lane toll road, the 360 Tollway, in a public–public partnership, with TxDOT performing the design and construction and the NTTA managing the completed freeway as part of its tollway system. Construction on the tollway began in November 2015. A ceremonial groundbreaking for construction of the 360 South toll road was held on October 21, 2015. The first phase of the project, which was planned to build two grade-separated toll lanes in each direction, was estimated to cost $330 million. The tollway opened to drivers on May 11, 2018, and became NTTA's newest toll road. In the future, the toll road may be expanded to four lanes in each direction. The 9.7-mile (15.6 km) toll road has two names: the portion between US 287 and the Mansfield city limit is named the Senator Chris Harris Memorial Highway after the local legislator who aided the extension, and the portion from the Mansfield city limit to Camp Wisdom/Sublett Road is named the Rosa Parks Memorial Highway in memory of the late civil rights figure. The project cost a total of $340 million. Driving the entire length of the tollway costs $1.62 for TollTag users and $2.44 for nonusers, with drivers being billed via mail.

=== I-30 interchange rebuild ===
The former trumpet interchange between SH 360 and I-30 in Arlington became a major bottleneck, compounded by the fact that it intersected with surface streets and was located near major tourist attractions, including Six Flags Over Texas, Globe Life Field, Choctaw Stadium & AT&T Stadium. In November 2014, the Texas Department of Transportation (TxDOT) announced that it would conduct an environmental study on a potential $200 million rebuild of the interchange. The rebuild would offer direct connections between SH 360 and I-30 for the first time. In March 2015, TxDOT approved spending $254 million on the stack interchange project, which would also include improvements to nearby Six Flags Drive. Ground broke on March 2, 2016, and was estimated to be completed in fall 2020 for $233 million. Construction was completed on December 21, 2023, with the interchange being open to traffic in all directions.

== Future ==
The NTTA's future plans for SH 360 include another 5.5 mi (8.9 km) extension of the toll road, which would run from the current SH 360 southern terminus in Mansfield to US 67 in Venus.

== Major intersections ==
All exits are unnumbered.

County	Location	mi	km	Destinations	Notes
Ellis	Mansfield	0.0	0.0	US 287 – Fort Worth, Waxahachie	At-grade intersection with US 287 collector/distributor roads
Ellis	Mansfield	1.7	2.7	Lone Star Road	
Ellis	Mansfield			Lone Star Mainlane Gantry	
Tarrant	Mansfield	2.4	3.9	Heritage Parkway	
Tarrant	Mansfield	2.9	4.7	Broad Street / Holland Road	
Tarrant	Grand Prairie	5.0	8.0	Debbie Lane / Ragland Road	Tolled northbound exit and southbound entrance
Tarrant	Grand Prairie	6.4	10.3	Eden Road / New York Avenue	Tolled northbound exit and southbound entrance
Tarrant	Grand Prairie			New York Mainlane Gantry	
Tarrant	Grand Prairie	7.6	12.2	Webb Lynn Road / Lynn Creek-Mildred Walker Parkway	Tolled southbound exit and northbound entrance
Tarrant	Grand Prairie	8.4	13.5	Camp Wisdom Road / Sublett Road	
Tarrant	Grand Prairie	9.6	15.4	Green Oaks Boulevard Southeast / Kingswood Boulevard	
Tarrant	Arlington	10.6– 10.9	17.1– 17.5	I-20 – Fort Worth, Dallas	Stack interchange; I-20 exit 453
Tarrant	Arlington	11.8	19.0	Mayfield Road	
Tarrant	Arlington	12.7	20.4	Arkansas Lane	
Tarrant	Arlington	13.0	20.9	Spur 303 (Pioneer Parkway)	
Tarrant	Arlington	14.1	22.7	Park Row Drive	
Tarrant	Arlington	14.8	23.8	Abram Street	No direct southbound exit (signed at SH 180)
Tarrant	Arlington	15.2	24.5	SH 180 (Division Street) / Randol Mill Road – UT Arlington	Former US 80
Tarrant	Arlington	16.4	26.4	I-30 – Fort Worth, Dallas	I-30 exit 30; stack interchange
Tarrant	Arlington	16.6	26.7	Avenue H / Lamar Boulevard / Avenue J	Avenue J signed at Avenue K exit southbound
Tarrant	Arlington–Grand Prairie line	17.4	28.0	Avenue K / Brown Boulevard / Fountain Parkway / Burney Road	
Tarrant	Grand Prairie	18.2	29.3	Green Oaks Boulevard / Carrier Parkway / Fountain Parkway / Burney Road	
Tarrant	Grand Prairie	18.8	30.3	Post and Paddock Road	
Tarrant	Grand Prairie	19.6	31.5	Riverside Parkway	
Tarrant	Fort Worth	21.0	33.8	Trinity Boulevard / FAA Road	To CentrePort/DFW Airport Station
Tarrant	Fort Worth	21.8	35.1	Amon Carter Boulevard – D/FW Airport (International Parkway)	Northbound exit and southbound entrance
Tarrant	Fort Worth	22.0	35.4	SH 183 – Fort Worth, Dallas	
Tarrant	Fort Worth	22.8	36.7	American Boulevard	Southbound exit only
Tarrant	Euless	23.0	37.0	Harwood Road / Midway Drive	
Tarrant	Euless	24.0– 24.4	38.6– 39.3	Mid-Cities Boulevard	
Tarrant	Euless–Grapevine line	25.1	40.4	Glade Road	
Tarrant	Grapevine	25.6	41.2	Euless-Grapevine Road	
Tarrant	Grapevine	27.1	43.6	SH 121 south / Stone Myers Parkway	Northbound exit and southbound entrance
Tarrant	Grapevine	27.3	43.9	SH 114 west to FM 1709 – Southlake	Northbound exit and southbound entrance
Tarrant	Grapevine	27.9	44.9	SH 121 north / SH 114 east – D/FW Airport, Dallas	
1.000 mi = 1.609 km; 1.000 km = 0.621 mi: Incomplete access
