= The Equalizer (1985 TV series) season 4 =

The Equalizer
- Season 4
- Season 4 American DVD cover
- Starring: Edward Woodward; Keith Szarabajka
- No. of episodes: 22

Release
- Original network: CBS
- Original release: October 26, 1988 – August 24, 1989

Season chronology
- ← Previous; Season 3

The fourth season of The Equalizer premiered October 26, 1988 and ended August 24, 1989 on CBS. It is the final season of the series.

== Synopsis ==
In this season, The Equalizer goes against a political hard-baller, a psychoanalyst, demon lords, a ghetto drug kingpin, an Oriental slaver, an international cartel, a malign music manager, apartheid Special Branch, South African intelligence operatives, yet more gang rapists, yet more KGB, yet more Mafia, a gun-toting retaliator, a vengeful grieving mother and wife, an international nerve gas peddler, a Bio-WMD, brain-washers, Justice Department moles, Company infiltrators, Company traitors, a Company tribunal, a deaf-hating housebreaker, a fatigued first-responder, a corporate-conniving killer, a belligerent Bulgarian brother, his father's killer, international jewel thieves, local skinheads, a master wargames strategist, and the manipulative "Million" drug dealer.

He saves a made-up-mental maiden, a would-be terrorist avenger, a foreign diplomat, a martyr from martyrdom, a singer's career/life, a mob "family" heir and heiress from "the life," a son's hero and a man's lost hope, two young lovers, and two deaf lovers. He rescues yet another old flame, New York City from a breakout, Control...again..., Sally Jesse Raphael on Live TV, a young girl from a black sorcerer, the homeless from an "angel of death," an "extra-terrestrial" from psychotic delusion, a poet from painful prison death, an amateur sleuth from slaughter, two peaceful men from vigilantism, two sisters from revenge, a young man from radicalization, and another young man from "thug life."

McCall teaches high school thanatology, recites Shakespeare, weapon-tests a toilet and a garbage truck, gets committed for paranoid schizophrenia, "rides the elephants" with Control, and gives a struggling teen John Steinback's The Grapes of Wrath, "A book about a family that survives."

Pete presents bi-polar disturbance, Mickey manages a mental meltdown, Austin cracks Company code, Jimmy becomes Big Brother, Lettie goes back to school, and gangsters get a glimpse of Gehenna.

== Episodes ==
No. overall	No. in season	Title	Directed by	Written by	Original release date	U.S. viewers (millions)	Rating/share (households)
67	1	"The Last Campaign"	Richard Compton	Lee Batchler & Janet Scott Batchler	October 26, 1988	17.0	11.9/18
The reporter Leslie asks if Assemblyman Phillip Wingate is running against incumbent senator Virgil Thomas Blake. While publicly supportive, he secretly wants Blake's resignation and endorsement. Wingate's assistant Cindy Claussen discovers blackmail material on Blake. Having heard of McCall from Susan Foxworth, she asks for help. Jay Trescott drugs Cindy. Her neighbor Darlene tells McCall, "Medics took her." Sterno finds her committed to Longview Psychiatric Institute. At a free clinic, McCall asks his friend Dr. Wolff for help. Since Wolff can't get her out, he commits McCall; paranoid schizophrenic. "I am quite wonderful at feeling hostility, Dr. Quentin." "Hrmm...OK...spies, adventurism, overthrow governments...I see," replies Dr. Quentin. Pete gets in too; "bi-polar disturbance." Robert prevents Jay from drugging Cindy, and they hear her story. Pete keeps eye on Jay and protects Cindy. After fencing, Wingate blackmails Blake. McCall asks Blake to help, but he is afraid, so he rattles Wingate to "resign, Resign, R E S I G N."
68	2	"Sea of Fire"	Alan Metzger	Story by : Peter McCabe; Teleplay by : Peter McCabe & Coleman Luck	November 2, 1988	16.1	11.7/18
Cristo and the Demon Lords watch as "Goat" gets jumped in to run a "franchise." Principal Elena Rodriguez complains to Arthur Williams about school resources. The Demons rape Alicia. Elena calls The Equalizer. They stab Eduardo Sanchez, who reported it. McCall and Elena talk to Alicia. Mrs. Sanchez frantically arrives at the ER. Frustrated, Sgt. Alice Shepard doesn't have the manpower. McCall requests off-duty volunteers from the Gang Task Force, who seize forty-three guns from school. McCall starts teaching Physical Science 800. The subject? Death! A thanatology field trip to the morgue. The Demons watch an autopsy by the Medical Examiner. Cruz is sickened; Goat chastises them. "Hitter" Phillip Borchek explains his profession, until he was shot in the face with a .38, and had an out-of-body experience – an ocean, but not water; a Sea of Fire. McCall wants Alicia to return to school, and testify. Elena asks Williams for time before dismantling the school. Williams argues with McCall. Cristo and Goat try to trap McCall. Mickey protests McCall going in unarmed.
69	3	"Riding the Elephant"	Donald Petrie	M.K. Lorens	November 9, 1988	14.7	10.6/16
A kickboxing match goes poorly for Narong Bansari as drug dealing slaver Jimmy Thanarat watches at his sports arena. At the Rose of Bankok massage club, Narong gifts his mother's necklace to Manika, but she feels uneasy wearing it, doing what she does. Jimmy breaks them up; he will not let either of them out of their contracts. Narong says he'll do anything. At Pete O'Phelan's for his birthday, McCall reminisces with Control about "riding the elephants" (Note: The Top 30 Thai Proverbs and Sayings. # 28 – Riding an elephant to catch a grasshopper. Pronunciation: khìi-cháang-jàp-dták-gà-dtaaen. Explanation: This Thai proverb refers to a situation where you invest a lot but only get a small return. It warns us to be careful with our investments so that we don't end up losing out in the end. Example: What are you thinking? Buying a new car to deliver packages for a few times. You're investing a lot for a small return.) in Angola. Thai national Sirit Bansari finds China white heroin in a crate his son Narong was holding for Jimmy, so Sirit chastises Narong. Sirit throws the heroin in the trash. In the shadows, Flack sees it. Narong warns Sirit the "ghost soldiers" will kill him if they don't find it. Sirit disowns Narong, so Narong asks Manika to flee with him. She calls The Equalizer. He intervenes to save Sirit, but learns Control buys intelligence from Jimmy, giving Jimmy a free hand. Sirit tries to buy Manika's freedom for his son, but Jimmy holds Sirit hostage. McCall, Mickey and Narong have to be careful, but quick to get him back.
70	4	"Eighteen with a Bullet"	Richard Compton	Bruce A. Taylor	November 16, 1988	16.3	11.4/17
Eighteen year-old singer Beverly Heat is on the rise, while Gina Rox is on the decline. Beverly's mother Evelyn Weaver finds her drunk and warns her. Evelyn asks McCall to help Beverly escape the clutches of her manipulative manager Greg Rivers. Mickey provides McCall background; Rivers specializes in teens, swindles their earnings, hooks them on drugs, and discards them. They visit Graham, who was the hottest DJ in town. Graham says Rivers ruined his career and moved on to Gina Rox. Jealous of Beverly, Gina threatens Greg with cops and reporters, regarding the pay-offs, the drug deals; she's not heard from again. Beverly takes fan calls Live on the air with a WZAD DJ. Mickey turns the tables on Rivers by calling in. Outside, he separates Rivers from Beverly and drives off so McCall can enlighten her. At Gina's apartment, he shows her the future. Then he starts in on Rivers, with voice-modulation help from Graham.
71	5	"Day of the Covenant"	James A. Contner	Robert Eisele	December 7, 1988	11.0	7.7/12
Twelve years removed from the violent Soweto uprising, Scott and his girlfriend Zandili play a happy tune. She leaves with "cousin" Ben. A masked man tries to kill her, and they flee. Robert asks why Special Branch is after her. He draws out the gunman, an Afrikaner named Voorhees. McCall asks why he would harm a defenseless girl. "Defenseless? Kafir bitch," he replies before ranting about Blood River and his "Day of the Covenant." He claims she is a terrorist who killed his wife by bombing his SAP station. McCall takes him to Anton Jooste, an NIS operative at the South African Consulate. Ulysses tells Mickey she led an uMkhonto cell, but the ANC would not operate in America. Having learned her past, Robert confronts Zandili. She leaves, but now Jooste is after her. Ben helps Zandili escape Jooste and his impimpi. McCall deduces Zandili's next target is the Deputy Secretary for the Department of Cooperation and Development. Note : The opening scene portraying the South African government crackdown on the 1976 anti-apartheid Soweto uprising is an excerpt taken directly from the 1987 film, Cry Freedom (starring Denzel Washington and Kevin Kline), filmed in Zimbabwe. It ends with another excerpt of a speech by Desmond Tutu.
72	6	"Splinters"	Paul Krasny	Coleman Luck	December 14, 1988	15.1	10.8/17
John Allenwaite is informed the operation is underway. Mickey leads a clean-up mission. His team is ambushed, killed, and he is captured. McCall answers a coded call from Control who suspects the mission was compromised by Parmelee. For the enemy operation, McCall confronts Gropman; with his retirement fund and a toilet. The project is called "Intangible Plastics" (i.e., psychological warfare). "We call the procedure, Spinter," Allenwaite explains to his audience, as Mickey, unconscious, has a vision of McCall implanted. For Mickey's location, McCall confronts Parmelee; with a garbage truck. Mickey next envisions a murdered woman, Serena. Allenwaite's assistant increases the dosage. Allenwaite waits for McCall; Parmelee is of no further use. McCall learns the Company has been infiltrated by a KGB unit, using agency finances to research brainwashing. McCall must overcome Mickey's programming, before Mickey kills him.
73	7	"Making of a Martyr"	Bradford May	Wayne Powers & Donna Powers	January 11, 1989	16.0	11.3/18
Brandon Thorton wakes from a dream of being shot and paralyzed. Sylvia Thorton gives a gun control presentation. In the audience is pro-gun Congressman James Harcourt, and gun-violence victim John Kelly. She receives threatening calls. Brandon calls McCall. Sylvia argues for police, not vigilantes. McCall asks Shepard for a wiretap. A policeman rousts Mickey from his surveillance van outside the Thorton's home, allowing Kelly entry. Shots are fired, but he escapes. The forensic detective finds fibers but no prints. Shepard and McCall argue motive, but agree on a computer search. Sylvia goes live on WFQB-FM's Talkback with Chris Perley about her upcoming television debate with Harcourt. She talks about the man threatening her. He calls in and fires a gun. She calls him a coward. McCall suspects Sylvia is orchestrating it, and repudiates making a martyr of herself. McCall and Mickey review Shepard's research, establish motive, and confirm their suspect. At the TV-8 Facing Facts studio, Kelly gains entry and plants a gun after fooling the stage manager. During the interview with Sally Jessy Raphael, he fires the gun.
74	8	"The Sins of Our Fathers"	Paul Krasny	Tom Towler	January 18, 1989	16.6	11.1/17
It is a normal day at the playground with Carlo Jr., his nanny Estrella, and mafia guards Blanda and Disimone. Carlo is taken. Mobster Carlo Alberto "The Angel" Santelli is livid, shouting at Tommy Dio. Lettie and McCall discuss Shakespeare before the call from Carlo's mother, Natalie Santelli. Mickey describes what happened. McCall smells a military operation. They contact Carter Brock, who got a letter, $5,000, and "one very weird tape of instructions." Santelli is contacted; "I don't want money, I want YOU Angel. I'm going to kill everything you love." Jonah hacks the D.A. and The Times for Santelli's rap sheet: assault, racketeering, extortion, drug smuggling in Turkey, and murder. "No Disposition!" McCall intends to change that. Natalie meets McCall, Carlo has her tailed, Mickey intercepts them. Santelli demands to know who's helping her. Mickey has the tape analyzed at InterTex Sound Lab; "modern technology triumphs again...the original dulcet tones of the kidnapper." Armed with identity and motive, McCall tries to find Sarah Booth, open Natalie's eyes, get her into WITSEC, save the son, jail the father, and read Sonnet 73 to Lettie. Just a normal day.
75	9	"The Visitation"	Bradford May	Robert Eisele	February 1, 1989	15.6	11.0/17
International arms dealer Daniel Ruger is selling nerve gas, so (coughing) small-time gun smuggler Asa Lazar will not deal. Ruger can not trust him, so Garrick and Tillerman grab him. Lazar flees into a residence, but the new mother denies entry. Garrick shoots him, but catches a fatal strain of African orthopoxvirus. At Pete O'Phelan's, McCall dines with an old flame, Dr. Lauren Demeter, an epidemiologist at the U.N.'s International Health Organization. The Medical Examiner performs Lazar's autopsy, and quickly enlists Dr. Phil Molinari from the Dept. of Health, Bureau of Contagious Diseases. Molinari sends blood to the CDC, and calls his colleague, Lauren. Lieutenant Brannigan's mass round-up of suspects tips Carpenter who says, "The Mayor would want the people to know." McCall convinces him to grant 48 hours to isolate Lazar's killers. Mickey finds Bagler's cousin, Dr. Harriman; a "top quack in NYC" who "lost his license for performing unnecessary surgeries." He finds Tillerman, but Lauren takes Ruger's number, trying to deliver the serum to anyone who needs it. Now McCall and Mickey must rescue Lauren.
76	10	"Past Imperfect"	Russ Mayberry	Gail Morgan Hickman	February 15, 1989	17.2	11.9/19
Corman welcomes Ray Quintero. Ray's chauffeur hands him the phone. "Hello, Ray. Goodbye, Ray." The chauffeur tries to garrote him, Corman tries to shoot him, but Ray escapes. Big Brother Jimmy visits Thomas and his mother Cecilia Romero. Men try to kidnap Tomas. Ray shoots one, the others escape. Jimmy scoffs at Lt. Brannigan's theory. Mickey identifies him as David Lance. McCall sees his tattoo; "What we need is an expert on strange and esoteric information." For meaning, Mickey leverages Luther Munson. McCall tells Jimmy and Cecilia about the Darien Cartel, and Ray Quintero. "Name mean anything to you Mrs. Romero?" She tells her story, while Tomas eavesdrops. Mickey spots Company surveillance men. McCall berates the first man and orders the second to contact Control. Control and Justice Department agent Elliott Jarvis want Ray's testimony. McCall hears Ray's story. Jimmy dissuades Tomas from running away. Corman comes after Tomas, and Garfield is shot. McCall suspects a Company mole. Ray gives his testimony and is shot. At the funeral the priest reads "a mystery" (1 Corinthians 15:51-52). Tomas gets his own special chauffeur.
77	11	"Trial by Ordeal"	Marc Laub	Coleman Luck	March 1, 1989	13.9	9.8/16
Prosecutor Charlie McGuinness summons McCall ("reclassified Category Red" (Note: Brahms had told McCall in "The Equalizer (pilot)" that the Company had classified McCall as "Code Red...Top Security Violation" because he resigned. At the end of the episode, Control lowers McCall's code to Yellow, "officially dangerous, but tolerable.")) to an Internal Operations Sword Star "Company tribunal...bloody kangaroo court!" Warned against resigning (in "The Equalizer"), they reassert McCall's twenty-nine year-old oath. Asked about an envelope exchange (in "A Community of Civilized Men" (Note: Surveillance photos in "Trial by Ordeal" are screen shots taken from "A Community of Civilized Men," when McCall hands Control the "Genesis" list, approximately between time index 32:00-34:00.)), McCall scoffs, "mail order for new bowties...a secret sauce," but Control committed treason – Morrison Directives violation #28, establishing his own network, which McCall utilized (in "Counterfire" (Note: Control uses personnel loyal to his own Exden network in "Counterfire" to extract McCall from the courthouse during arraignment, after Thomas Marley Jr. frames McCall for Tom Clark's murder.)), providing quid pro quo (in "First Light" (Note: McCall's testimony in "First Light" clears Control from further questioning by Lorraine Watson at a Senate Hearing.)). If Control is convicted, McCall also goes on trial. Having worked for the Operations Director (in "Beyond Control" (Note: Control runs his own Exden Inc. network in "Beyond Control" to bypass Company oversight, which results in KGB mole John Ferman infiltrating Exden to copy top-secret Company files, including Exden Doc. #1344-H. Ferman is killed by KGB hit-man Paul Coble, from whom McCall protects Control.)), Mickey testifies about Exden Doc. #1344-H (25 years of assassinations, government destabilization, currency manipulation, Everything!). Evidence is entered – Control's "Genesis" list of Sand Star Confederation signatories, declaring, "We the undersigned pledge our lives, and our resources to the worldwide defense of human rights, accepting as our mission, the overthrow of any force that shackles the freedom of human conscience, by unjust imprisonment, false trial, torture, and execution." The Judge asks, "Do you disavow this document?" Control, "No, I do not." The Tribunal finds Control guilty, but a death sentence requires unanimous peer agreement. McCall calls for a statement; Control makes his plea, to free the "Prisoners of Conscience."
78	12	"Silent Fury"	Russ Mayberry	Donna Powers & Wayne Powers	March 8, 1989	14.4	10.0/16
Two masked men break in. She paints. They take the silver service. She's oblivious. The fruit bowl; still, she paints. It's not enough; they take her necklace too. Valerie's heart gives out in a wordless scream. Hall, "That was good! Where to?" Crocker drives to the next target. Ron proposes. Jackie, "Yes. Oh Yes." In the bedroom, they interrupt two masked men. Ron charges Hall, unmasking him. Crocker grabs Jackie at knife-point. They flee with Jackie's wedding ring. Lieutenant Brannigan struggles questioning the deaf couple with Ron's silent fury. Ron's friend and Deaf Center volunteer David Pfieffer translates their statement. Jackie calls McCall, but Ron does not trust him. Mickey gets the police report and tells McCall about Pfieffer. Hall, afraid of being fingered, draws Ron out via SuperPrint. McCall arrives in time, but Crocker takes Hall out. With only circumstantial evidence, Brannigan is stymied. McCall puts the Pfieffer "rat back in his hole," then consults Company engineer Fineberg about "the power of sound." Fineberg, "The Company is very excited about the possibilities...emitting frequencies via satellite...very damaging and cost effective." Ron's fury boils over. He goes after Pfieffer, getting himself and Jackie captured. McCall and Mickey sound off.
79	13	"Lullaby of Darkness"	David Jackson	Coleman Luck	March 30, 1989	16.9	11.9/19
Rebecca Morrison simply asks, "more spaghetti?" But nothing pleases her psychopathic abusive husband Joseph. Their daughter Mindy closes her eyes, knowing what's next. As Joseph beats Rebecca, Dream Father appears, urging Mindy to "The Fun Room" out the window, up the fire escape. Dream Mother also appears to comfort Mindy. Rebecca's neighbor Mrs. Drake phones The Equalizer, explaining she already called police, but Joseph is a powerful stockbroker, and his doctor diagnosed Rebecca as having injurious seizures. Sgt. Shepard confirms Mrs. Drake's story. McCall surveils Joseph. To assuage Mindy's fear, Joseph buys her a doll of The Sorcerer who in time tells her, "I can kill things...forever. All you have to do is wish." McCall, hearing Rebecca yelling, barges in and witnesses Rebecca's seizure. Joseph medicates her, then calls police on McCall. After the Judge's diatribe and restraining order, McCall tells Mickey seizures are also caused by brain damage from beatings. Joseph files a $5,000,000 retaliatory suit against Mrs. Drake. After McCall witnesses Mindy sleepwalking to the Fun Room, he consults Dr. Myrna Grayson who takes action, with help from Andy the Monkey and McCall's video camera. McCall, Mickey, Mrs. Drake, Sgt. Shepard, and Detective Kelly set a dangerous trap for Joseph.
80	14	"17 Zebra"	Alan Metzger	Jacqueline Zambrano	April 6, 1989	17.4	12.1/19
Policemen chase a punk who shoots a juvenile bystander. The dispatcher calls, "17 Zebra...man down." Decorated senior paramedic Edward F. Gideon responds with his rookie partner, Donna Marie Estrelita Concepcion Friedman. Still under fire, she finds no pulse until Gideon revives him. Skid Row homeless arrive at McKenzie Mission. Fossil Williams turns Lucky away for drunkenness. "17 Zebra" is called again. Friedman handles Lucky, passed out, while Gideon chides the superintendent for wasting their time on some "worthless drunk." Friedman drives the ambulance; Gideon injects Lucky, who dies from a heart attack. Suspecting murder, Fossil calls The Equalizer. Lucky was 35 and healthily. Jacob Stock investigates four deaths, finding the common denominator. Another homeless man triggers Gideon into a traumatic flashback. Doctor Molinari suggests Gideon might've used pancuron. McCall arranges a drive-along, becoming convinced Gideon suffers from combat fatigue. He asks Friedman for help. Another attack and Gideon nearly crashes, a vial slipping from his pocket. McCall devises a plan to incriminate Gideon, and Fossil volunteers. Gideon flashes back to a mother and her little girl who was stabbed to death; he freezes, then explains. McCall arrives, and Gideon tells Friedman, "You did the right thing."
81	15	"Starfire"	Bradford May	Robert Eisele	April 13, 1989	16.7	11.7/19
Seti fiddles with electronics in his basement. Eleven year-old Amber Sweeny brings a sandwich and Hopi pottery. Seti senses The Confederation landing on Earth to kill him for his "silicone intelligence" containing "the memory of my race." Amber introduces Seti, and Robert quips, "Search for Extra-Terrestrial Intelligence?" Seti explains he was sent from Epsilon Eridani as a "pact-maker" by The Grand Mu. "The Vegans have a Confederation...End-Time fanatical," and he dubs Robert, "Quotan, interstellar defender." Dr. Cameron Wolff says, Seti "experienced trauma...psychotic precipitating factor," translation, "schizophrenic delusion...adaptive behavior." Wolff advises, "Establish trust...learn his past." McCall sends Seti's device for Company analysis. "End-Timers" shoot at Mickey and Seti. Claire Sweeny insists on meeting Amber's new "father figure." Mickey finds Seti's "kaleidoscope" patentee; Wayne Virgil, aerospace systems engineer at AeroDimensions. Mickey stops Company sniper Snider, who's freelancing to silence Virgil for senior AeroDimensions engineer Clinton Brandauer who loses millions if the merger with Transnational Aviation fails. Brandauer calls Crandell for security, but Mickey intervenes. McCall confronts the executives. Seti says, "My name is Wayne Virgil," and reveals the Vega-1 rocket explosion at Vandenburg that killed twelve, before rambling, "We are all made from Starfire." Seti leaves with Wolff to receive therapy.
82	16	"Time Present, Time Past"	Gordon Hessler	Tom Towler	April 20, 1989	15.1	10.8/18
At the store of musicologist Harold Ross, Scott McCall listens to a rare Giacomo Puccini performance by opera singer Licia Albanese. Yorgi Kostov adds the sound of suppressed gunfire, shooting "Emil" in the leg. Kostov and Arnoff haul Harold/Emil out. Scott, intervening, is taken hostage to the Bulgarian Embassy. Control briefs an outraged but scared Robert. Harold reveals he is really Emil Kostov, former head of Covert Operations for Bulgarian Intelligence. Robert explains to his ex-wife Kay, Scott's mother, that as a Kim Philby-esque double agent, Emil defected ten years prior. Kay is angry at Robert for introducing Scott to Ross, placing his beliefs, honor and duty above family. Mostly, Kay still blames Robert for his absence prior to the death of their daughter from cardiomyopathy. McCall wants to rescue them, but to appease Russia the State Department will return Emil to Bulgaria. Scott devises his own escape plan, then insists on freeing Emil despite parental objections. Kostmayer, Brock, and Thompson drill Scott relentlessly in preparation. They storm the embassy, but Emil has decided to clear the family name by returning to Bulgaria. Yorgi shoots Brock, forcing Scott to make a life-or-death choice before Yorgi shoots Emil.
83	17	"Prisoners of Conscience"	Marc Laub	Robert Eisele	April 27, 1989	14.7	10.4/17
Chilean poet Antonio Cruz recites, and tells his teacher Waldo Jarrell he wrote it while imprisoned "for my conscience." Leaving school, Jarrell witnesses Tony's abduction. Jeremy welcomes Waldo to Pete O'Phelan's and Robert recognizes the "signature" of Randall Payne, who shot Robert's father in the back at Port Said during the 1952 Egyptian revolution. Thought dead for fifteen years, Payne was working for the Company. McCall demands Payne's dossier, and Control says, "I have worked all my life to free prisoners of conscience." Meanwhile, Payne tortures Antonio for the names of the guerillas he counseled as a psychological advisor to La Vicaría de la Solidaridad, the human rights arm of the Catholic Church in Chile. Mickey learns that the CNI want to discredit the Vicariate to affect upcoming elections. Robert recalls serving as a British Army officer at age 19 under his father, Captain William McCall and he has an imaginary conversation with him. Waldo reveals that as a Hollywood screenwriter, he too was blacklisted and imprisoned for his ideas, just like Antonio. McCall and Mickey locate Payne and his CNI operative to free Antonio. Robert must decide how best to avenge his father's murder.
84	18	"The Caper"	Alan Metzger	Tom Towler	May 4, 1989	15.0	10.8/17
Crime/mystery novel enthusiast Emmy Rutherford cleans to classical, while Kenny Pack pursues a man in Central Park. Emmy witnesses the murder. Dubiously, Sgt. Alice Shepard recalls the last time, it was Rutherford's neighbor carrying his dead wife inside a soggy carpet. Emmy's determined to help solve it, telling Frank Zelinski the killer is after her. Frank finds McCall's advertisement. Company agent Trudy Collins is enlisted to protect Emmy, who finds Pack's mug shot. Detective Kelly says Pack's girlfriend is striptease dancer Taffy Gould, who doesn't provide McCall any useful information. Seeing Danny sneaking away, McCall confronts him. Pack is killed by his boss Devon Jarrow to eliminate links. To leave, Emmy traps Trudy in the bathroom, enlisting Frank to solve the crime, but she's followed. McCall shoots the man before he can kill her. Shepard identifies him as Jack Washer, part of Jarrow's crew. Trudy finds "Clinton Street" and Emmy uses her novel knowledge to discover a clue; "Van Warren's," indicating the caper is a jewelry heist. Emmy distracts Frank to escape police protection, and is abducted by Jarrow who stole the Habsburg diamond; 132 carats, worth $17,000,000. The mysterious "Lou" is revealed, holding Emmy hostage at gunpoint.
85	19	"Heart of Justice"	Bradford May	Gail Morgan Hickman	May 11, 1989	14.6	11.2/18
A clerical error forces Justice Lindsey Smith to accept the defense motion to suppress the steel pipe that put Cynthia Gianelli in a coma. Both Prosecutor Solaris and Cynthia's husband Michael Gianelli object in vain. The rape charges against Tony Santiago and Max Gorman are dismissed. Michael vows to kill Santiago and Gorman. A man with a scared hand leaves the courtroom. When Michael and Cynthia's sister Laura argue, she realizes he has a pistol and contacts McCall fearing what Michael will do. Jacob Stock gives McCall the rapists' parole reports. Michael finds Tony to kill him, but the scarred-hand-man kills Tony first. An old woman thinks Michael shot him, so Lt. Brannigan arrests Michael. Stock can't find anyone else with motive against Santiago. McCall believes a vigilante pattern exists. They trail Gorman, but the vigilante escapes. Company Criminal Data Analysis expert Oscar parts with his mistress Michelle, aka Teresa Curtis who is a double-agent working for Cuba. McCall leverages Oscar who finds a suspect; Victor Koslo. Stock briefs McCall and they go after Koslo. Michael escapes jail and hunts Gorman with a gun. Together, McCall and Koslo try and talk Gianelli down before Michael becomes a killer just like Victor.
86	20	"Race Traitors"	Robert E. Warren	Donna Powers, Wayne Powers, & Gail Morgan Hickman	June 29, 1989	11.6	8.3/16
Casey Taylor hears police and pulls over; He is terrorized by Ridge Park skinheads. Casey's wife Martha calls The Equalizer. McCall urges Mickey to help, despite it being his high school neighborhood. The Aryan leader at Dale Stevens' white supremacy presentation asks why he should support a refrigerator repairman. Tavern operator Ellen Kaminsky complains about failing businesses, and "now the blacks are moving in." Angry his brother was murdered by a Negro, Ellen's son Nick helped attack Casey, and gets tattooed "American Skinhead" at a rally. Stevens rants, "The day of the rope will come," displaying a noose for "race traitors." Detective Warren recognizes Stevens as lower-echelon KKK. McCall asks former Company agent Barbara Ashton for a cover story to infiltrate Dale's skinheads posing as Aryan Identity leader Walter Jessick. Mickey surveils Stevens. Skinhead Alex in blackface fires on white pizzeria customers with an Armsel Striker shotgun. The Newscaster reports it killed a man. Dale fans the flames at Ellen's tavern, and implies Nick agrees. Jacob Stock arrives to protect the Taylors. Mickey and Ellen plan to show Nick how wrong Dale is. To incriminate Dale, "Walter Jessick" tests Stevens to shoot a "traitor" skinhead, Chuck. Detective Warren arrests Stevens. Note : The episode opens with historic footage of Adolf Hitler, the German American Bund, and neo-Nazi skinhead activity from the news.. It is overlaid by a speech narrated by the fictional character Dale Stevens.
87	21	"Endgame"	Alan Metzger	Coleman Luck	August 10, 1989	11.2	8.3/15
Wargamer Ernest Rasher cherishes his son's Purple Heart. Hit-man Stuart Dodd intrudes. Rasher fires poison from his model cannon, but wants a different death. With her paintball gun, Susan Wilhite plays capture the flag against Yellow Team members inside the derelict Gettysburg Hotel; one hit, one miss. Her third shot kills yuppie ArmTech co-worker Michael with a .44 magnum. The detective can not believe someone tampered with her gun. Sergeant Alice Shepard has no record of its theft. Army Captain Linda Wilhite, formerly a Pentagon Criminal Investigator, arrives as Susan's lawyer, but Susan wants The Equalizer, showing McCall model Confederate soldiers she received. Mickey surveils as Susan's boss Charlie Arnold suspends her. Dodd offers her a drink, per instructions. Linda also receives models; Union soldiers. McCall explains the expensive strategy game pieces. Linda provides her list of Army wargamers. Dodd is meeting Susan for a date – with death – tonight. Mickey finds NYC wargamers, including Rasher. Linda finds Dodd OD'd, dead in her bed. Susan assumes Linda framed her. Shepard arrests Linda for conspiracy. McCall explains the Civil War soldiers; brother against brother, sister against sister. Through Strategy Games International, Robert "Cavendish" (McCall) challenges Rasher, revealing Rasher's endgame against Linda and her sister Susan.
88	22	"Suicide Squad"	Marc Laub	Jacqueline Zambrano	August 24, 1989	11.2	8.2/15
"Doc" Pete checks the knee. Coach Bell cuts Willie Halsey for failing performance and GPA, endangering his football scholarship. Willie lies to his father Joe. Hammer offers "help." Willie's sister Mary Lou calls The Equalizer because Hammer deals drugs for Luther "Million" Paxton. At Million's job offer Willie balks, "the Foreign Legion" is "safer." Carter Brock says Paxton's ex-jock "Suicide Squad" deals his "coke, steroids and Quaaludes." McCall confronts Willie. Paxton buys Willie's parents a recruitment gift. Willie offers to help Joe's business, but Joe wants him earning from sports. Willie goes to Paxton's gym. McCall convinces Coach to extend Willie's scholarship. Willie argues, Mary Lou wrote his papers; football is his only shot. McCall informs Joe and his wife Kitty who argue with Willie. Paxton sends Willie to deal with Dominicans. McCall's ultimatum to Paxton, "You close your entire operation down...I might let you live." Paxton Shanghaies Hammer for double-dealing, and gives Willie a revolver. McCall tells Joe, Willie is now armed and dealing. Disguised, Brock gets Willie "Scared Straight!." McCall adds, Hammer was murdered, "They found pieces of his body in the river. Is that they way you want to live? Or die?" They set a trap for Paxton.

== Cast and characters ==
=== Main ===
- Edward Woodward as Robert McCall
- Keith Szarabajka as Mickey Kostmayer

=== Recurring ===
- Maureen Anderman as Pete O'Phelan
- Leonardo Cimino as Doctor Phil Molinari
- Eddie Jones as Lt. Brannigan
- Robert Joy as Jacob Stock
- Robert Lansing as Control
- Mark Margolis as Jimmy
- Irving Metzman as Sterno
- Joe Morton as Carter Brock
- Harsh Nayyar as a Medical Examiner
- Austin Pendleton as Jonah
- Wendell Pierce as Dr. Cameron Wolff
- Chad Redding as Sgt. Alice Shepard
- A. L. Sheppard as Detective Kelly
- Ken Solarino as Jeremy
- Yvonne Wilder as Lettie
- William Zabka as Scott McCall

=== Notable guest stars ===
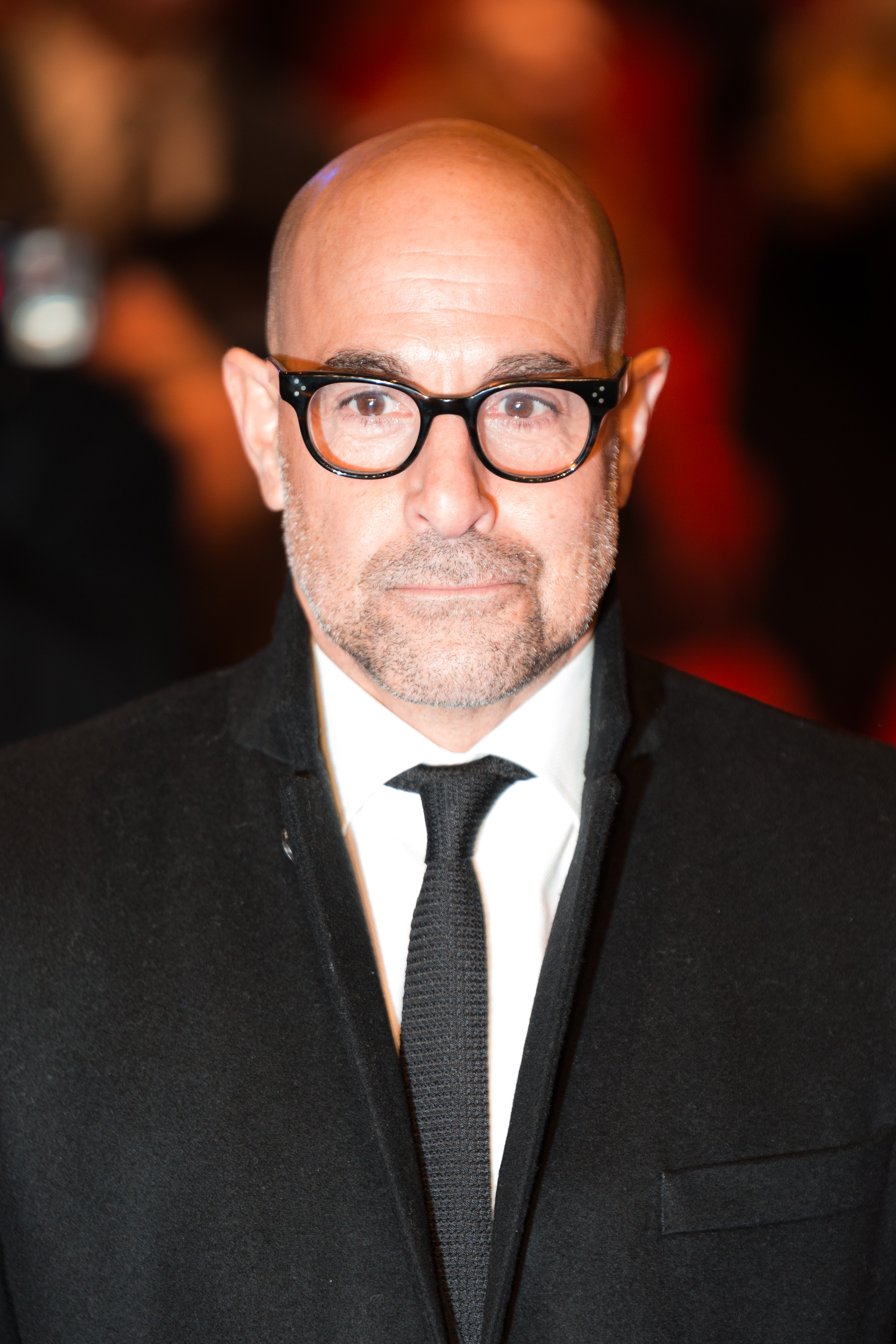
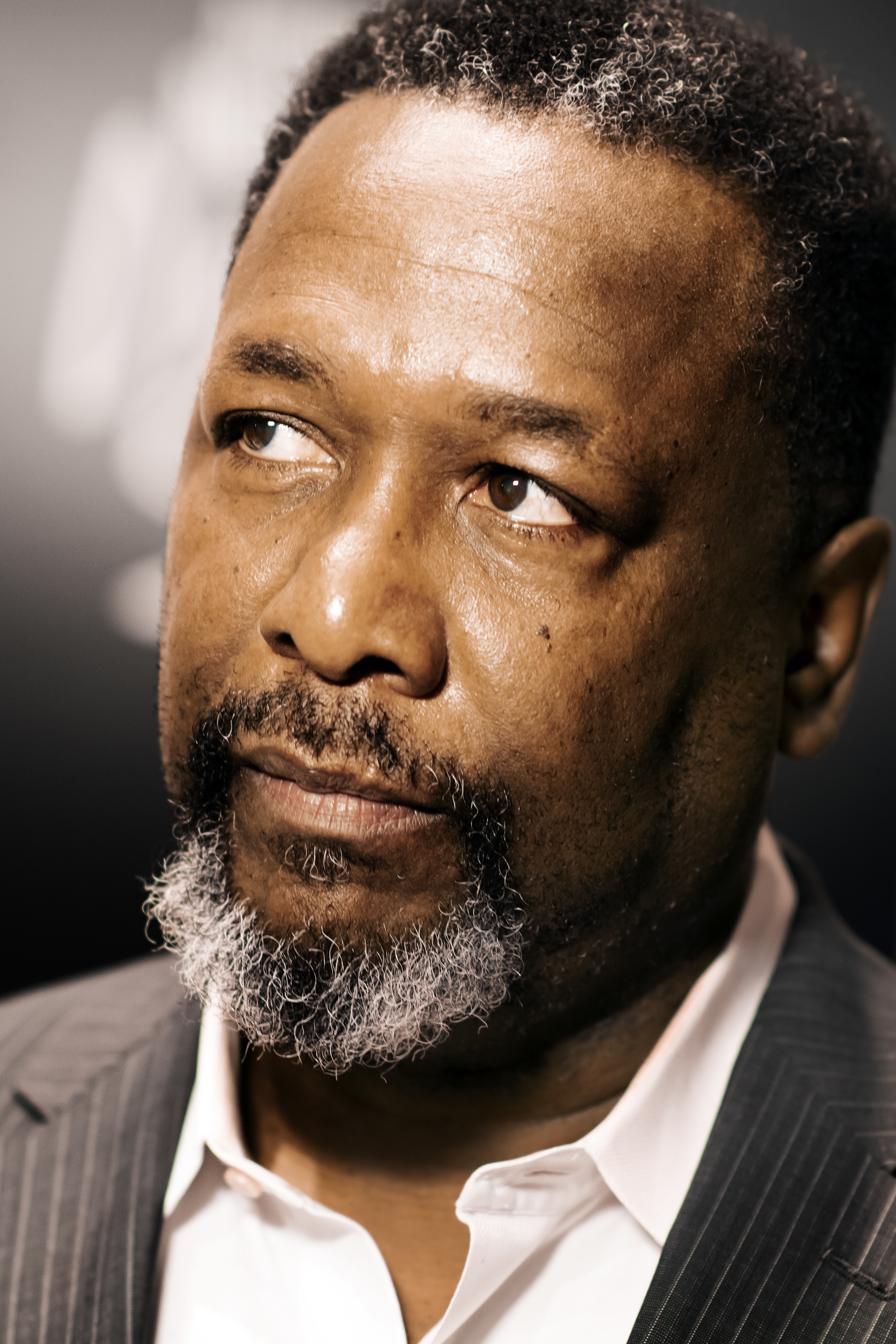
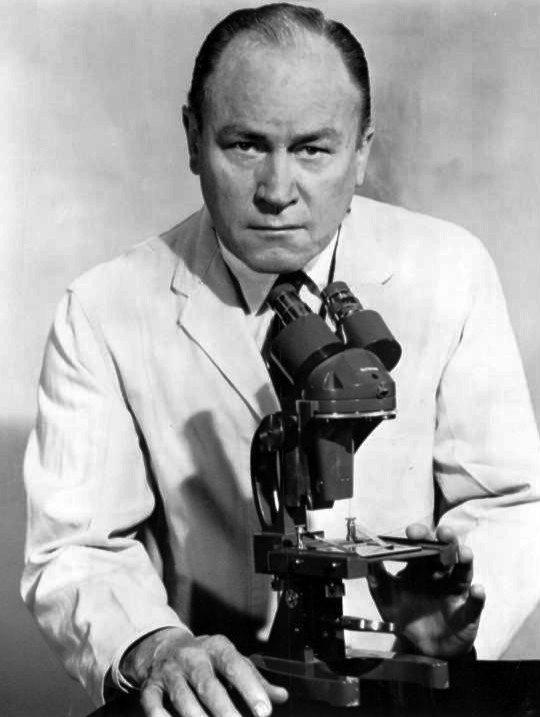
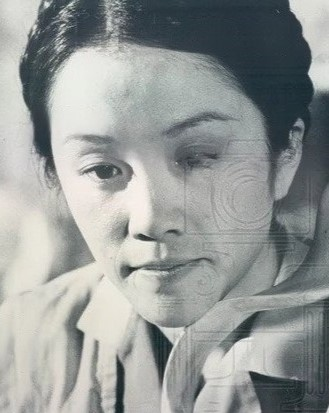
Marshall – Tucci
Foh Shen – Pierce
- E. G. Marshall as Virgil Thomas Blake, an incumbent senator.
- Stanley Tucci as Phillip Wingate, an assemblyman who has "dirt" to force Blake to give up his seat and publicly endorse Wingate for the election.
- Laila Robins as Cindy Claussen, Wingate's aide, who stumbles upon material he plans to use to blackmail Blake. Disrupting his plan, she calls The Equalizer. Robins also plays CIA director Suri Nance in the 2021 re-imagined series season one episode, "The Milk Run."
- Yvonne Bryceland as Darlene, Cindy's next door neighbor who witnessed medics carting Cindy away after an apparent drug overdose.
- Larry Keith as Dr. Quentin who runs the psychiatric ward where Cindy has been committed against her will at Wingate's orders.
- Maureen Anderman as Pete O'Phelan, her last guest star appearance, who gets herself committed with Dr. Wolff's help to protect Cindy and to surveil Jay.
- Jay Patterson as Jay Trescott, who works for Wingate doing his dirty work.
- Wendell Pierce as Dr. Cameron Wolff, a psychologist who McCall finds running a neighborhood free clinic in "The Last Campaign." Pierce's second appearance is in "Starfire," diagnosing Virgil's condition and agreeing to help him recover.
- Freda Foh Shen as Leslie, a reporter who questions Wingate's plans on running for the Senate.
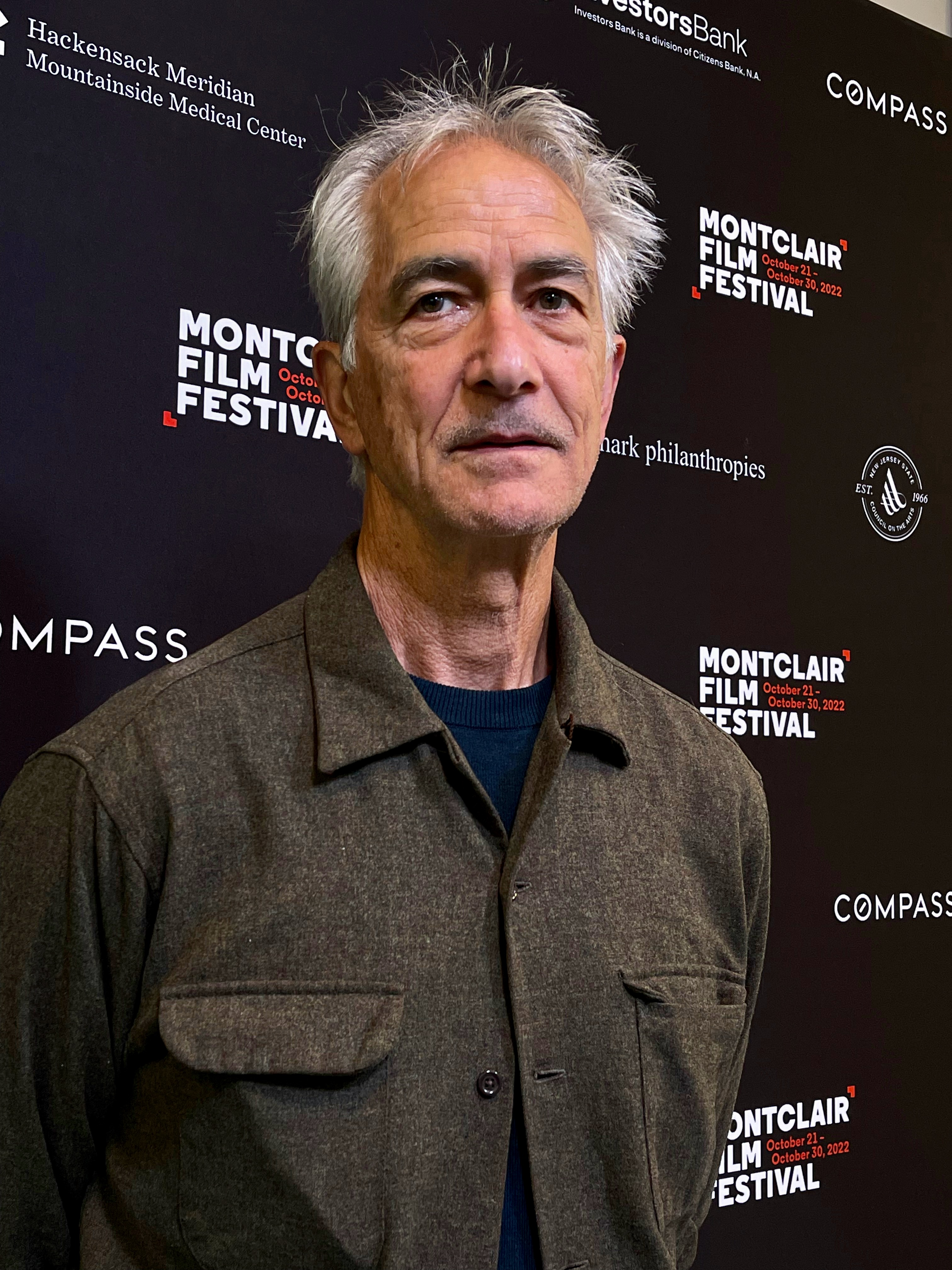
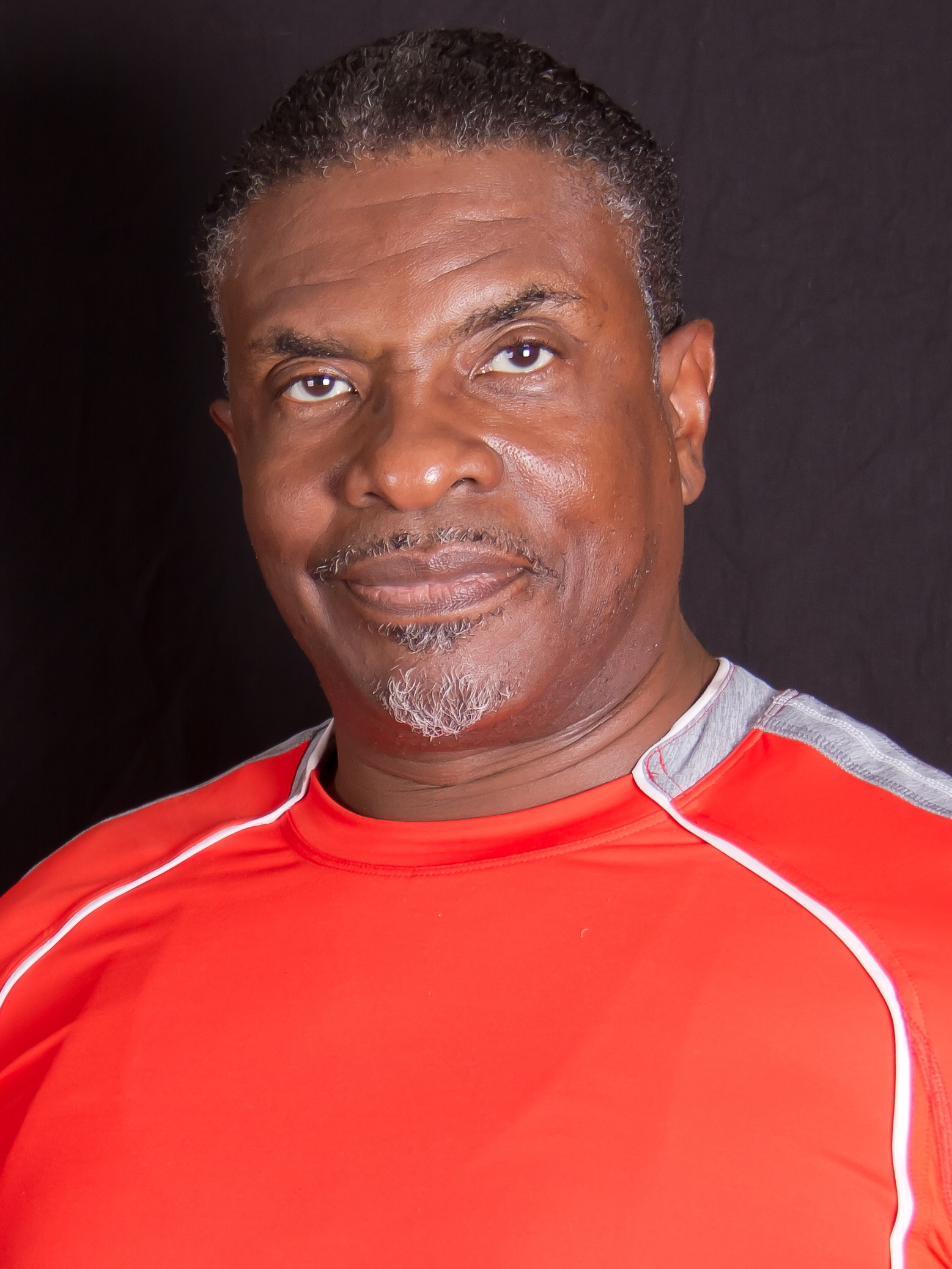
K. David & Strathairn
- Seret Scott as Elena Rodriguez, the school principal who tries to keep the school safe and open, as school board members threaten closure.
- Keith David as Cristo, a neighborhood gangster boss trying to expand his narcotics operation into the school market, jumping-in Goat (co-star Tito Núñez) to run his own franchise including Cruz (Sixto Ramos) and the rest of their Demon Lords gang, who intimidate students and gang rape Alicia (Lucy Vargas).
- Reginald VelJohnson as Arthur Williams, a school board member, who tells Principal Rodriguez he has no choice but to close the school according to the board's decision.
- Harsh Nayyar as the Medical Examiner, who demonstrates an autopsy to the Demon Lords in "Sea of Fire," illustrating the consequences of gang violence. Nayyar also appears later in "The Visitation."
- David Strathairn as Phillip Borchek, a former professional contract killer, who nearly died from a 38-caliber shot to the face, and glimpsed what awaited him in the afterlife if he did not change his life-path.
- Socorro Santiago as Mrs. Sanchez, the mother of Eduardo (Jose Ynoa), who was stabbed by the Demon Lords in retaliation for reporting Alicia's rape to Principal Rodriguez. Santiago also plays the Mother of the Little Girl (played by Diane Lozada) who was stabbed by the unremorseful man Gideon was forced to treat in "17 Zebra."
- Karina Arroyave as Girl #1, one of many school students who appeared in "Sea of Fire."
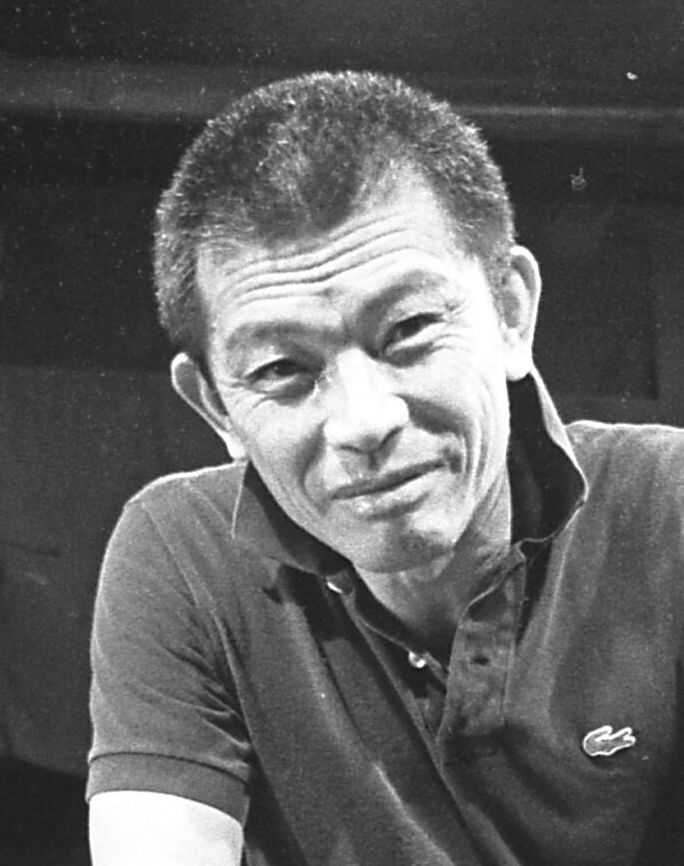
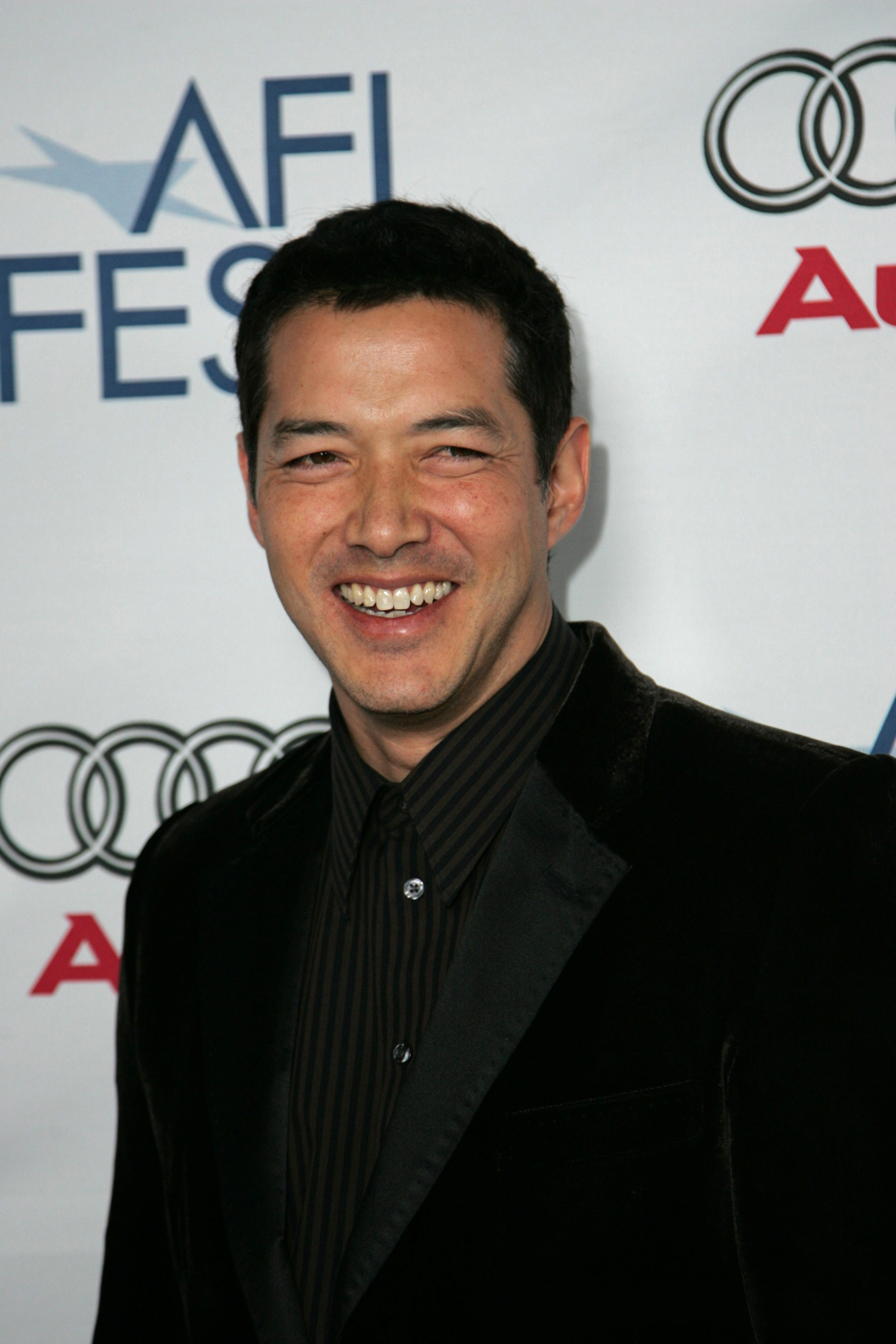
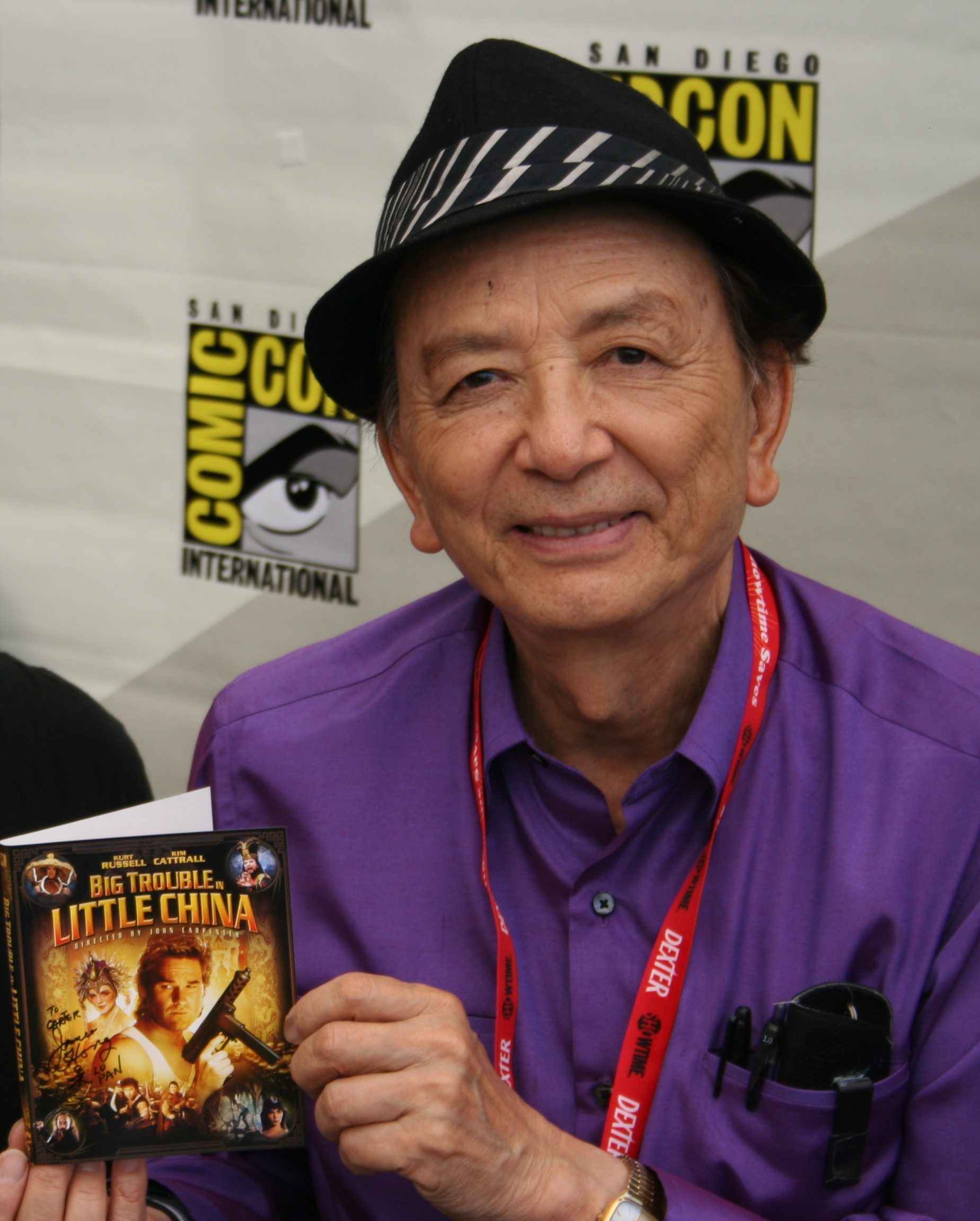
Hong, Wong & Mako
- James Hong as Sirit Bansari, a very traditional Thai national who observes old-world customs, disowning Narong after discovering his involvement with Jimmy Thanarat.
- Russell Wong as Narong Bansari, Sirit's son, who is "Riding the Elephant" to catch his love Manika regardless of the consequences. Entrapped in a "stable" of kick-boxers at Jimmy Thanarat's sports arena in return for entry into the United States, and willing do anything to escape his "contract" and buy Manika's freedom, he conducts risky business – smuggling Jimmy's China white heroin through Sirit's store, urging Sirit to forget the past and embrace the current realities of life in America.
- Elizabeth Sung as Manika, who is under "contract," ensconced at Jimmy Thanarat's Rose of Bankok massage parlor in return for entry into the United States. Hoping for eventual citizenship, she calls The Equalizer.
- Mako as Jimmy Thanarat, a ruthless gangster who controls "contracted" slaves worth more to him alive than dead. Jimmy scoffs at Sirit's attempt to buy Manika's freedom with a family heirloom gold Buddha, holding Sirit hostage to force Narong's compliance.
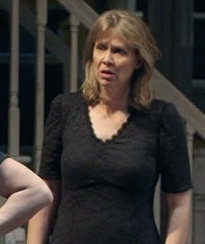
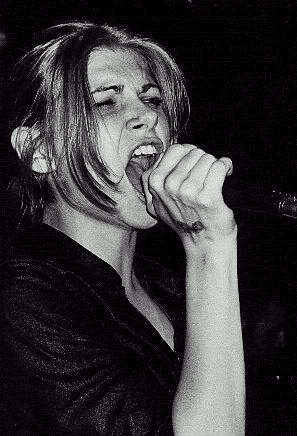
Vitamin C & Morton
- Bruce Payne as Greg Rivers, a manager for singers, who specializes in teens, ensuring success to swindle their income, hooking them on drugs for their reliance, and discarding them (even fatally) if they rebel.
- Vitamin C guest stars under her real name, Colleen Ann Fitzpatrick as Beverly Heat, a naive young singing star rising like she's "Eighteen with a Bullet." She respects and idolizes the older, well-established Gina Rox, but doesn't realize how badly Greg used and abused her.
- Amy Morton as Gina Rox, whose career declines after years of earning money and being Rivers' lover. Heroin hastens her deterioration and demise at Rivers' hands. Morton also appears as Linda Wilhite, an intended victim of Rasher's "Endgame."
- Caroline Lagerfelt as Evelyn, who finds her daughter Beverly drunk and calls The Equalizer to help her escape Rivers' manipulations, and the lifestyle that destroyed Gina Rox.
- Terrence Mann as Graham, a former disc jockey whose career was ruined by Rivers.
- Ken Ober as a DJ, who plays Beverly Heat's new single on the air at WZAD and answers call-ins from fans, and from Mickey Kostmayer who uses the live broadcast to rattle Heat's malign manager.
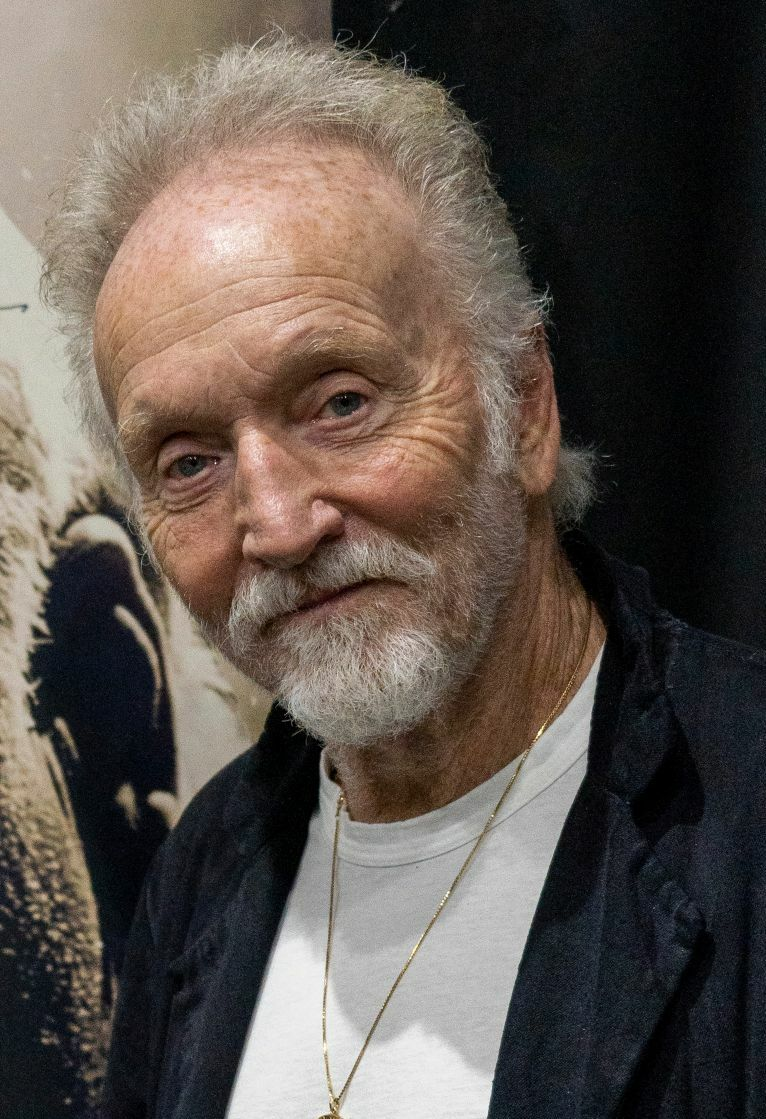
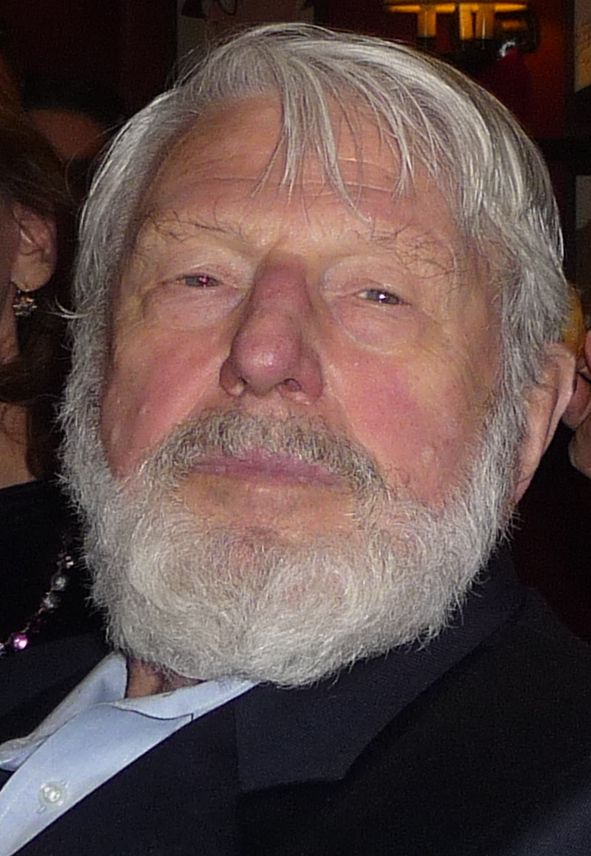
Bikel & Bell
- Kasi Lemmons as Zandili, who is Scott McCall's current girlfriend in "Day of the Covenant." (Note: The episode title "Day of the Covenant" is a reference to the Day of the Vow, an important South African religious public holiday for Afrikaners. It originates from the 1838 Battle of Blood River at which more than 450 Voortrekkers vowed that if God rescued them from 16,000 Zulu warriors they would honor that day as a sabbath in remembrance. In 1994, after the end of apartheid, it was officially replaced by the Day of Reconciliation.) A flautist and student activist, she hides her past, having lost her father to the Department of Cooperation and Development, for which she has a vendetta against the man she holds responsible, who was the deputy director at the time.
- Theodore Bikel as Voorhees, an Afrikaner who has a vendetta against Zandili. whom he blames for the bomb that killed his wife while she was visiting him at his South African Police station.
- Michael Genet as Ben, a fellow member of the African National Congress, who warns Zandili that the ANC will not approve of or abide by any terrorist actions she conducts on American soil.
- Tobin Bell as the Deputy Secretary, the target of Zandili's wrath.
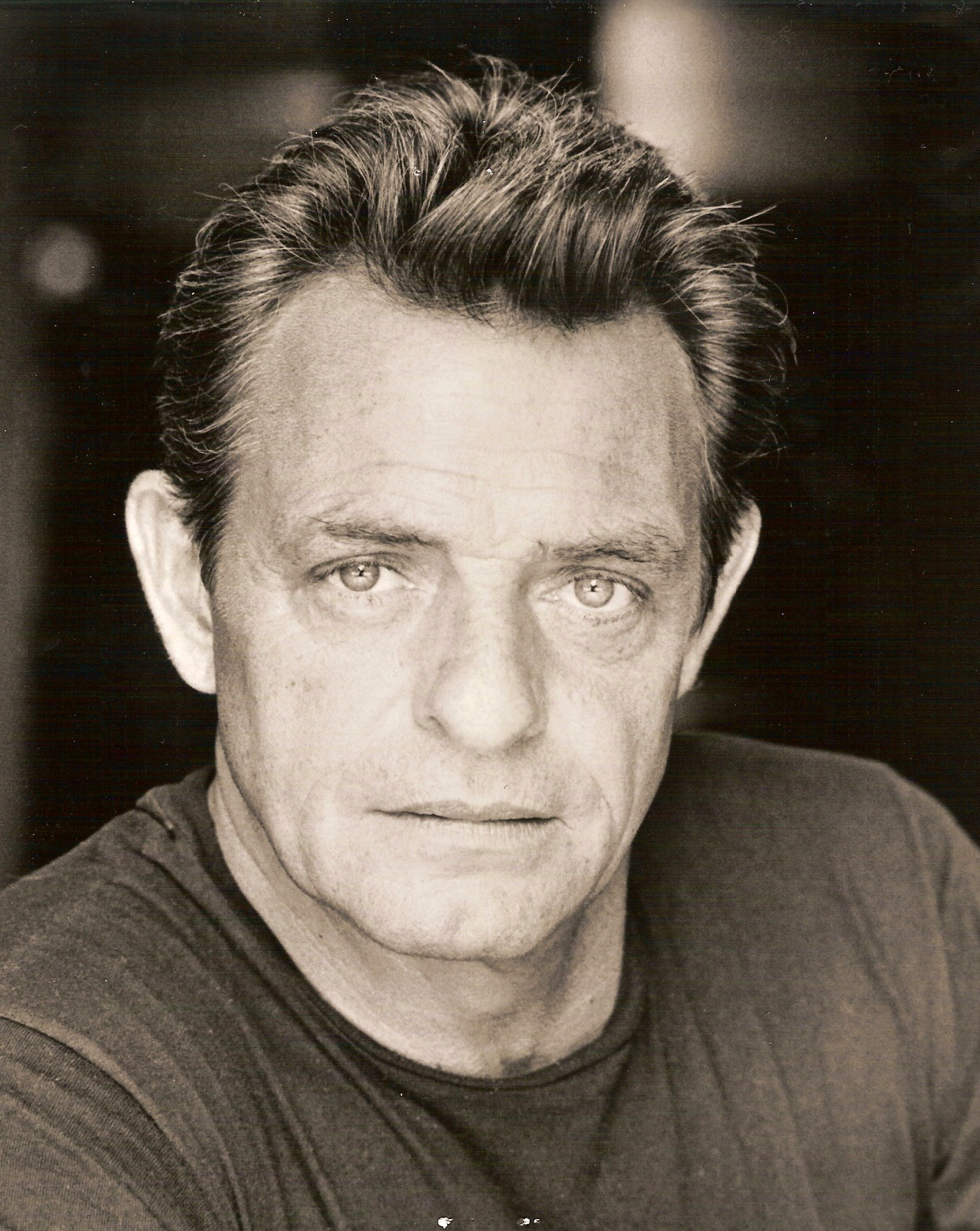
Bright
- Richard Bright as Gropman, a former Company agent, who runs Stone Freight, and tries to escape the purge by his personal friend, Steven Parmelee. When McCall threatens to flush his $50,000 "retirement" fund down the toilet, Gropman reveals the name of the operation.
- Kevin Conway as John Allenwaite, who developed a "Splinters" procedure to break and "repaint" subjects' minds with any colors he wishes (i.e., brainwashing). To take over as Company Director, he has KGB mole Steven Parmelee (Tom Klunis) launch an operation to kill Company agents, forcing Control to contact McCall.
- Tracy Kolis as Serena, Mickey's former lover, whom the KGB murdered for defecting in Bucharest, Romania, 1982. She appears in Mickey's dream sequence under Allenwaite's Spinter procedure.
- Christopher Meloni as Team Leader, in his screen debut.
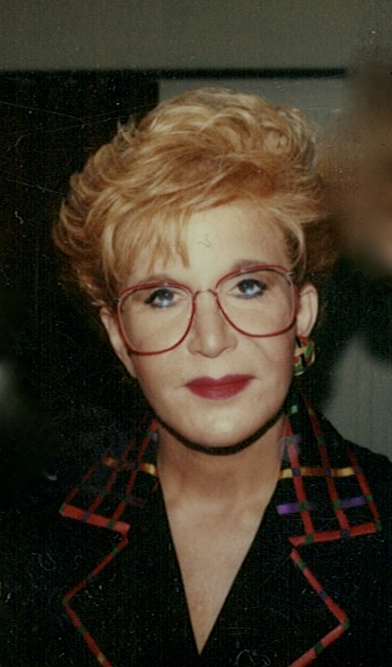
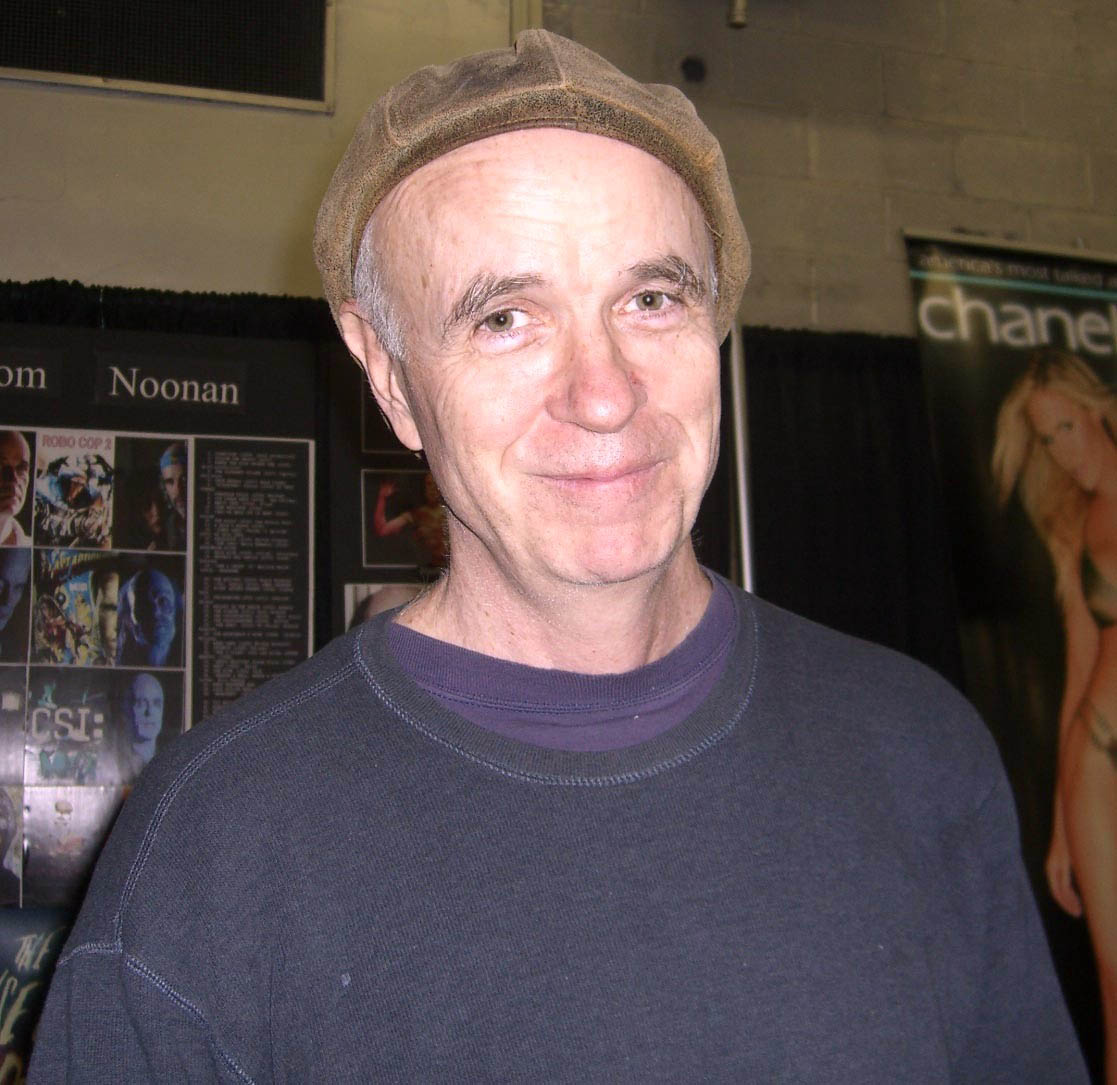
Noonan & Raphael
- Tom Noonan as Brandon Thorton, a victim of gun violence, paralyzed and confined to a wheel chair after a mental patient shot him through a door, who tries to be supportive of his wife Barbara, but pushes her away, believing she no longer loves him because of his broken body.
- Barbara Williams as Sylvia Thorton, Brandon's wife, who has since become a gun control advocate, giving lectures using her husband's injury to drive home her point of view.
- William Converse-Roberts as John Kelly, another gun violence victim, who turned violent, arming himself to the teeth, and setting out to make Sylvia the target of his irrational power trip.
- Sally Jessy Raphael as Herself, in a co-starring cameo, who is set to interview Sylvia in a televised debate against gun advocate Senator Harcourt (co-star, Stephen James).
- Bobby Rivers as Chris Perley, who gives a radio interview with Sylvia leading up to her television debate.
- A.L. Sheppard as a Forensic Detective in "Making of a Martyr," before his recurring role as Detective Kelly beginning in "Lullaby of Darkness."
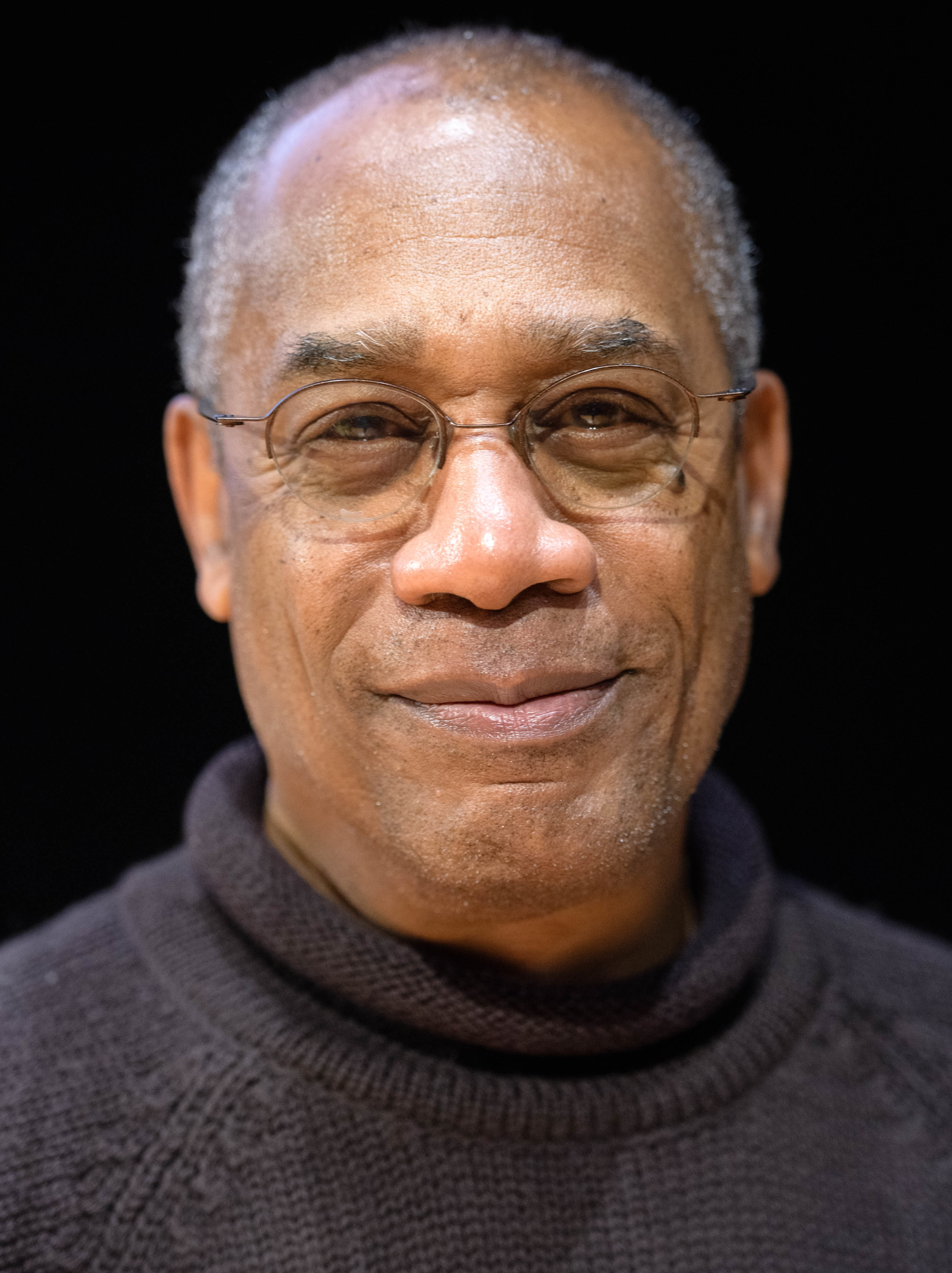
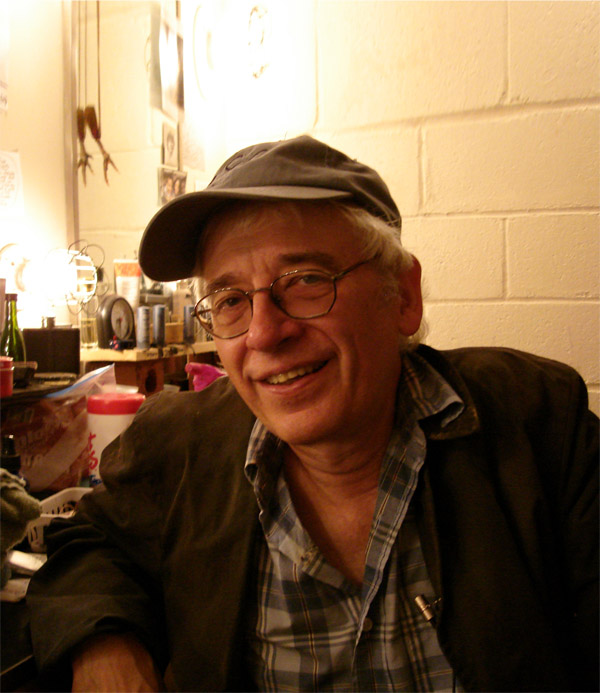
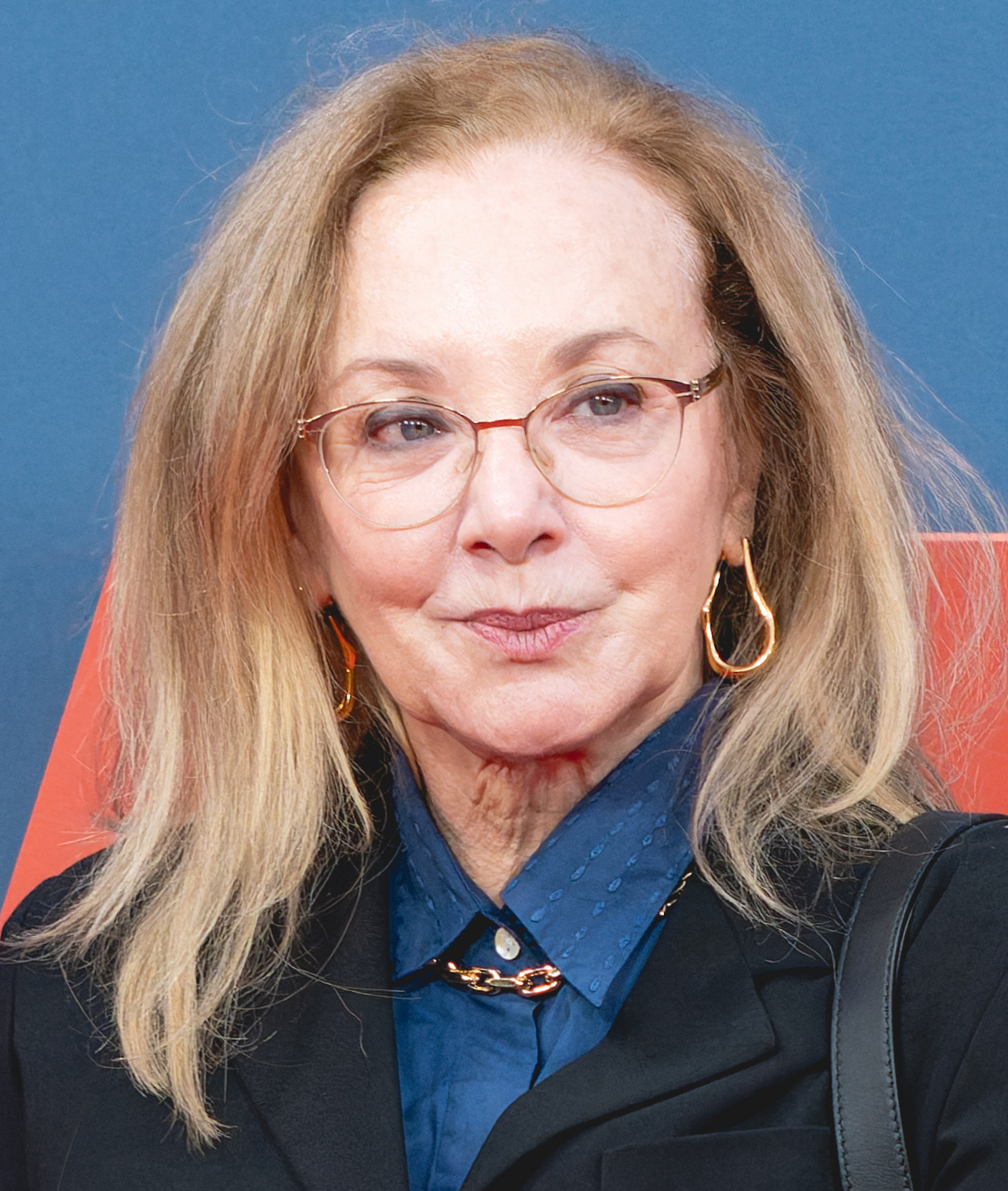
Smith-Cameron, Pendleton & Morton
- J. Smith-Cameron as Natalie Santelli, who is trying to save her son Carlo Jr. (Jordan Gochros) from "The Sins of Our Fathers," as Junior's father is mob boss Carlo Alberto "The Angel" Santelli (Al Shannon). Natalie knew when she married him that his father and grandfather were mobsters, but she believes him when he says that he wants to change all of that and "go legit."
- Randy Danson as Sarah Booth, whose husband and son were shot by Carlo Senior in a restaurant eight years prior, thus she pays for Carlo Junior's kidnapping to make Senior pay.
- Tom Signorelli as Dio, Carlo Senior's right-hand man.
- Austin Pendleton as Johah, Company computer hacker.
- Joe Morton as Carter Brock (or "Brockie" as McCall calls him), a former Company explosives expert turned freelance, who employs ex-military to kidnap Carlo Jr.. Confronted by McCall, he rationalizes, "A guy's gotta eat," struggling after three tours in Vietnam. He provides Sarah's tape cassette recording of the job instructions. Morton appears twice more this season.
- Michael Sergio as Disimone.
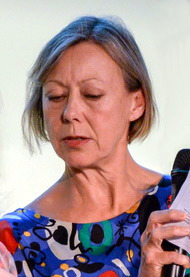
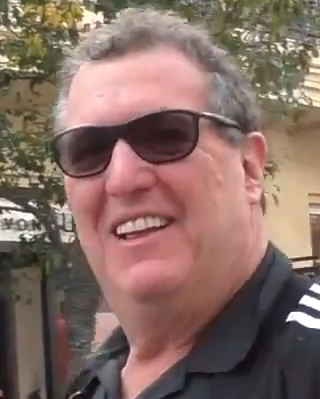
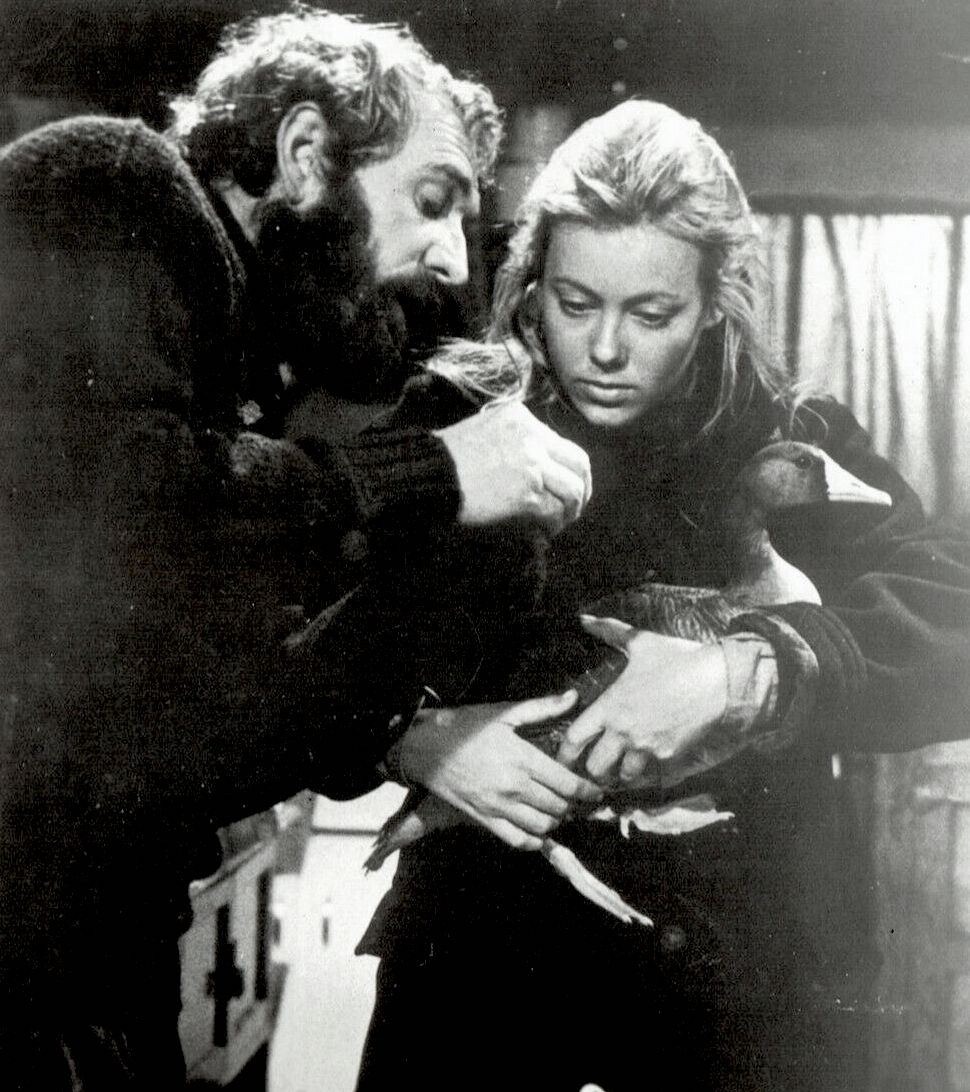
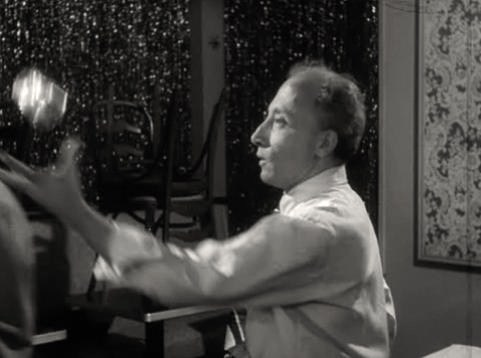
Agutter in 1971 & 2014
Cimino – Starr
- Jenny Agutter as Dr. Lauren Demeter, one of McCall's old flames and an epidemiologist at the U.N.'s International Health Organization, who fights against a contagious deadly virus loosed upon New York City.
- James Tolkan as Daniel Ruger, an international arms dealer trying to sell nerve gas, who has Lazar killed, not trusting his silence.
- Leonardo Cimino as Doctor Phil Molinari, with the Department of Health, Bureau of Contagious Diseases, who helps the Medical Examiner and Dr. Demeter contain an outbreak in "The Visitation." Cimino also advises McCall on the most likely medicine that a paramedic might have access to, which could cause a heart attack in "17 Zebra."
- Martin Shakar plays Harriman, who is Rudy Bagler's cousin and a doctor who lost his license for performing unnecessary surgeries. He now practices "under the table." Shakar also plays the Detective who questions Susan regarding the shooting in "End Game."
- Eddie Jones as Lt. Brannigan, his first of three appearances. Jones had previously appeared as Mr. Winslow in season two, "Joyride."
- Joseph Ragno as Asa Lazar, a small-time gun smuggler, who, having done a few jobs for the Company, wants nothing to do with nerve gas and other WMDs. He carries the virus, himself a victim of a bio-WMD.
- Randle Mell as Tillerman, one of Ruger's thugs, who catches the virus from Lazar.
- Mike Starr as Garrick, one of Ruger's thugs.
- Mel Gorham as a Mother, an illegal immigrant with a language barrier, whose child has contracted the virus; she fears deportation if reported by hospital personnel.
- Ken Solarino as Jeremy, Pete O'Phelan's bartender. Besides credited appearances, Solarino has an uncredited speaking role in "The Visitation."
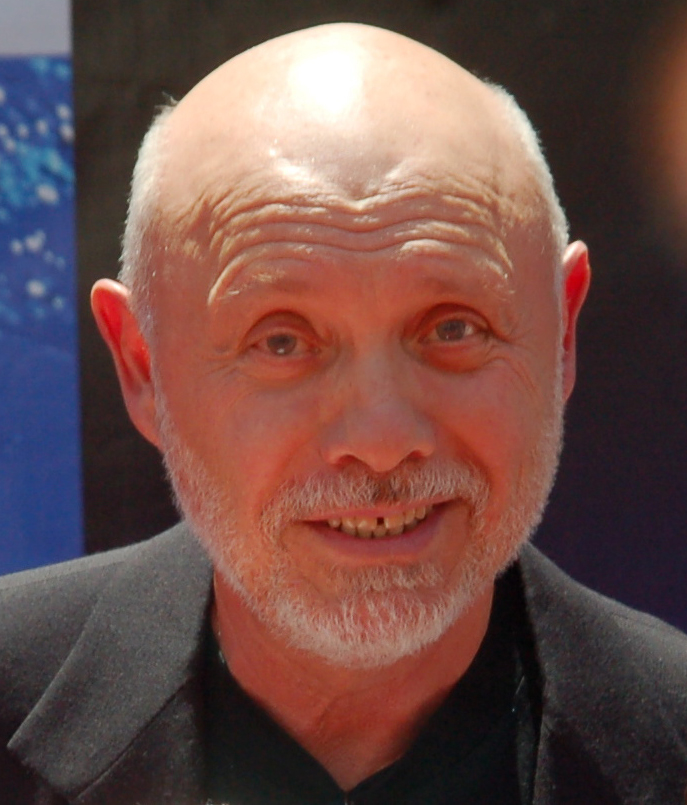
Elizondo
- Katherine Cortez as Cecilia Romero, wife of Ray, for whom the FBI issued an arrest warrant for murder and drug smuggling, leaving her alone as a single mother raising her ten year-old son Thomas (Jose Edwin Soto), who believes his father died a freedom-fighter hero.
- Héctor Elizondo as Ray Quintero, a Company recruit from Special Forces, who got in too deep undercover while penetrating the Darien Cartel, and presently believes he canot extricate himself. He is a person of interest to Federal authorities and the Company, who join forces to end the Cartel. Not believing in heroes anymore, McCall tries changing his thinking, for Thomas' sake.
- Brad Sullivan as Luther Munson, a Company "expert on strange and esoteric information."
- Rudolph Willrich plays Elliott Jarvis, a Justice Department agent who says he wants Ray's testimony, but has another agenda.
- Frank Adonis as the Chauffeur, who tries to kill Ray Quintero.
- Peter Mackenzie as 1st Man, an inept Company surveillance operative who is scolded by McCall and told to report in.
- Al Carmines as the Priest, at Ray's funeral.
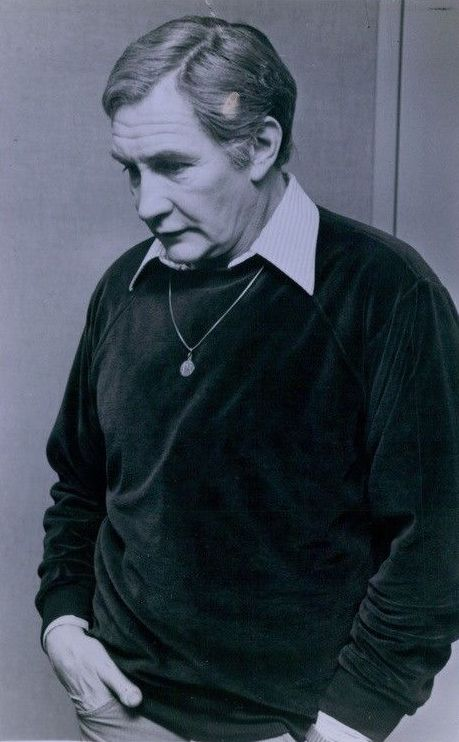
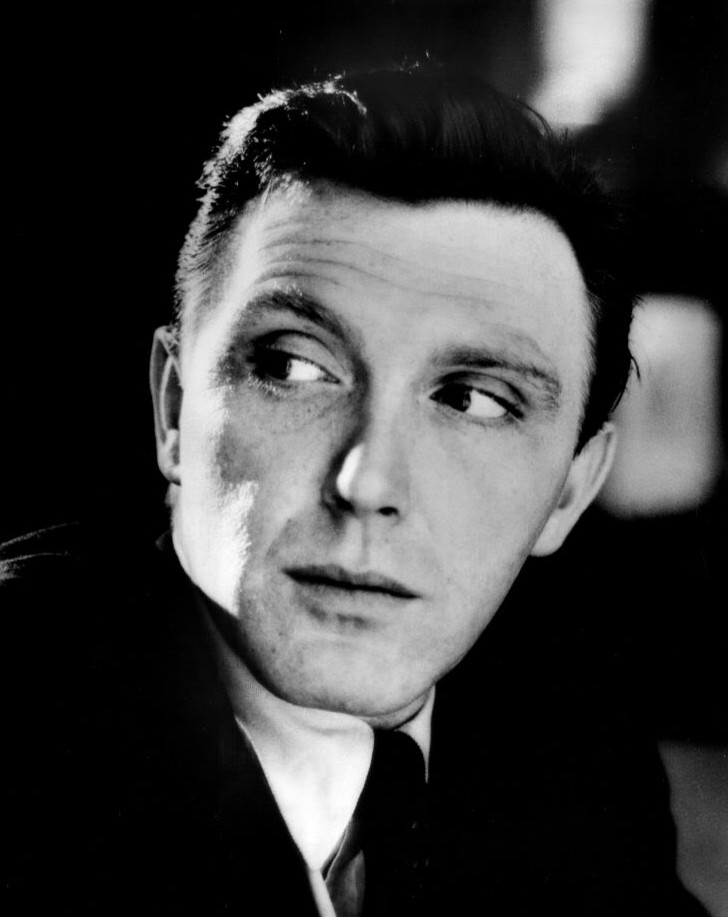
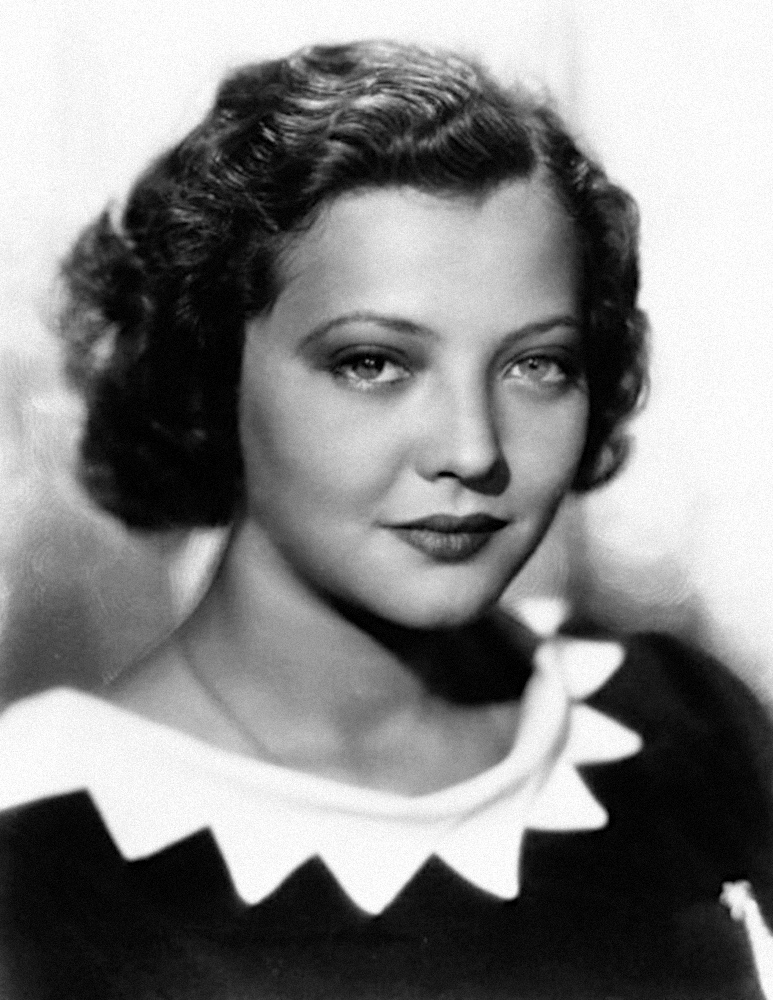
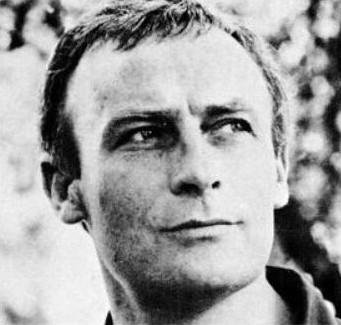
Sidney – Dotrice
Woodward – Lansing
- Sylvia Sidney as the Judge, who puts Control in danger of the hot seat, literally, the electric chair, during a Company "Trial by Ordeal."
- Roy Dotrice as Charlie McGuinness, the tribunal prosecutor at McCall's and Control's hearing.
- Edward Woodward as Robert McCall, believing he is being on trial, soon learns their primary target is Control.
- Special guest star Robert Lansing returns as Control, the defendant, who is charged with starting his own network, independent of the Company but still utilizing its resources for his own agenda. During the course of the trial, footage from previous episodes is introduced as flashbacks to illustrate the evidence the Company has against Control and McCall. It provides a retrospective of the series, while also integrating plot narrative.
- Keith Szarabajka as Mickey Kostmayer, who is called as a witness for the Prosecution to testify against Control.
- Reused episode footage featured actors who were given a second screen credit in "Trial by Ordeal." Jerome Dempsey as Senator Claremont and Kaiulani Lee as Ms. Watson were originally guest stars in "First Light." Sully Boyar as Judge Maurice Sanderling and Virginia Sandifur as Baker were co-stars in "Counterfire," along with Robert Trumbull as Hodges.
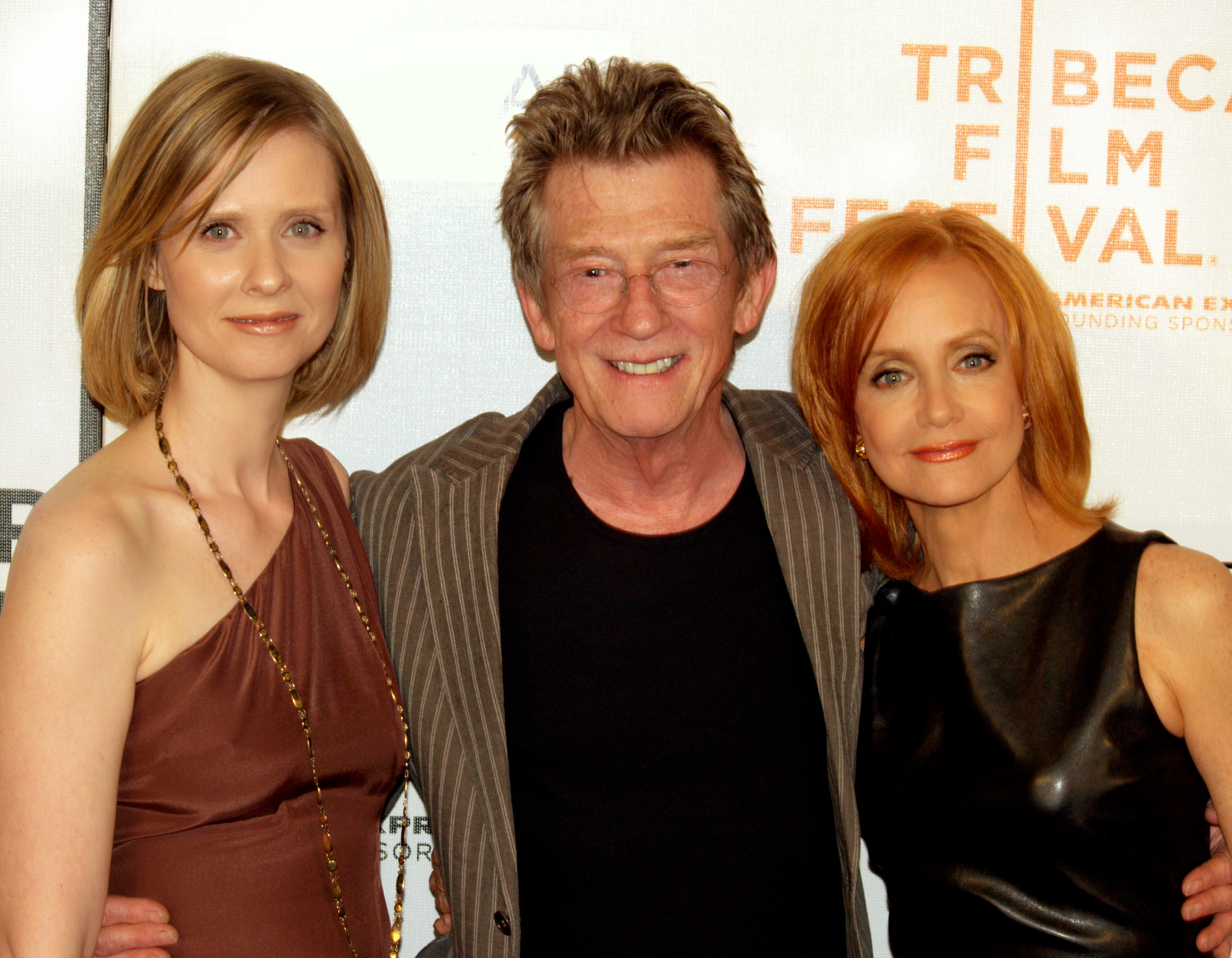
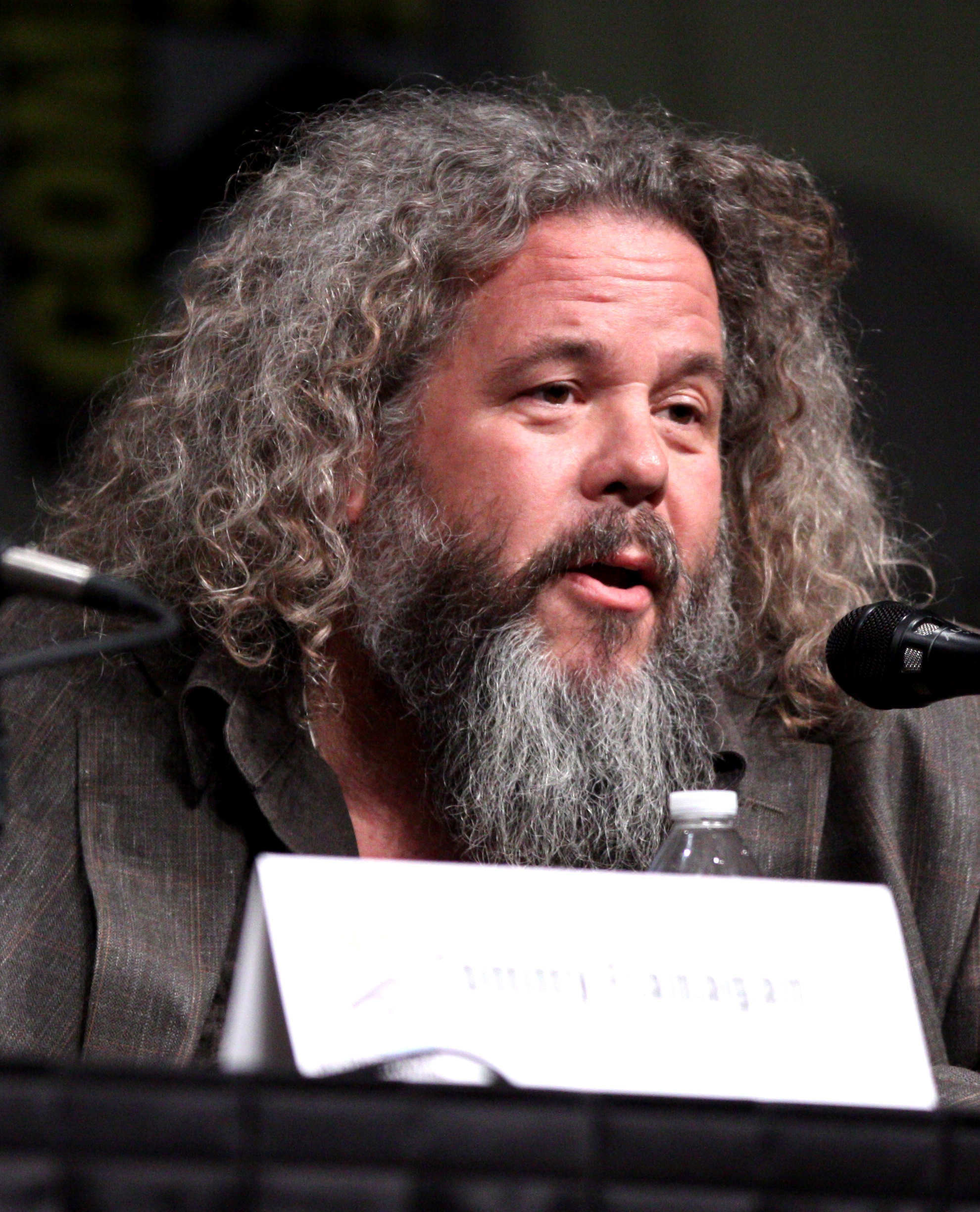
Nixon
Boone Junior
- Howie Seago as Ron, who was born deaf, abandoned by his parents, and grew up in foster homes or homeless. He has a "Silent Fury" against men who held his wife Jackie at knife-point and stole her wedding ring. He distrusts anyone like McCall who is not deaf, even arguing with Jackie, who can speak and does not associate exclusively with the deaf.
- Cynthia Nixon as Jackie, Ron's wife, who lost her hearing after contracting yellow fever when she was eight years old, thus she can speak and read lips, unlike Ron. She calls The Equalizer.
- Jon Polito as David Pfieffer, Ron's friend and a volunteer at the Center for the Deaf. He has a troubled past with his deaf father, whose anger at his condition was redirected at his son. He believes the deaf "deserve everything they get...they all do."
- Paul McCrane as Crocker, one of Pfieffer's pilferers.
- Mark Boone Junior as Hall, another felon who fleeces the deaf, and absolutely will not go back to prison for it. Fearful of being identified by Ron, Hall goes after him.
- Jeff Weiss as Fineberg, a Company scientist rescued from a gulag by McCall. He tests and perfects sound-wave weapons, being pragmatic, not altruistic, "I expected freedom, not utopia."
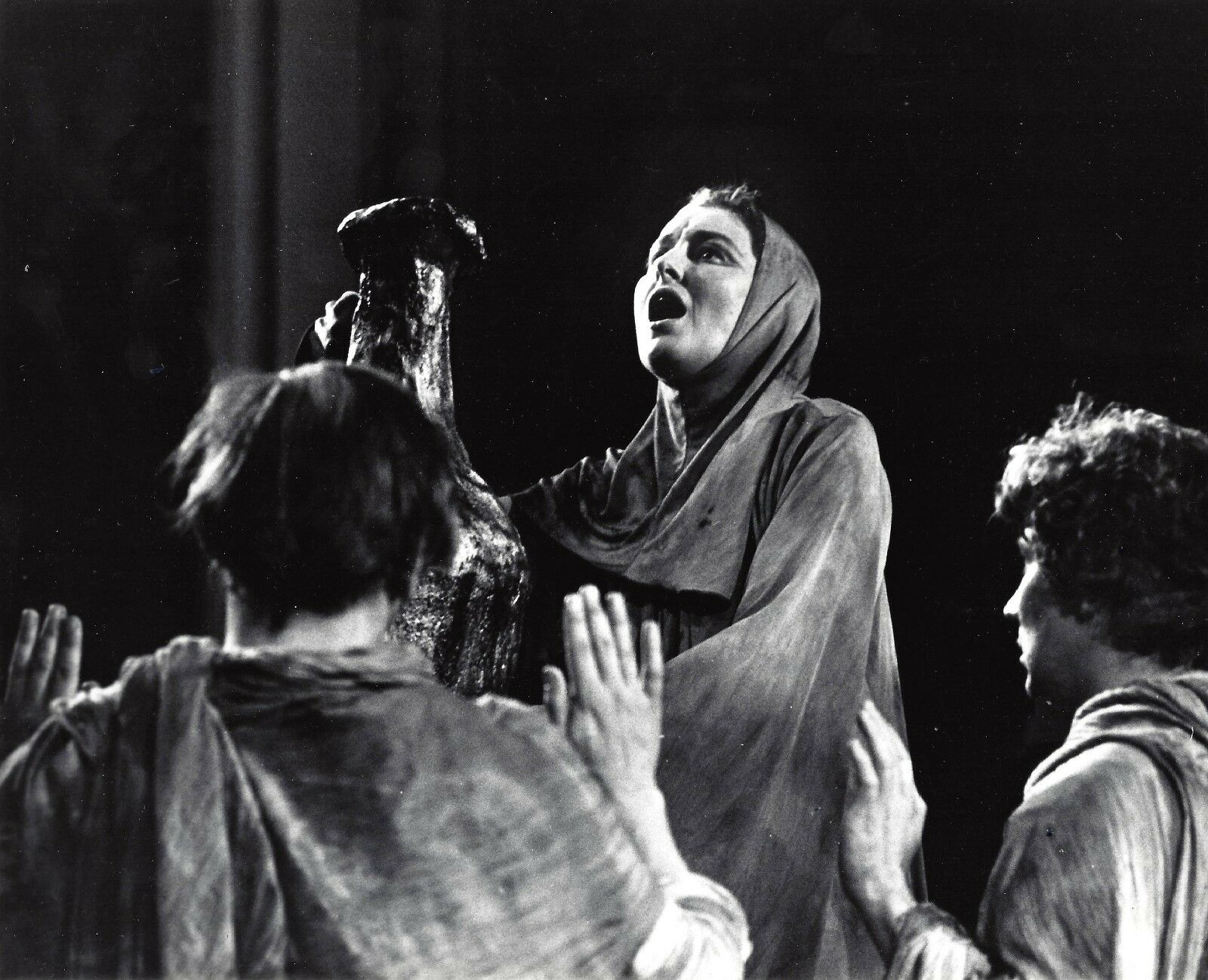
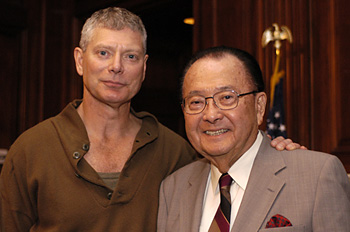
Lang & Brookes
- Mary-Joan Negro as Rebecca Morrison, Joseph's belittled and battered wife, and mother of young Mindy, she has been "conditioned" to stay, obey, and pretend they are the perfect family. She has seizures from repeated head trauma, thus she relies on sedatives administered by Joseph.
- Ellen Hamilton-Latzen as Mindy Morrison, who uses her active imagination to mentally escape the horrible abuse; her dolls "come to life" and tell her to flee upstairs to the Fun Room.
- Stephen Lang as Joseph Morrison, and abusive husband and father, who tells Mindy he "hates disciplining" her but always buys her "a new doll" and the latest is a black-robed sorcerer, which also "comes to life" in a "Lullaby of Darkness" as the sinister avenger.
- Jacqueline Brookes as Dr. Myrna Grayson, a psychologist who hides with hand puppet "Andy the Monkey" who talks to Mindy when she sleepwalks to the Fun Room, while McCall videotapes Mindy's reaction. In this way they obtain evidence of Joseph's abuse, which he shows to Sgt. Shepard.
- Robert X. Modica as The Sorcerer, dressed all in black, hooded and faceless, he asks Mindy "Is there someone you want to kill?" and in her dream, she answers "Yes." In the end, The Sorcerer appears in a "waking dream" and urges her to fly from the top of the building to help her dolls far below.
- Vivian Nathan as Mrs. Drake, the Morrison's worried neighbor, who has twice before called police to no avail, and calls The Equalizer.
- Gwyllum Evans as Dream Father, who along with Dream Mother (co-star, Kate Dezina, who also played Manon in "Memories of Manon" Part 2), comforts Mindy in times of crisis.
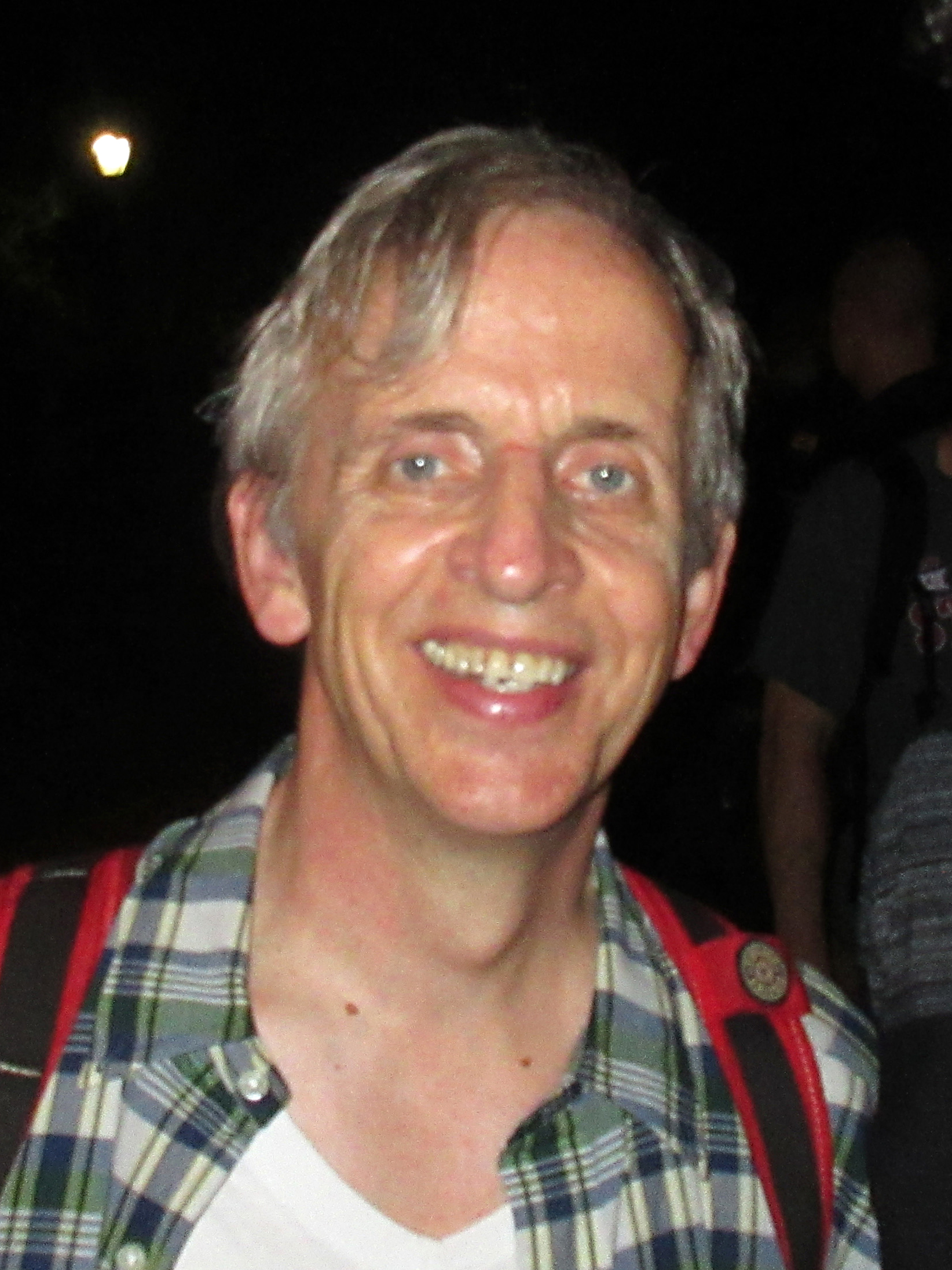
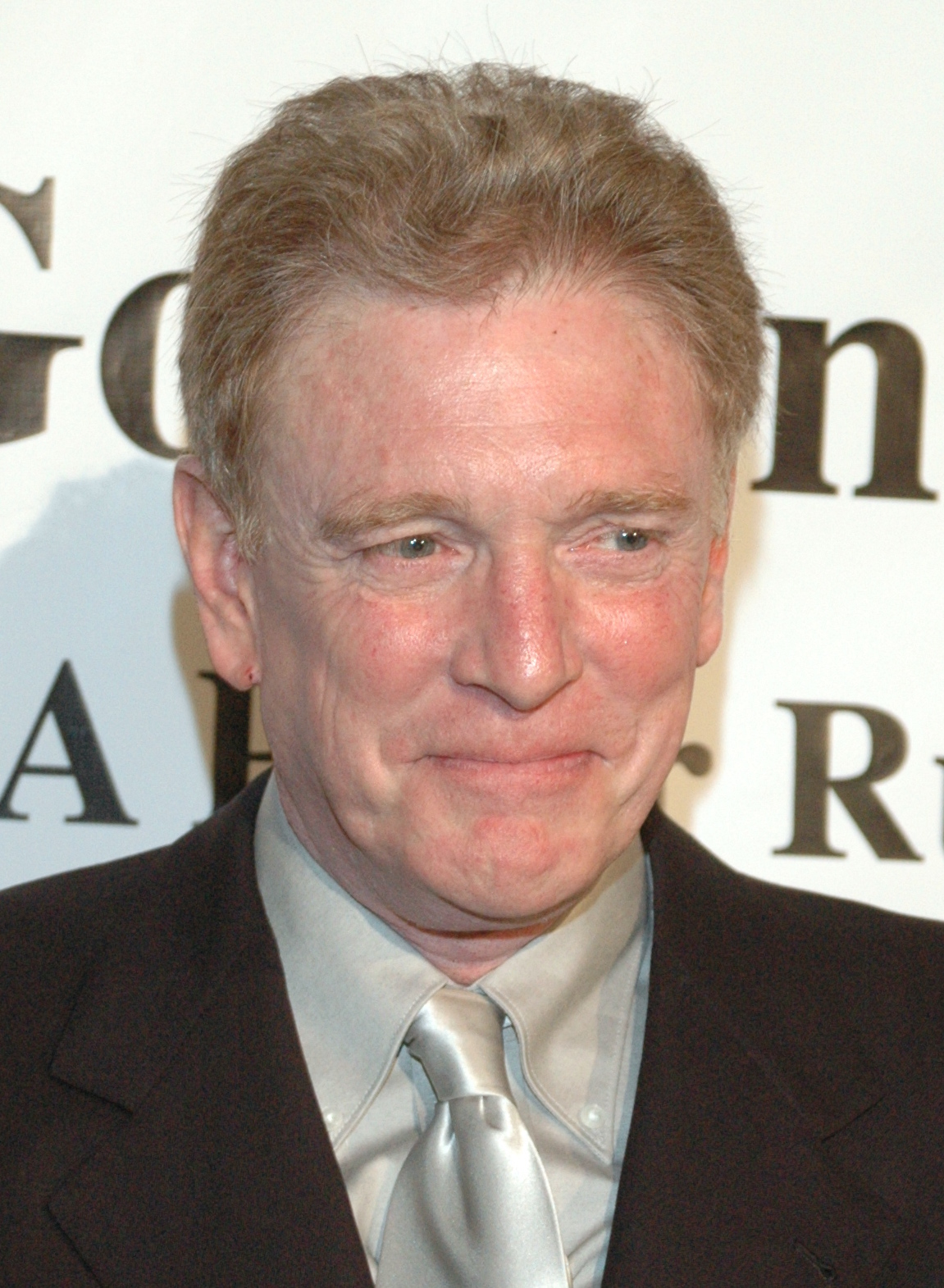
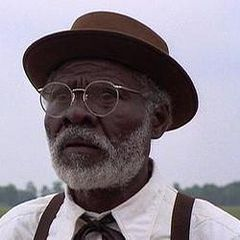
Seneca, Atherton & Joy
- Joe Seneca as Fossil Williams, a spiritual man who quotes scripture from memory and runs the homeless McKenzie Mission in The Bowery. A building Superintendent (Raymond Moy) calls 9-1-1 falsely reporting a heart attack to forcibly removal Lucky (Stephen Payne), who ispassed out drunk, but healthy. Suspecting murder, Fossil calls The Equalizer.
- Cordelia González as Donna Marie Estrelita Concepcion Friedman, a one-year rookie paramedic, whose long Puerto Rican-Jewish name amuses fellow paramedic, Gideon. "17 Zebra" is the dispatcher's call sign for her ambulance team, who affectionately call each other Tonto (Friedman) and Kemosabe (Gideon). Friedman looks up to Gideon, and cannot believe McCall suggesting he may have caused Lucky's death. She eventually helps after observing Gideon's behavior.
- William Atherton as Edward F. Gideon, a twenty-year veteran paramedic nicked named "The Pride" for having been decorated several times. He suffers traumatic flashbacks while dealing with the homeless, drunks, and addicts, suffering from burn-out compounded by a derelict killing a little girl.
- Robert Joy as Jacob Stock, who researches names and commonalities of four fatal heart attacks leading to Gideon. Joy has two more appearances after "17 Zebra."
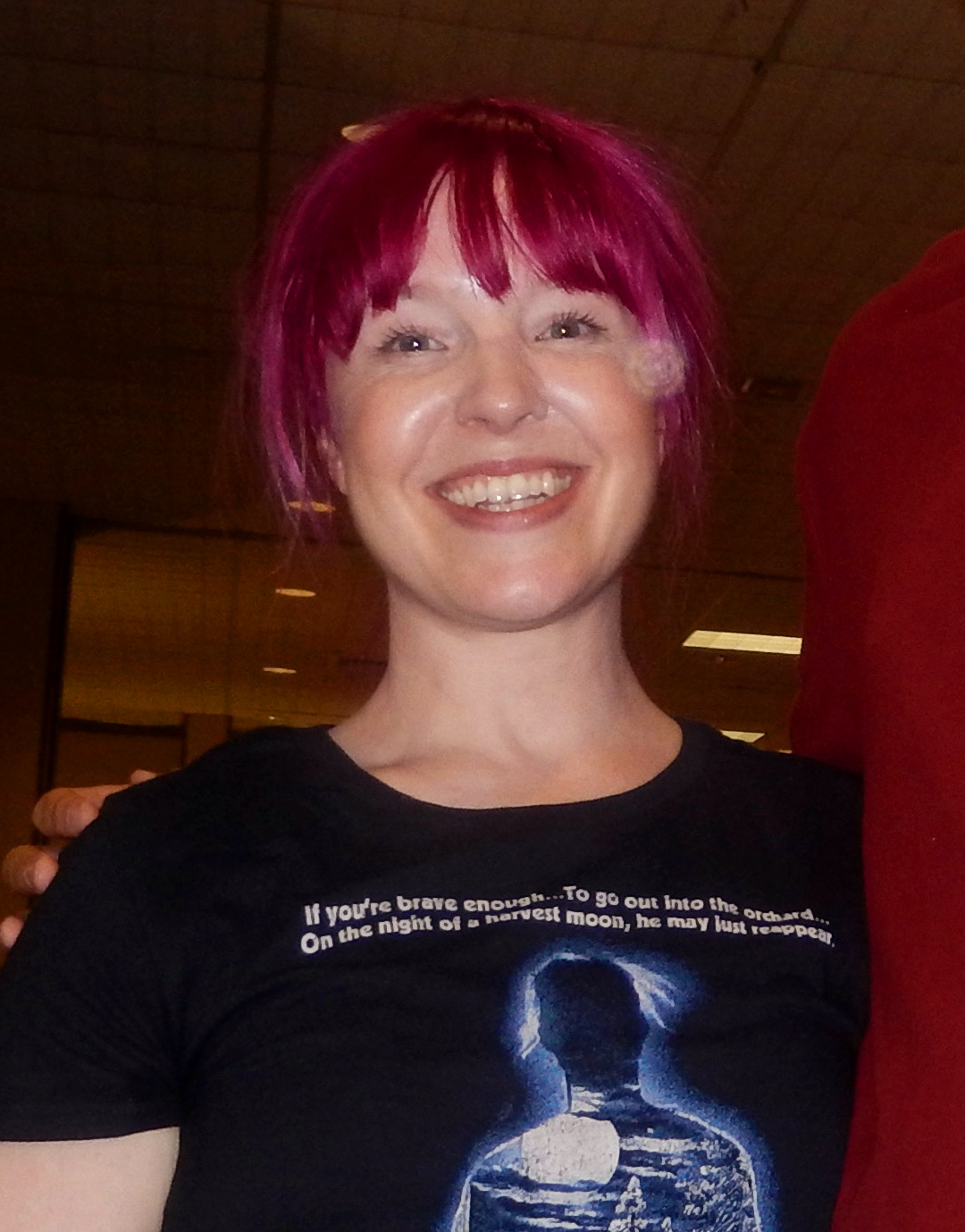
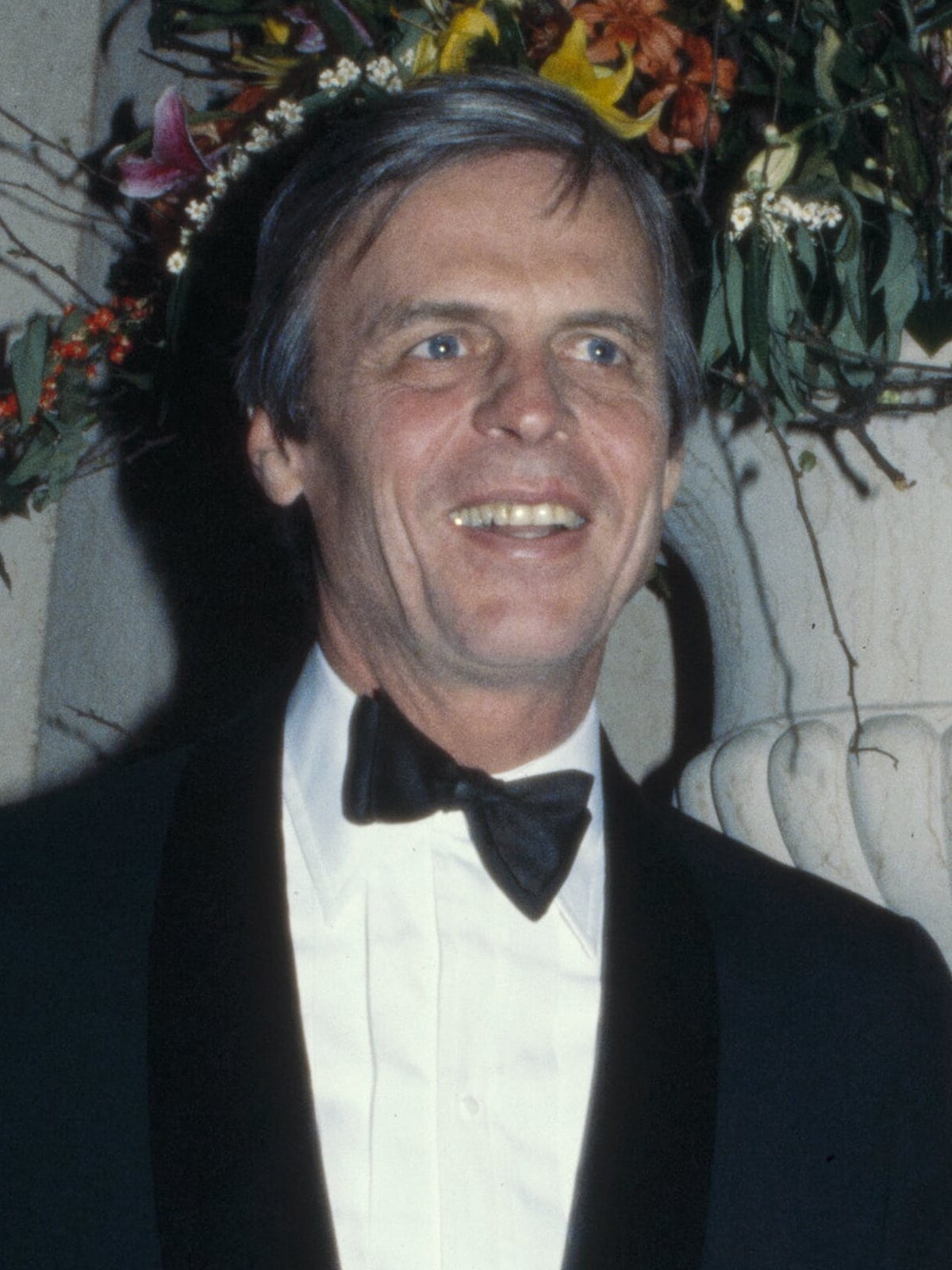
Plimpton & Goethals
- Michael Moriarty as Wayne "Seti" Virgil, an aerospace systems engineer at AeroDimensions, who has a traumatic psychotic break leading to schizophrenic delusions that he was sent from another planet to Earth to stop The Confederation of Vega from enacting an apocalyptic "end times" catastrophe. The trauma stems from unwarranted guilt he feels after a Vega-1 rocket explodes at Vandenberg Space Force Base, killing twelve ground crew. Virgil's self-appointed alias derives from the real-world organization, SETI. Moriarty was nominated for a Primetime Emmy Award for Outstanding Guest Actor in a Drama Series for his role in "Starfire."
- George Plimpton as Clinton Brandauer, who, after Virgil's breakdown, positioned himself as AeroDimensions' new Senior Engineer to profit millions of dollars from merging with Transnational Aviation, assuming the Vega-1 failure is covered up by Virgil's demise.
- Angela Goethals as Amber Sweeny, a young girl who befriends Seti as her new father figure.
- Deborah Hedwall as Claire Sweeny, Amber's single mother who becomes increasingly concerned for her daughter's safety after men try to kill Seti.
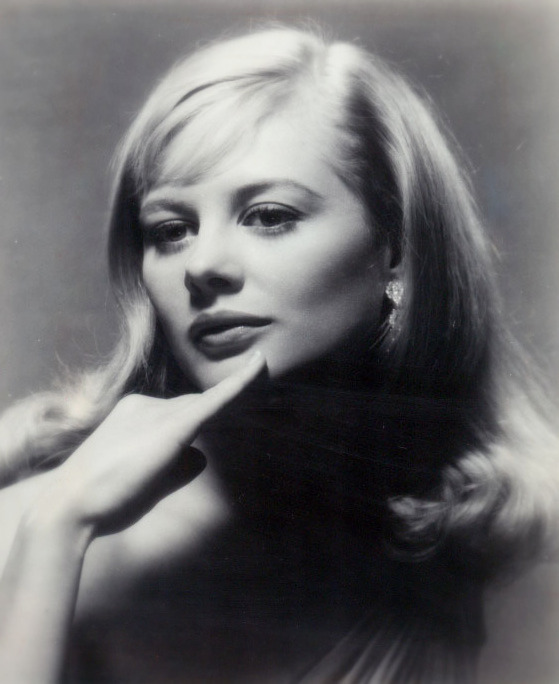
Knight
- Brian Bedford as Harold Ross, his "Time Present... alias after defecting to American ten years prior in "...Time Past" as Emil Kostov, head of Covert Operations for Bulgarian Intelligence. As a musicologist, Ross is helping Scott McCall's studies after Robert McCall's introduction. Emil's defection causes family problems in Bulgaria for younger brother Yorgi.
- Dennis Boutsikaris as Yorgi Kostov, who followed Emil into intelligence work and must prove his worth and loyalty, determined to bring Emil back to Bulgaria for trial and execution to restore the family name. Scott is captured when Yorgi abducts Emil to the Bulgarian Embassy.
- Shirley Knight as Kay, who is angry at her ex-husband Robert McCall for their son Scott's abduction, and cannot understand introducing him to an ex-spy, placing him in danger. She abhors Scott following Robert's violent path. Knight was nominated for a Primetime Emmy Award for Outstanding Guest Actress in a Drama Series for her role in "Time Present, Time Past." Previously, the role of Kay was played by Sandy Dennis in "Out of the Past."
- Barry Primus as Walter Wesley, Kay's new husband.
- Tom Mardirosian as Arnoff, a Bulgarian agent working with Yorgi.
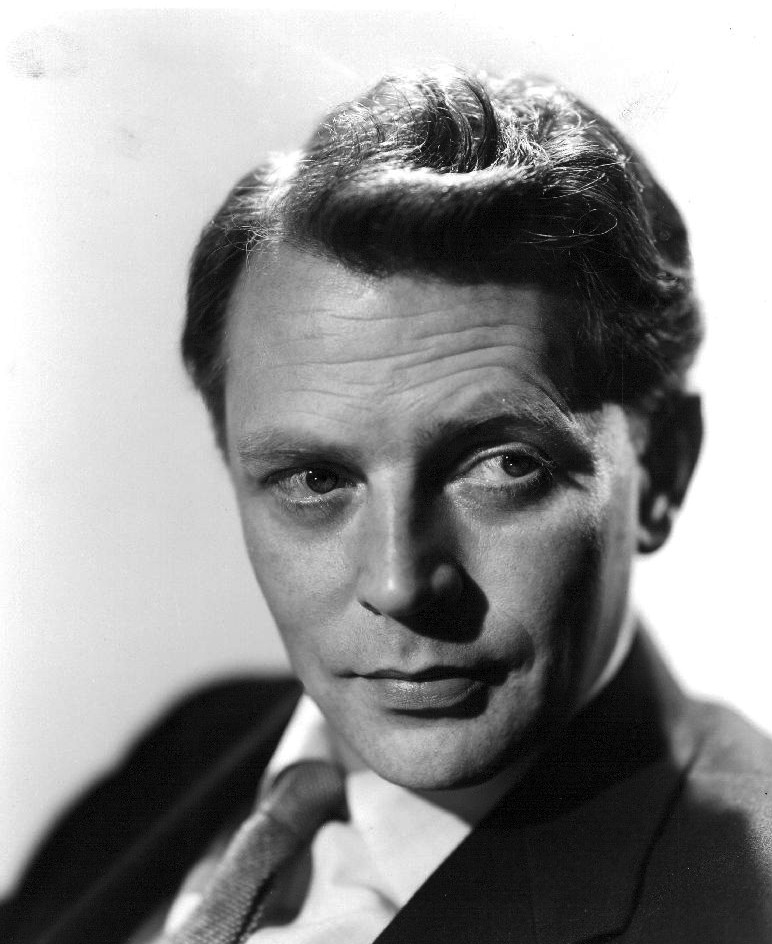
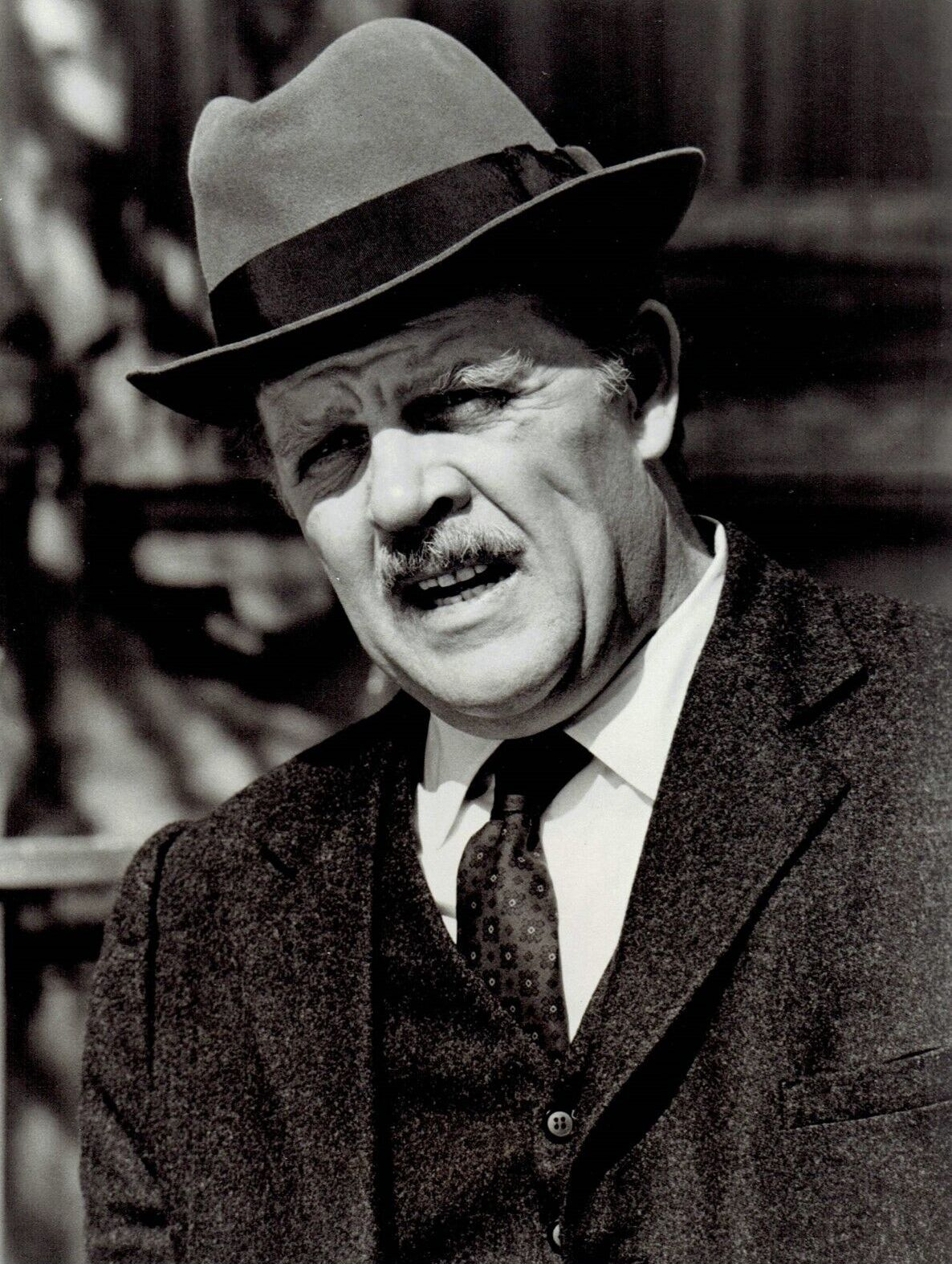
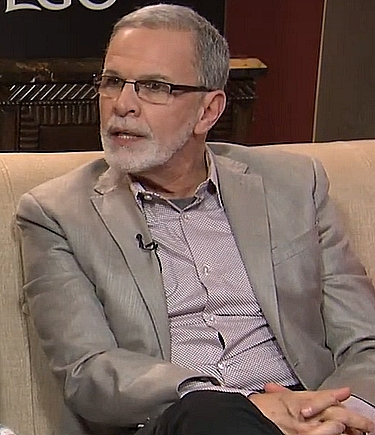
Plana, Hingle & O'Herlihy
- Pat Hingle as Waldo Jarrell, a university teacher, and former Hollywood screenwriter, blacklisted during the McCarthy era. The humiliation of jail and "naming names" estranged him from his son for forty years. He pleads McCall to save his fellow "Prisoner of Conscience" and surrogate son "Tony" from death.
- Tony Plana as Antonio Cruz, a Chilean poet jailed by Central Nacional de Informaciones, the secret police and intelligence agency guilty of kidnapping, torture, murder and disappearance of political opponents during Augusto Pinochet's military dictatorship. Having fled to the United States, Cruz attends university and encourages Waldo Jarrell to begin writing again.
- Tim Woodward as William McCall, Robert McCall's father who was murdered during the 1952 Egyptian revolution at Port Said next to the Mediterranean end of the Suez Canal. William was a captain with the British Army responding to the coup d'état against King Farouk. William appears in a flashback to Robert's childhood, and again as an imaginary/ghost figure with whom Robert converses inside Pete O'Phelan's bar. Robert tells Control he had searched for William's killer for twenty years, but gave up after being told by the Company that Randall Payne had been gunned down. Robert is furious to learn he has been lied to for the past fifteen years, and that Randall Payne is not only still alive, but also working for the Company.
- Dan O'Herlihy as Randall Payne, who is in New York to torture Antonio to force him to "name names" so that he can change the outcome of the up-coming Chilean elections.
- Jaime Tirelli as a CNI Operative, who works for Payne. Tirelli also played Ramon Scavosa in season one "The Lock Box."
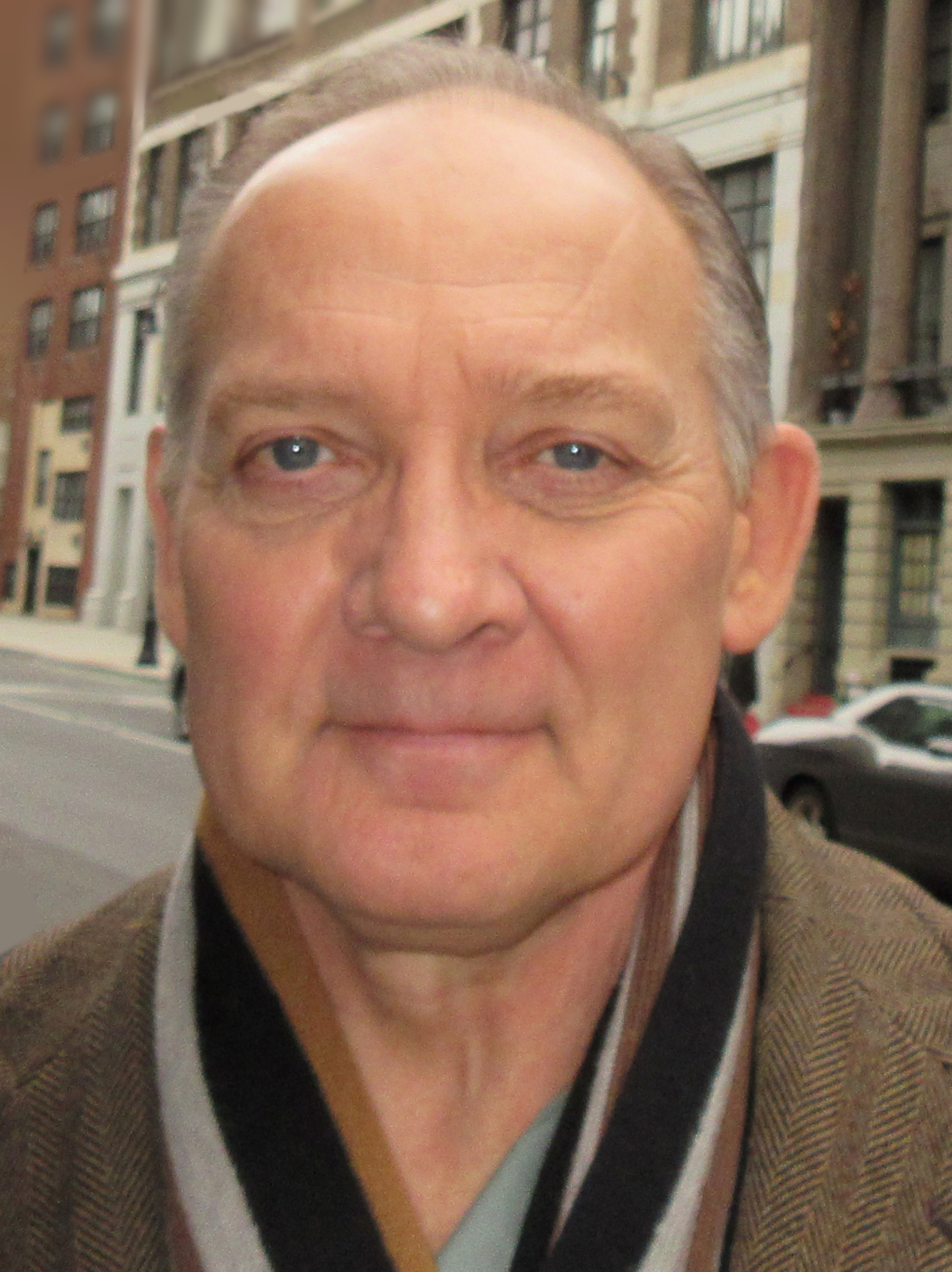
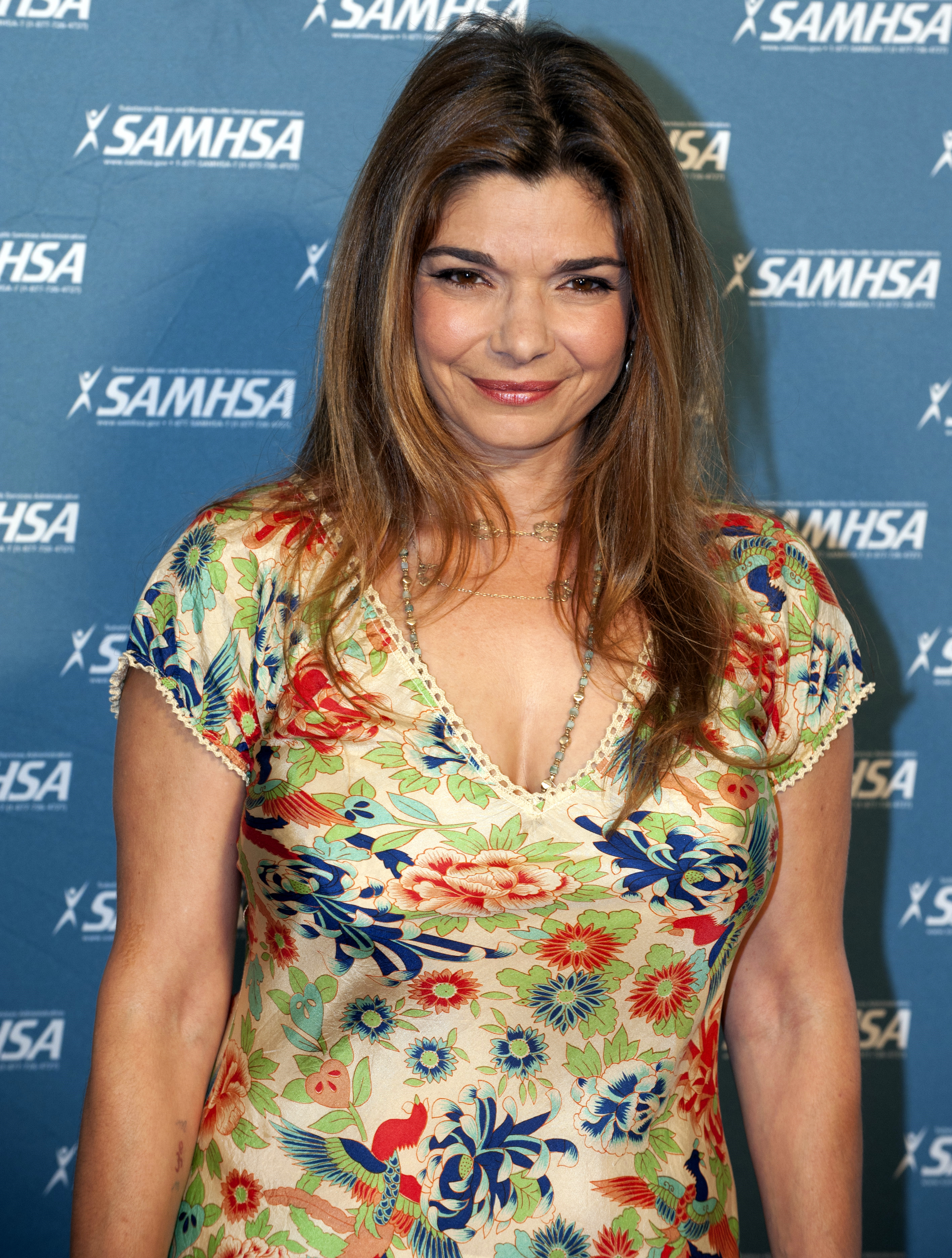
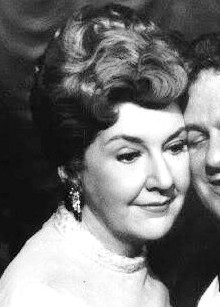
Stapleton, San Giacomo, & Grenier
- Maureen Stapleton as Emmy Rutherford, a cleaning woman and avid detective novel aficionado who gets caught up in "The Caper" that puts her in danger after witnessing a man's murder. Sgt. Alice Shepard is dubious of Emmy's latest claim, having called police numerous times reporting crimes derived from her overactive imagination.
- Laura San Giacomo as Trudy Collins, the young energetic and eager Company agent McCall assigns to guard Emmy. Graduating top of her class in marksmanship, her skills are put to the test.
- Richard Hamilton as Frank, Emmy's neighbor and handyman who would prefer that Emmy get her nose out of her books and pay more attention to him. Frank's life is also put in danger by Emmy's obsession to solve the murder herself.
- Alberta Watson as Taffy Gould, an exotic dancer and Kenny Pack's girlfriend, who has a secret she withholds from McCall.
- Michael Wincott as Jarrow, a British criminal who runs an international crew.
- Lewis J. Stadlen as Danny, a small-time criminal out on parole who McCall leverages for information.
- Zach Grenier as Kenny Pack who is the killer Emmy witnessed.
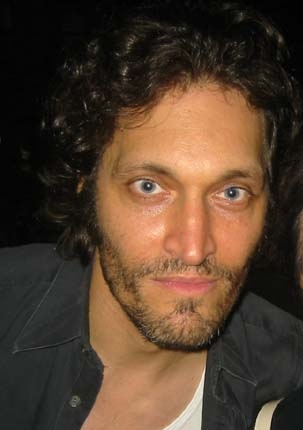
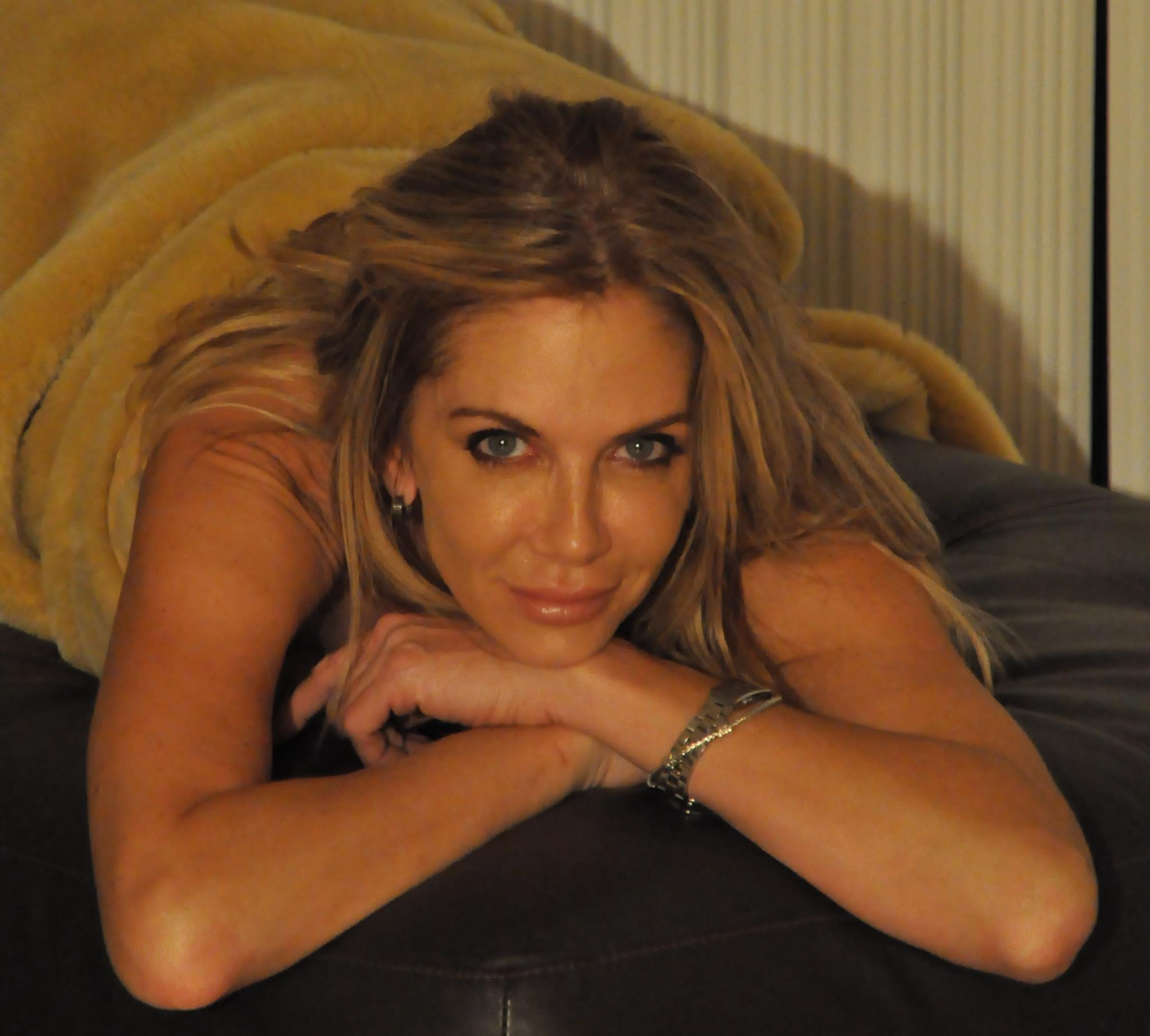
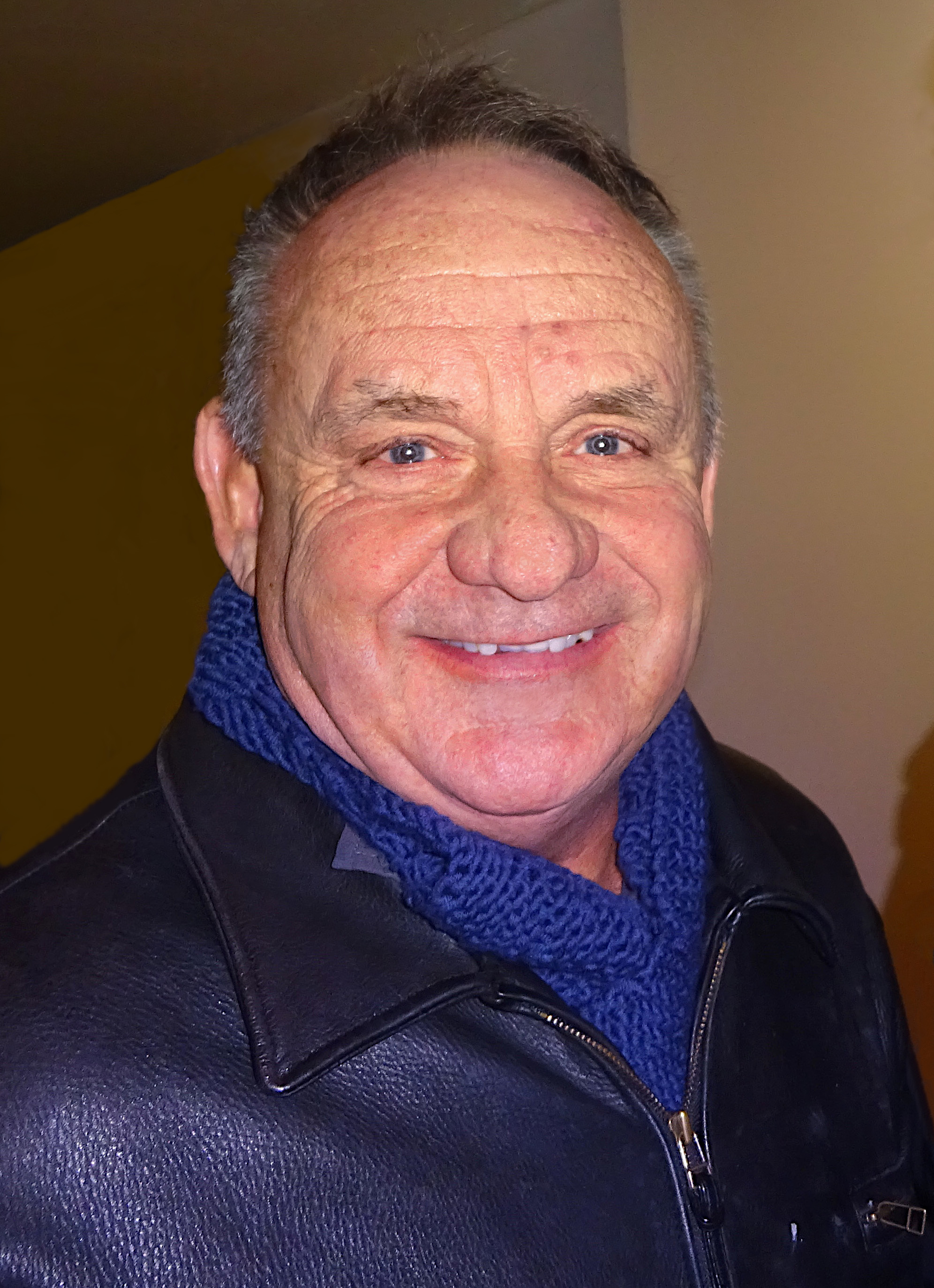
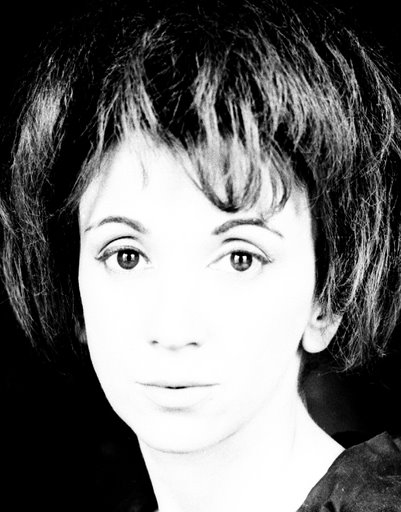
Guilfoyle – Gallo
Malina – Mullen
- John Shepherd as Michael Gianelli, who seeks the "Heart of Justice" against low-life thugs who gang raped his wife Cynthia and beat her into a brain dead coma to silence her testimony. A peaceful man, Michael struggles to enact vengeance.
- Paul Guilfoyle as Max Gorman, an ailing drug addict and rapist.
- Joseph Hindy as Victor Koslo, whose wife and child were killed by violent men. Koslo has become a heartless vigilante killer who monitors the courts for violent criminals released on technicalities, seeking his own vengeance.
- Margaret Klenck as Laura, who contacts The Equalizer to prevent Michael's vengeance and ensure her sister Cynthia's unborn child is delivered before she dies.
- Philip Bosco as Oscar, who works in the Criminal Data Analysis division of the Company. McCall tries to leverage his extra-marital affair to wrest a favor, but Oscar says his wife already knows. So McCall instead warns he'll reveal his mistress as a Cuban double-agent to elicit Oscar's cooperation.
- Roberta Maxwell as Justice Lindsey Smith, who by law must unfortunately dismiss the rape case because the car search was technically illegal.
- Vincent Gallo as Tony Santiago, who raped and beat Cynthia.
- Judith Malina as an Old Woman, who witnesses Michael Gianelli aiming a gun at Tony, but does not see Koslo.
- Patty Mullen as Teresa, Oscar's mistress who he believes is named Michelle.
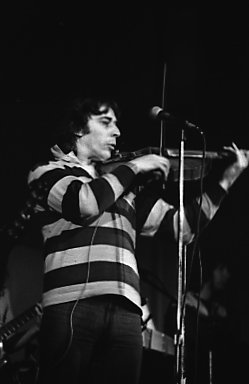
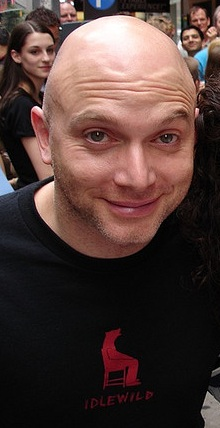
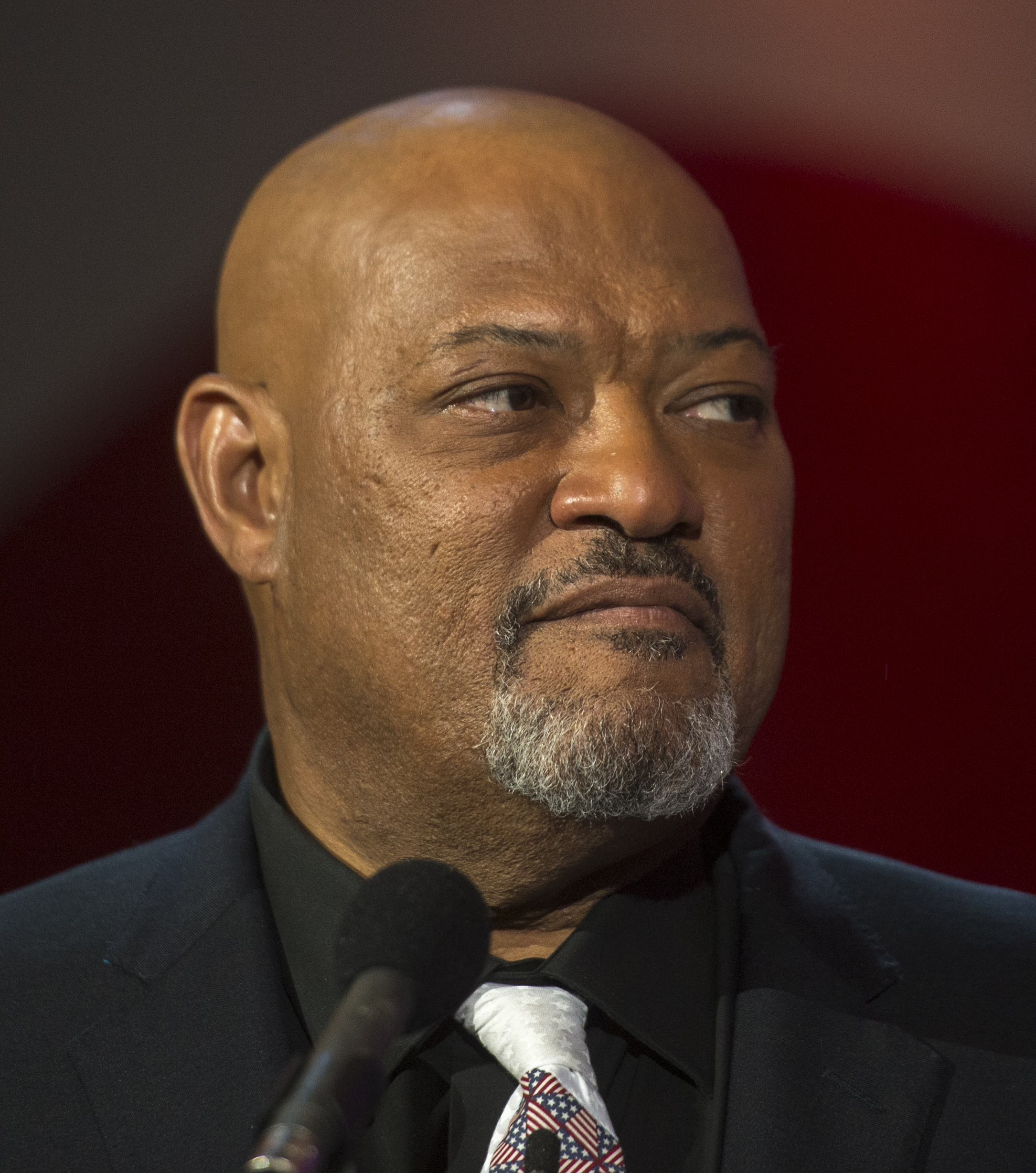
Fishburne, Cerveris & Cale
- Laurence Fishburne as Casey Taylor, a law-abiding teacher who moves from an expensive but run-down city apartment to a better neighborhood. Skinheads pour white paint, saying the only way he can live in their neighborhood is to be white.
- Aleta Mitchell as Martha Taylor, who calls The Equalizer when her husband Casey threatens to buy a gun and take care of the skinheads himself. Martha is also concerned for the safety of their baby.
- David Andrews as Dale Stevens, a low-level member of the KKK who vows to lynch all "Race Traitors" when the "day of the rope" arrives. Stevens is a "community" organizer who wants to set up his own network in multiple cities while liaising with other neo-Nazi groups to instigate race riots. Stevens gives speeches to indoctrinate, radicalize, and rally young working class locals like Nick Kaminsky and Chuck to join the skinhead ranks and carry out violent attacks.
- Morgan H. Margolis as Chuck, an active skinhead cell member Stevens is trying to control.
- Michael Cerveris as Nick Kaminsky, an embittered youth and a neophyte skinhead, who wants someone to pay for the death of his brother, John, who was shot to death two months prior by a black man committing a robbery at his mother Ellen's tavern, with only $100 in the register.
- Verna Bloom as Ellen Kaminsky, Nick's mother and tavern operator, who does not hate the Jewish owner she leases from, but remarks on declining local businesses, which she partly attributes to the influx of "the blacks." She works with Mickey to disuade Nick from skinhead hate and vengeance.
- Caroline Kava plays Barbara Ashton who quit the Company, and whose son McCall and Mickey once helped. She creates a backstory for McCall's new identity as a powerful European Nazi to stop Stevens.
- Bruce Hubbard as Detective Warren who helps McCall in the investigation and arrests the perpetrators.
- John Cale as an unnamed Aryan Leader, from whom Stevens is petitioning financial and political support to expand his own network and power base.
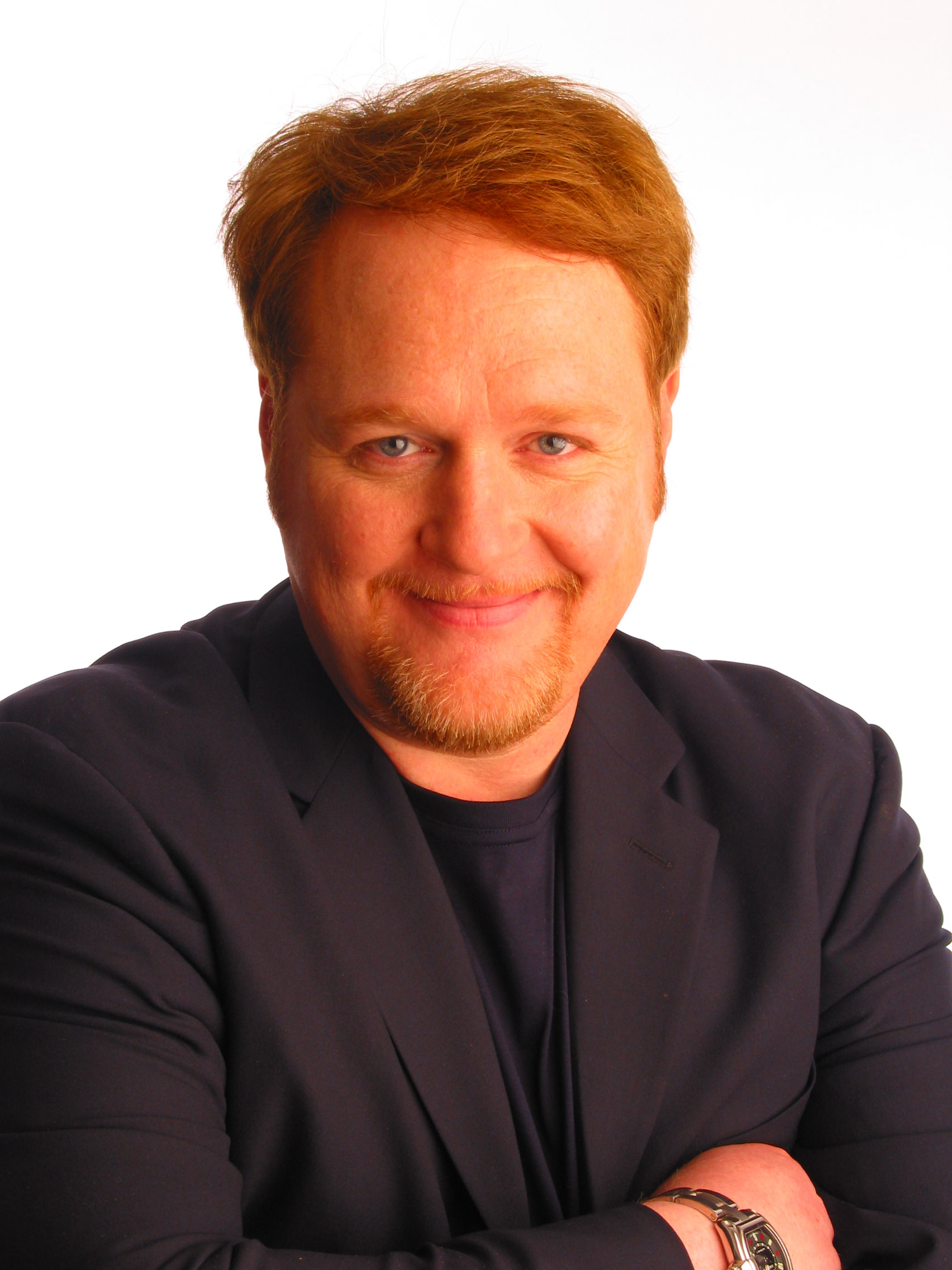
Bakay
- Elizabeth Berridge as Susan Wilhite, an intended victim in an "Endgame" planned by Rasher.
- Josef Sommer as Ernest Rasher, a wargame strategist, whose son was a U.S. Army Colonel imprisoned for stealing weapons to sell on the black market. Linda Wilhite (Amy Morton) was responsible for his incarceration five years prior. Rasher's son hanged himself in jail, so he wants revenge and hires Dodd to frame Linda's jealous sister Susan for murder, rigging her paintball gun to fire a .44 Magnum cartridge, killing a random opponent. Rasher kills Dodd and frames Linda for it, then reveals a terrible secret about Susan to Linda, hoping Linda will either kill her sister and be convicted of murder, or commit suicide like his son.
- Lewis Van Bergen as Stuart Dodd, the hit-man Rasher hires to kill Susan.
- Nick Bakay as a Yellow Team Member of the paintball group.
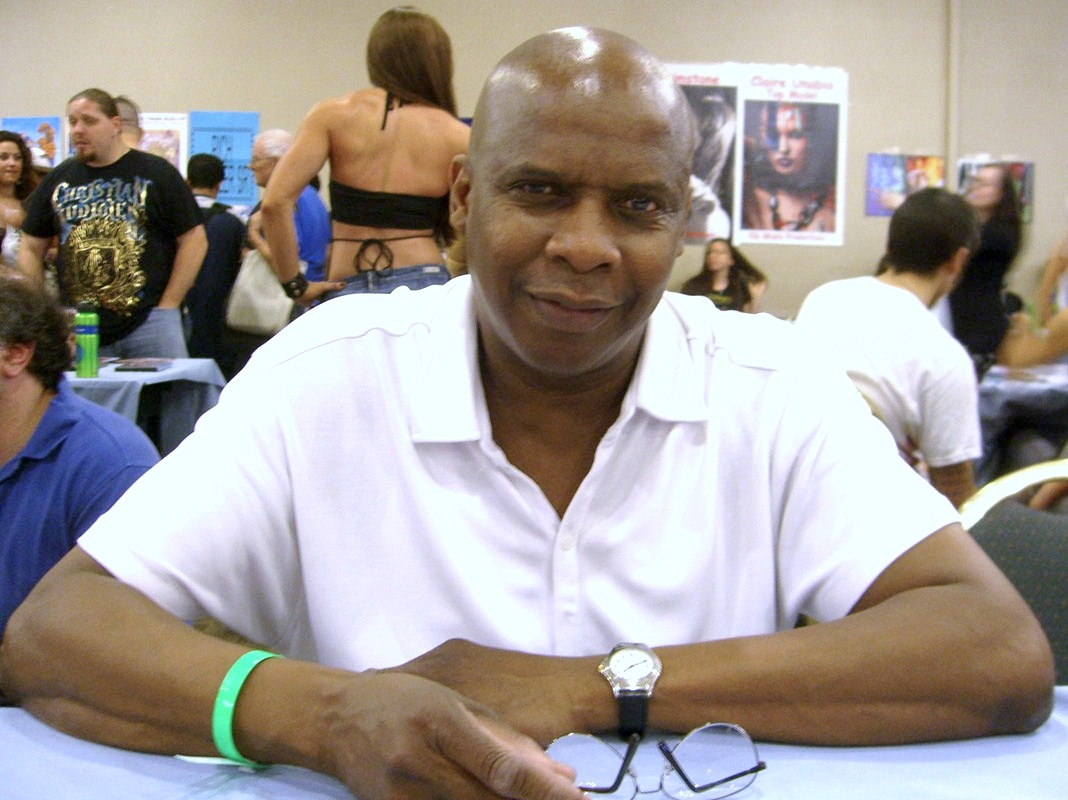
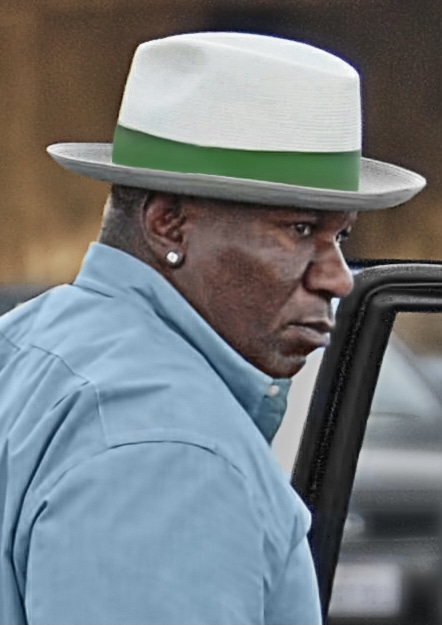
Rhames & Harris
- Ving Rhames as Luther "Million" Paxton, who uses his hooligan "Suicide Squad" of former athletes to "run interference" in drug deals with his buyers, keeping himself clean of direct involvement. He launders proceeds through Cayman Islands accounts back into his health clubs, running his drugs out of his flagship 47th street gym. He enjoys corrupting athletes like Willie because they, "think they own the Earth...I love their expressions when they realize they're just as dirty as everyone else." Million manipulates Willie into his Suicide Squad, with no way out but self-destruction.
- Adam Coleman Howard as Willie Halsey, who fails at academics (1.7 GPA), struggling to finish his papers, half of which are written by his sister Mary Lou Halsey (Alyson Kirk). With a bad knee hampering athletic performance, he fears losing his athletic scholarship, and not even graduating. Mary Lou, who knows Hammer sells to students, calls The Equalizer.
- Robert Swan as Joe Halsey, Willie's father, who suggests Willie make an honest living at his sign business. But Joe's business is declining, and he wants a better life for Willie, pushing him harder than he should, not recognizing he may lose Willie to the "easy money" of "thug life" dealing drugs.
- David Harris as Hammer, one of Million's minions who is known around the school as "a regular supermarket" from which athletes buy performance-enhancers such as anabolic steroids, and "anything else" he might have.
- Regina Baff as Kitty Halsey, Willie's concerned mother.
- Leo Burmester as Coach Bell, who has limited football scholarships slots. He cuts Willie from the team to allow a better performer to succeed. McCall convinces Bell to reinstate Willie until he improves his grades.

== Cancellation ==
The Equalizer was initially renewed for a fifth season (causing Keith Szarabajka to turn down a role on Midnight Caller). However, the show was later canceled due to a dispute between CBS and Universal Studios over the renewal of Murder, She Wrote.
