= The Equalizer (1985 TV series) season 2 =

The Equalizer
- Season 2
- Season 2 American DVD cover
- Starring: Edward Woodward; Keith Szarabajka
- No. of episodes: 22

Release
- Original network: CBS
- Original release: October 8, 1986 – May 27, 1987

Season chronology
- ← Previous; Season 1 Next → Season 3

The second season of The Equalizer premiered on CBS on October 8, 1986 and ended May 27, 1987 after 22 episodes.

== Synopsis ==
In season two, McCall faces Agency operatives who go too far, over-zealous vigilantes, a corrupt judge who abuses women, corrupt cops who abuse women, more than one hit-man, more than one mobster, crack cocaine drug dealers, heroin smugglers, a lunatic mercenary, a vengeful prisoner of war, gang rapists, an arsonist, a con-man, a con-woman, bookies, kid-nappers, baby-nappers, KGB provocateurs, gunrunners, extortionists, sex-ploiters, a peeping Tom, a serial killer, and of course thieves and robbers.

He saves an operative from suicide, clears Control in a Senate inquest, saves two marriages, saves a boy from using a gun, bails out a gambling addict, rescues a teen from pornographers, rescues an invalid from her own family, and tries his best to save a drug addict.

McCall helps Mickey help his Father-brother, takes Control as a client, and learns he has a daughter by a former lover.

He loses one love interest to an assassin, confesses what he does for a living to a second, saves a third from a murder rap, and is psychoanalyzed by a fourth.

== Episodes ==
No. overall	No. in season	Title	Directed by	Written by	Original release date	Prod. code	Rating/share (households)
23	1	"Prelude"	Richard Compton	Carleton Eastlake	October 8, 1986	62310	17.0/28
Dictator General Astiz, for whom Robert McCall engineered a coup, kidnaps American journalist Frank Morrow. His daughter Jenny asks McCall to rescue him. McCall tracks down Jacob Stock, who is in his surveillance van with Alex, to ask him about Urgate, Strossner, and Captain Vincente. Stock, "Try The Paradise." McCall tries a con; he feigns indignity about the price of the drink from the bartender. Implying he needs work, McCall convinces Vincente he'll make Frank talk, in order to reveal his location. He finds Frank's torture sanctioned by Agency operatives Eric and Stoller, so he confronts Control. Scott isn't pleased with his father for what he did in the past for the Agency. Robert says he doesn't really know the world enough to judge him. McCalls goes after Frank's abductors with a little help from Jacob Stock, Alex, Lieutenant Elmer, and the press.
24	2	"Nocturne"	Richard Compton	Carleton Eastlake	October 15, 1986	62304	17.5/28
Music critic Kate Parnell hears a man's voice in an elevator. She cries, "It's him! Stop him! Don't you hear him?" "Who, dear...Who?" asks a kind woman. "The man that did this to me!" – blinded, by a rapist eight years ago. Detective Lt. Isadore Smalls hasn't much evidence, but provides McCall the police report. Hearing an intruder, Kate's friend Susan calls McCall, who grills the doorman Jeremy about his missing keys. Company agent Logan, who is suicidal after a failed mission, tries protecting Kate. Matters worsen when Kate reviews Nick Ashford and Valerie Simpson performing a hit single, "Count Your Blessings," from their new album. Someone shoots at Kate during their performance. McCall cashes a chit from computer expert Joshua to create a voice simulation, and Smalls sends an APB. Former police officer Julian Coe hears the APB at Crime Division and leaves. McCall asks Coe's secretary about the voice. McCall and Logan race to intercept the suspect.
25	3	"A Community of Civilized Men"	Alan Metzger	Daniel Pyne & Scott Shepherd	October 22, 1986	62301	12.9/21
The widow Julia Jacobs is pressed by Mr. Cooper to pay her husband's debts. She asks McCall for help after collectors Michaels and Wirth vandalize her business. McCall, "IRS keeping you busy?" Wilhite, "Giving new meaning to, 'Uncle Sam wants you!'." Wilhite looks at Cooper's books. McCall warns Cooper. Grateful, Julia wants to get to know McCall. Preparing for his date, McCall finds a novelty from Adultarama; a signal to meet. A peepshow girl shows him to a private room; Control's there. He wants the Genesis list. McCall finds Julia murdered. Her daughter Valerie Jacobs can't understand why, and, "Who ARE you?" McCall suspects Valerie is being targeted by a third party, a ghost named Zahn. While McCall is surveying a bombing, police officers Webster and Cook ask Valerie to come to the precinct for questions. Out of the safe house, Zahn grabs Valerie, forcing McCall to confront Zahn.
26	4	"Joyride"	Russ Mayberry	Jim Trombetta & Charles Grant Craig	October 29, 1986	62308	14.4/26
Teens Michael Winslow and Steve take a hearse on a joyride, but are unaware of the crack cocaine in the coffin. Steve tries to find a buyer through their friend Rachel. Mike's mother Ruth Winslow calls McCall for help, so Mike and Mr. Winslow show McCall the hearse, which now has a dead body in the casket. Before Control can find out, McCall pays off a gambling debt for Company agent Sonny Raines. In return, Sonny gives McCall intelligence on the hearse owner Norton R. Selby. McCall bugs Selby's office at his funeral home, and Jimmy records him. McCall and Raines go to find Steve and the drugs, and calls Det. Smalls when they find Steve dead. McCall and Raines go after Aurelio and Selby. McCall tries to save Rachel from herself.
27	5	"Shades of Darkness"	Donald Petrie	Jack V. Fogarty	November 5, 1986	62307	14.1/24
National Guard Lieutenant Dan Turner sees deranged mercenary Rick Dillon escape after murdering Nancy Polinski. Leo Barnes witnesses Dan over Nancy's body. After being arrested, Dan's priest Father Martin O'Donohugh, who was with McCall in the army, contacts The Equalizer for help. Judge Paula G. Walsh releases Dan on his own recognizance, angering Nancy's father Frank Polinski. Dillon tells Dan he is going to hunt him, and he starts with Dan's sister Lorraine. Martin takes McCall to see a recruiter to identify the mercenary, and the hunt is on.
28	6	"Nightscape"	Aaron Lipstadt	Carleton Eastlake	November 12, 1986	62315	15.7/27
Three men in the subway brutally gang-rape Amanda Kaufman. She asks McCall to stop her husband Jim from exacting revenge. McCall suggests she talk to a friend, so she calls Zena. He asks Det. Smalls for computer access so his hacker contact Jonah can determine the suspects' routine; rob first, drink next, rape later. McCall intercepts Jim, just as he is about to shoot Ricky Franklin, Time, and another punk for harassing a woman. They are the wrong guys, but "vermin just the same." Jim leaves as police arrive. One of the rapists robs a watch from a guy and stabs him before committing their next rape. McCall and Amanda find Jim, and she reveals that she knows why he is so angry. McCall gets a tip from a bartender and races to intercede before the gang can rape Zena. McCall finally opens up and admits what he does for a living to his new love interest, Allison. "There's always one who wields the Sword of Damocles."
29	7	"Counterfire"	Alan Metzger	Scott Shepherd & Coleman Luck	November 19, 1986	62312	16.0/26
McCall walks into a bar, where a comedian does his act; poorly. McCall meets Teddie's waitress Anne Fitzgerald who asks him to protect her from being killed. He tracks down Terry, a hooker who's been putting Anne's name in the obituaries. She says it was joke from her john, Thomas Marley Jr.. Elderly blind conman Tom Clark fakes being hit by McCall's car, and a newsvendor berates him. Marley frames McCall for Clark's murder. NYPD Detective Lieutenant Kramer interrogates him. At arraignment, Judge Maurice Sanderling denies bail, but Control arranges a distraction to extract him. Marley reports his progress to his incarcerated father. On the run with his face in the newspaper, his cabbie Mosley calls it in. After Marley tries to kill Anne, she tells McCall that Clark gave her that alias, and her real name is Diane Snyder, but is it really? McCall races to thwart Marley and clear his name.: Includes Miguel Pinero's last screen appearance, as a Drunk.
30	8	"The Line"	Russ Mayberry	Steve Volpe	November 26, 1986	62309	15.9/28
McCall is called by Miriam Blain whose son Randy is killed accidentally by five men of the West Grove Citizen's Patrol. They lie to Lt. Vocek saying Randy was committing a crime. Jimmy gathers intel on patrolmen and local police who try to set up McCall. When they fail, patrolman Al Weaver goes after Miriam in her home and she kills him in self-defense. Her son Eugene tries to buy a gun from local thug Jumpin' Jack. Patrolmen Vic Roselli and Lou Marsh receive blackmail photos, so they suspect patrolman Ben Carrigan, and they turn on each other. McCall intercedes when Vic tries to kill their leader, Marty Bennett.
31	9	"Tip on a Sure Thing"	Donald Petrie	Scott Shepherd	December 3, 1986	62302	16.2/27
McCall starts his day while Warner Wolf announces horse racing news on television. The OTB teller gives a dizzying array of choices. McCall, "Can one just put money down on a horse to win a race?" OTB teller, "Sure, but it isn't as exciting." Even Harvey has an opinion on who will win. Maria Rivera, the wife of jockey Luis Rivera, calls McCall after a bookie named Chance has his associate Pike kidnap their son Roberto in an attempt to fix the outcome of a horse race between Survivor Too and Notaquita. McCall enlists Sonny Raines' help, who leads them to his own "blind" bookie Barry. Notaquita's trainer, Oscar Peabody tries to encourage Luis, but Mr. Greenleaf learns of Roberto's kidnapping and tries to cash in as well. McCall and Ronny must find Roberto before the race begins to save him from being killed.
32	10	"The Cup"	Mario DiLeo	Story by : Andrew Sipes & Carleton Eastlake; Teleplay by : David Jackson & Carleton Eastlake	December 10, 1986	62311	16.4/27
Mickey's brother, Father Nicholas Kostmayer hears Stephen Olenski's criminal confession right before a drive-by shooting. A policeman confirms, Stephan is dead. Mickey and McCall watch the Argentinean soccer match as newscaster Diane Waters interrupts with details of the shooting. After a second attempt on Nicholas, his Bishop demands police protection from Lt. Elmer. McCall and Mickey learn that Stephen was part of a Polish group that was infiltrated in a KGB plot to discredit Solidarity using a false-flag assassination. Nicholas slips out, allowing Spetsnaz commander Monica another chance to kill him, but McCall and Micky intercede. They all race to a conference for the new Russian Ambassador Sikora to thwart the plan.
33	11	"Heartstrings"	Russ Mayberry	Loraine Despres	December 17, 1986	62314	15.4/25
Tommy, the newborn son of Vanessa Daniels, is kidnapped by a nurse. Nurse Franks calls security, and the Chief of Administration Eugene Whitman meets Vanessa just as FBI Agent Frank Carter arrives. Carter predicts a ransom or disturbed person as the motive, but Vanessa rules it out and calls The Equalizer. McCall suspects an illegal adoption broker, so Mickey distracts hospital personnel while McCall checks maternity records. He learns that the client for Tommy is Hector Kouros, and Whitman arranges the adoptions. Control warns McCall that Kouros is an Agency asset, and thus off-limits. The kidnapping nurse calls Vanessa to meet, but it's a trap by Norrell. McCall and Mickey confront Kouros to get Norrell's location and must now save both Vanessa and Tommy.
34	12	"High Performance"	Russ Mayberry	Jack V. Fogarty	January 7, 1987	62313	17.3/29
Construction worker Sally Stevens witnesses hit-man Jordan killing Mr. Tremayne's wife. Lt. Kramer arrives on-scene but there's no body, so she calls The Equalizer. She becomes the next target when Jordan and Tremayne see her watching them. Due to his acrophobia, McCall enlists Mickey's help to review the construction site. Mickey also finds a button from the wife's outfit in the apartment. To find who hired Jordan, McCall asks Dorian who else bought the same outfit from her clothing store. Armed with his identity, McCall sets a trap for him.
35	13	"Beyond Control"	Alan Metzger	Coleman Luck	January 14, 1987	62305	15.4/26
After the death of KGB mole John Ferman who infiltrated the Company, McCall and Mickey meet with Control who says he needs protection from KGB hit-man Paul Coble. He also asks McCall to retrieve top-secret files that Fermen copied from Exden Incorporated. An agent harasses Fermen's niece Elaine Ferris at a café. She calls police after her apartment is tossed by another agent. The detective assumes the two incidents are a coincidence. Her neighbor Mrs. Hammerschmidt hands her a letter from her uncle that was delivered, but it is in code. Assuming she must have the files, Coble goes after Elaine at her bank, but fails. As a distraction to escape, he kills her boss Winston Erdlow. Mickey and Elaine try to crack the coded letter. Coble abducts Control to trade McCall for the files. McCall takes out his own insurance with KGB Station Chief Petrov Durkin, and a stand-off ensues.
36	14	"Carnal Persuasion"	Leon Ichaso	Dennis Manuel	January 21, 1987	62317	15.5/25
Judge Howard Tainey offers to release tugboat skipper Jake Hughes who was convicted of heroin possession, but only if his wife Lisa Hughes will have sex with him. Lisa insists the drugs were planted. She calls McCall who asks Judge Paula G. Walsh about Tainey. She says Tainey has powerful allies. While Jimmy monitors Tainey and Mickey protects Lisa, McCall questions dock dispatcher Zeke. Zeke says Antonio framed Jake who refused to smuggle for him. Tainey is also receiving bribes through Antonio's man Frank. McCall confronts Tainey to save Jake and stop the smugglers.
37	15	"Memories of Manon"	Tony Wharmby	Coleman Luck	February 4, 1987	62316 62318	15.0/25
38	16	"Memories of Manon"	Tony Wharmby	Coleman Luck	February 11, 1987	62316 62318	15.2/25
Part 1 : A joint American/Canadian task force, led by Quebec Police Inspector Phillipe Marcel, is destroying mob operations along the Eastern seaboard with the assistance of an informant code-named Chrysalis. Mob boss Frank Dorgan and his associate Jean Carmack kidnap Phillipe's daughter Yvette, and threatens to kill Phillipe if she doesn't provide the identity of Chrysalis. Yvette turns to her godfather Control, who asks McCall to protect the Marcels. Control reveals that Yvette is the daughter of McCall's beloved former operative, Manon, but doesn't reveal her other secret. To get Yvette away from Mob enforcers Ernie Slackman and Al Geiger, McCall asks Mickey and Billie Bump to carry out an operation of "diversion and psychological warfare." McCall meets with Yvette to tell her he will help, and that he knew her mother. Later when Slackman tries to kill Yvette, McCall and Mickey force him tell who ordered it. Mob boss Tom Calvert who is under indictment puts pressure on Dorgan to take care of Chrysalis. So Dorgan orders Slackman to abduct Yvette again, and in the process Mickey is shot. Part 2 : Dorgan tells Carmack he's going to grab federal agent Blanchard, head of the task force. McCall tells Phillipe he suspects exactly that. McCall must now play Dorgan against Chrysalis to thwart Chrysalis' plans and save the Marcels. But his plan back-fires when Slackman gives Yvette the impression that McCall wants to trade her for money. Yvette escapes McCall's protection and is caught again by Dorgan, so she must give up Chrysalis' identity to save herself. McCall and Phillipe go through with their plan to trap both Dorgan and Carmack. McCall must then come to terms with his own connection to Yvette.
39	17	"Solo"	Alan Metzger	Carleton Eastlake	February 18, 1987	62323	15.8/26
McCall stops a robbery for bartender Stan, attracting the attention of Sarah McGee. She tries tricking McCall into staying with her for protection. Dubious, he leaves just as she is grabbed by Detective Sergeant Gunther Cole. Unaware who he is, McCall shoots Cole, who is saved by body armor. Seeing Cole's badge, they flee. She claims she was framed for killing Cole's partner, and has been checking clubs frequented by her lover, Max to clear her name. Still dubious, McCall asks Jonah to check her story. Unable to find Lt. Kramer, McCall talks instead to Sergeant Worley, but Det. Cole is there too. McCall is too sly to be interrogated, so Cole leaves with a warning. He checks one of the clubs for Max, but the club manager can't or won't help. Jonah verifies Sarah was framed to hide the theft of weapons from her warehouse, Armstech. McCall tracks down the perpetrators.
40	18	"A Place to Stay"	Alan Metzger	Story by : Marc Rubin; Teleplay by : Marc Rubin & Carleton Eastlake & Coleman Luck	February 25, 1987	62321	18.5/30
Thirteen year-old Lynn Rowan runs away to NYC from abusive father Walter Rowan. She's hassled by street people like "Scam" who offers Lynn “A Place to Stay” to make herself $50. Her parents follow, but they're frustrated. NYPD Detective Sergeant Alice Shepard says 50,000 run away annually. Her mother Melanie hires McCall. Lynn meets Judy who says she can find work with photographer Griswald. A street woman berates Judy for exploiting her. McCall asks Shepard where to start; she says "The Deuce...42nd street." The street woman tells him Lynn might be in next month's Puppy Love, like Judy. So he questions a porn shopkeeper. With new photos, Griswald meets Peter Marstand. Suspecting abuse, McCall confronts Walter. Shepard asks them to come to the morgue; McCall checks Judy's belongings for clues to find Lynn. Shepard tries to save yet another underage hooker from the city streets. End-credits PSA: The producers express their appreciation to the National Center for Missing and Exploited Children in Washington, D.C. for their advice and guidance in the development of this episode.
41	19	"Coal Black Soul"	Richard Compton	Scott Shepherd	May 6, 1987	62320	14.6/27
Alex Hayes is a serial killer who cannot stop himself from targeting middle-aged women. He hires The Equalizer to kill him. McCall reports it to Lt. Elmer who wants to know why the killer called him. His next client is Dr. Stephanie Davis, who asks him to save her from a peeping tom. He promptly catches Rags Maloney in the act, and then asks her out to dinner and a little romance. Meanwhile, Hayes bumps into Frances who just missed her bus. The next morning Hayes calls again to warn McCall to stop him, just as he is walking Jill to her stranded car. When McCall gets home he finds a note with an address, just as Hayes arrives at the theater dressing room of Dorothy Hermes. McCall arrives in time to save her, but Haynes escapes and goes after Dr. Davis next.
42	20	"First Light"	Richard Compton	Jack Fogarty	May 13, 1987	62319	15.7/28
Scott McCall and Jenny Morrow talk about dating at a store where she works for Harry Dawson. Two thugs, Woods and Porter, vandalize the store and beat Harry. Scott chases them out. Harry suspects real estate developer Victor Thorpe, who is buying up the neighborhood. Robert is out of town, questioned by Lorraine Watson at a Senate Hearing against Control. Scott becomes "The Equalizer" and confronts Thorpe, who denies involvement. Terrance Booth trashes Harry's home, then hires theater set designer Ernie Frick to recreate "Barracks M." Harry is threatened via his wife's headstone, with a scratched-in death date – 3/29/1987 – tomorrow! Booth abducts Harry, so Scott calls his father. Robert's testimony settles the hearing, saving Control, so he returns to help. Harry wakes up in Barracks M, with Booth calling him a traitor. Booth wants "Vindication" and at "first light" Harry will die. Robert explains the significance of the date on the headstone, but for 1944, WWII. Scott does his own detective work and gets a lead to Frick, from which Robert gets Booth's location. Robert and Control lure the real traitor to Booth.
43	21	"Hand and Glove"	Alan Metzger	Coleman Luck	May 20, 1987	62325	12.7/22
Invalid Deborah Whitten has a nightmare of a hooded figure trying to killer her. When she wakes, the hooded figure is in her room. Her uncle Kenneth Whitten wants to call her psychiatrist, not the police. She claims the figure will kill her, just like her father. Her cousin Ken Jr. only believes "in her" before leaving for a triathlon. Scott visits his father with a new client, Shirley Gossett, who then claims Scott is the father of her unborn baby. Robert sets him straight about sharks (i.e., con-women). Deborah describes another vision to her psychiatrist Dr. Spaulding. Whitten suggests institutionalizing her, so she leaves and meets Scott. Robert takes the case and plants a bug on her wheelchair. Scott finds her will and Whitten Manor building plans while Robert listens to the bug. When she screams he barges in, but Whitten forces him to leave. Kenneth starts the commitment process and Deborah is taken to another house. Robert tells Scott to follow and observe, but don't act. When Scott sees a hooded figure approach the house, he acts, and so must Robert.
44	22	"Re-Entry"	Aaron Lipstadt	Story by : Dennis Manuel; Teleplay by : Scott Shepherd	May 27, 1987	62324	13.4/23
Former Chemerc security specialist Harold Winter is abducted at gunpoint by Garnet. Slate tells him to commit a robbery at Chemerc or else. At a bar, Harold meets Joan Hawkins and his former Chemerc boss George Hershey. Harold asks Joan to take care of his son Chris if anything happens to him. Sensing trouble, Chris calls The Equalizer, but Mickey answers. Chris explains he can't call the cops because his dad had previously sold Chemerc secrets, but George didn't press charges. McCall interrogates Wizard-o-Electro owner Archie about what Harold wanted; a machine to copy an access card stolen by a pickpocket. McCall develops a plan to catch Slate and Garnet in the act, but Garnet kidnaps Chris. Slate calls Joan to tell McCall to call off his plan or Chris dies. McCall and Mickey must now improvise to save both Chris and Harold.

== Cast and characters ==
=== Main ===
- Edward Woodward as Robert McCall
- Keith Szarabajka as Mickey Kostmayer

=== Recurring ===
- Melissa Sue Anderson as Yvette Marcel
- Robert Blumenfeld as Wilhite
- Charles Cioffi as Lt. Kramer
- Cleavant Derricks as Sonny Raines
- Jack Gilpin as Harvey
- Earl Hindman as Lt. Elmer
- Maurice Hines as Billie Bump
- Robert Joy as Jacob Stock
- Robert Lansing as Control
- Lori Loughlin as Jenny Morrow
- Mark Margolis as Jimmy
- Ron O'Neal as Lt. Isadore Smalls
- Austin Pendleton as Jonah
- Chad Redding as Sgt. Alice Shepard
- William Zabka as Scott McCall
- Anthony Zerbe as Phillipe Marcel

=== Notable guest stars ===
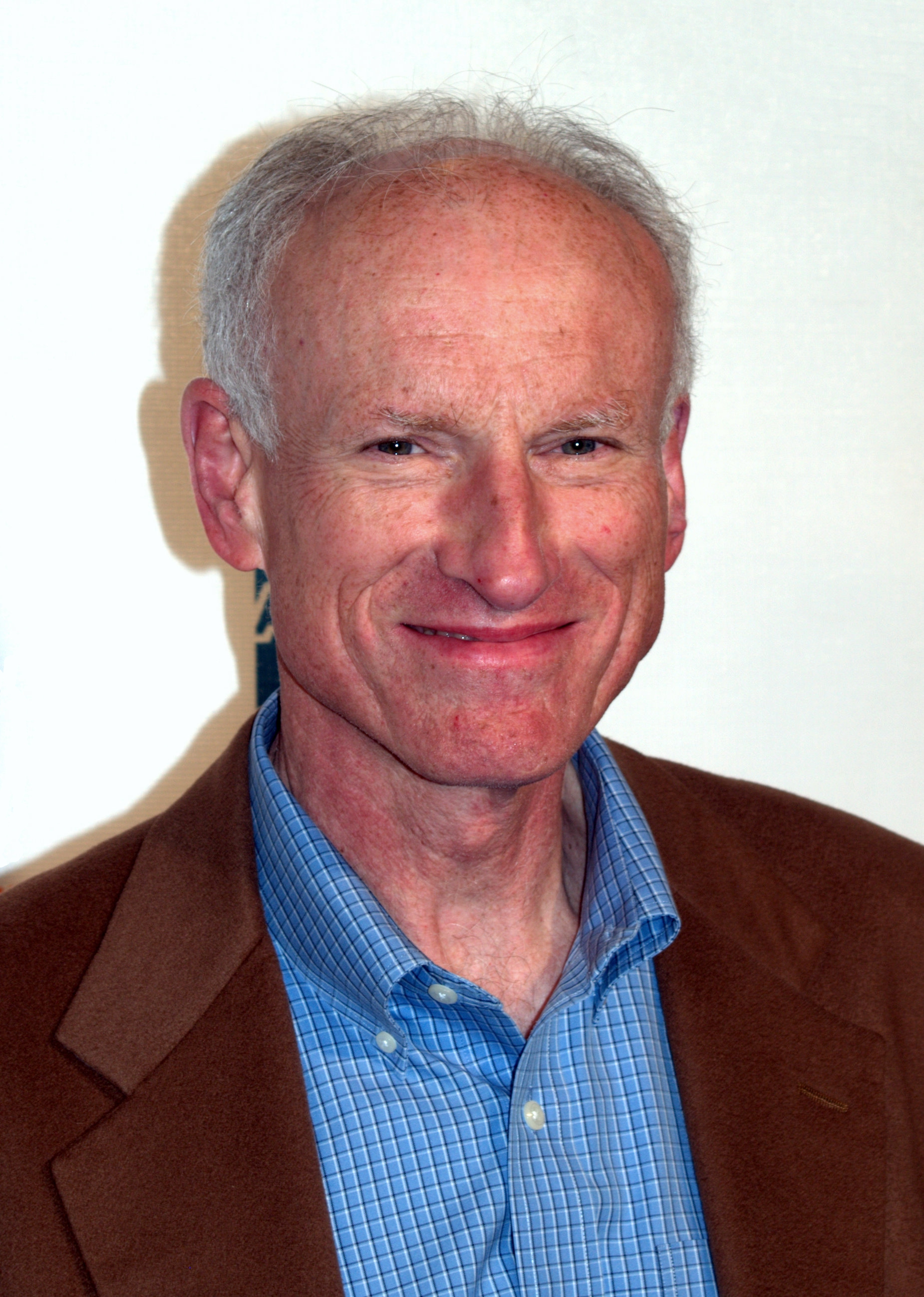
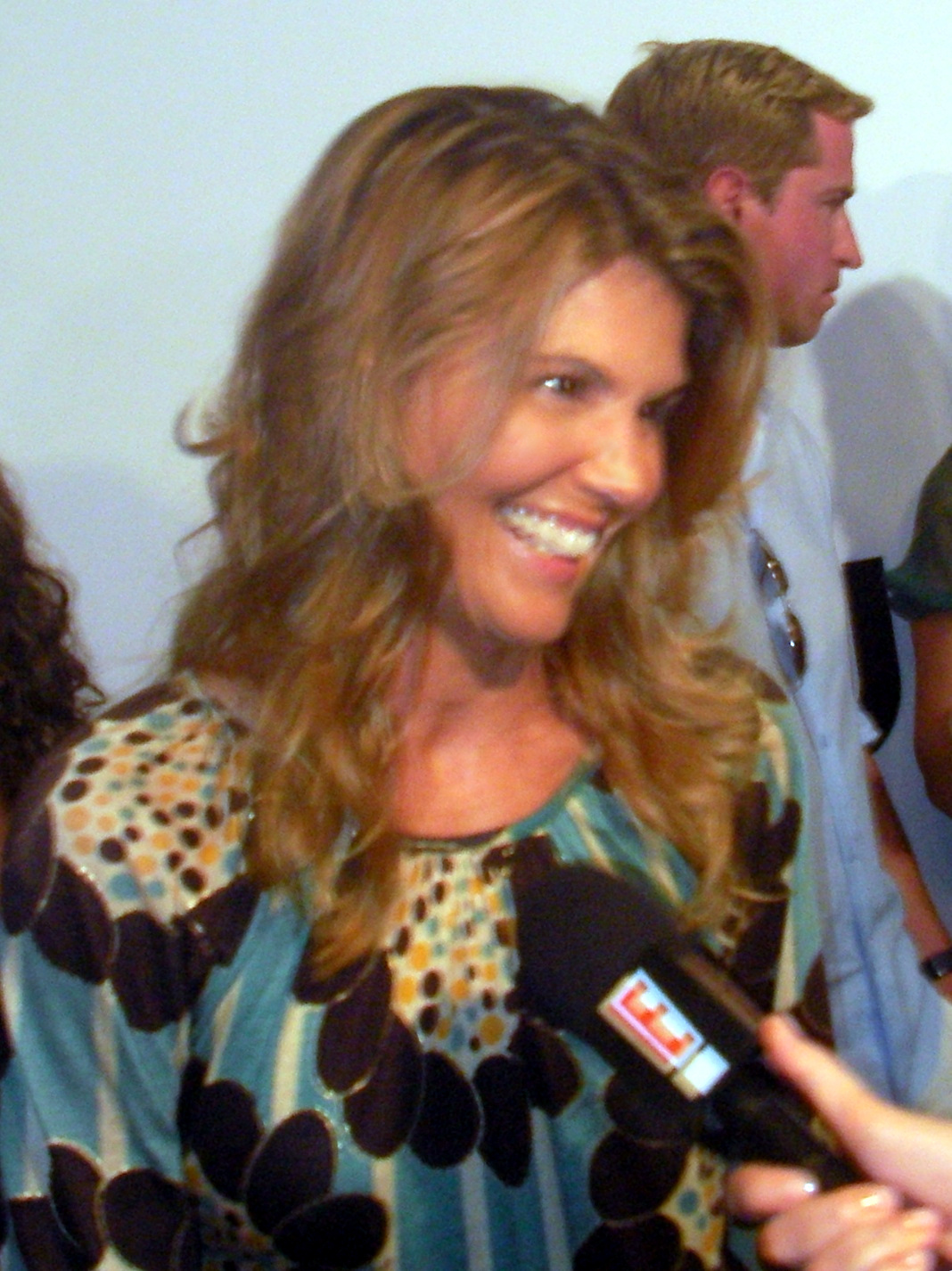
Loughlin & Rebhorn
- Lori Loughlin as Jenny Morrow, who calls The Equalizer, furious because she believes McCall helped the Agency abduct her father Frank.
- Martin Shakar as Frank Morrow, abducted for writing an exposé detailing the atrocities committed by Latin American dictator, General Astiz, for whom McCall designed a coup.
- Jaime Sánchez as Vincente, who works for the Astiz regime.
- James Rebhorn as Eric, an Agency operative who colludes with Vincente.
- Tim de Zarn as Stoller, an Agency operative working with Eric.
- Kelly Lynch as a Bartender in The Paradise club.
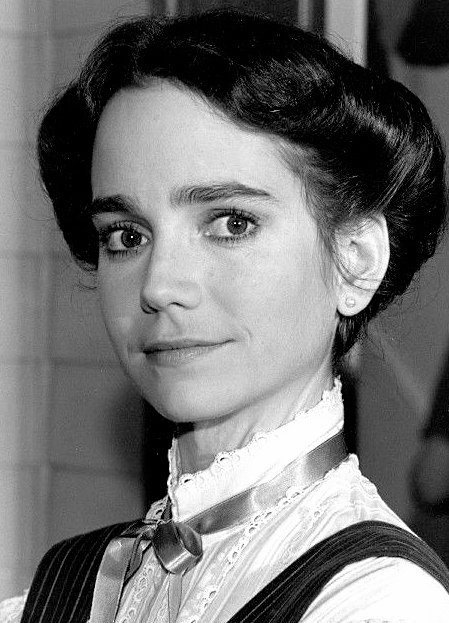
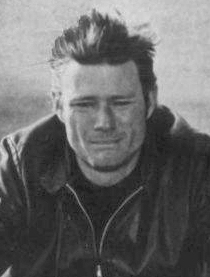
Parks & Harper
- Jessica Harper as Kate Parnell, a music critic and former art critic before being blinded eight years prior in a brutal sexual assault. She hears the voice of the man responsible and hires The Equalizer.
- Michael Parks as Logan, who is suicidal after sixteen years of Company action and a failed mission that killed the teen boy he was protecting. McCall hires Logan to protect Kate.
- Brad Sullivan as Joshua, a former Company computer expert enlisted to create a voice simulation.
- Ashford & Simpson as Nick Ashford and Valerie Simpson, who Kate reviews at a club performing their 1986 #4 R&B hit single "Count Your Blessings" from their Real Love album.
- Thomas A. Carlin as the Doorman Jeremy, whose drunken negligence nearly results in Kate's murder.
- Tanya Berezin as a Secretary, for Julian Coe.
- Alice Drummond as a Kind Woman, who tries to help Kate.
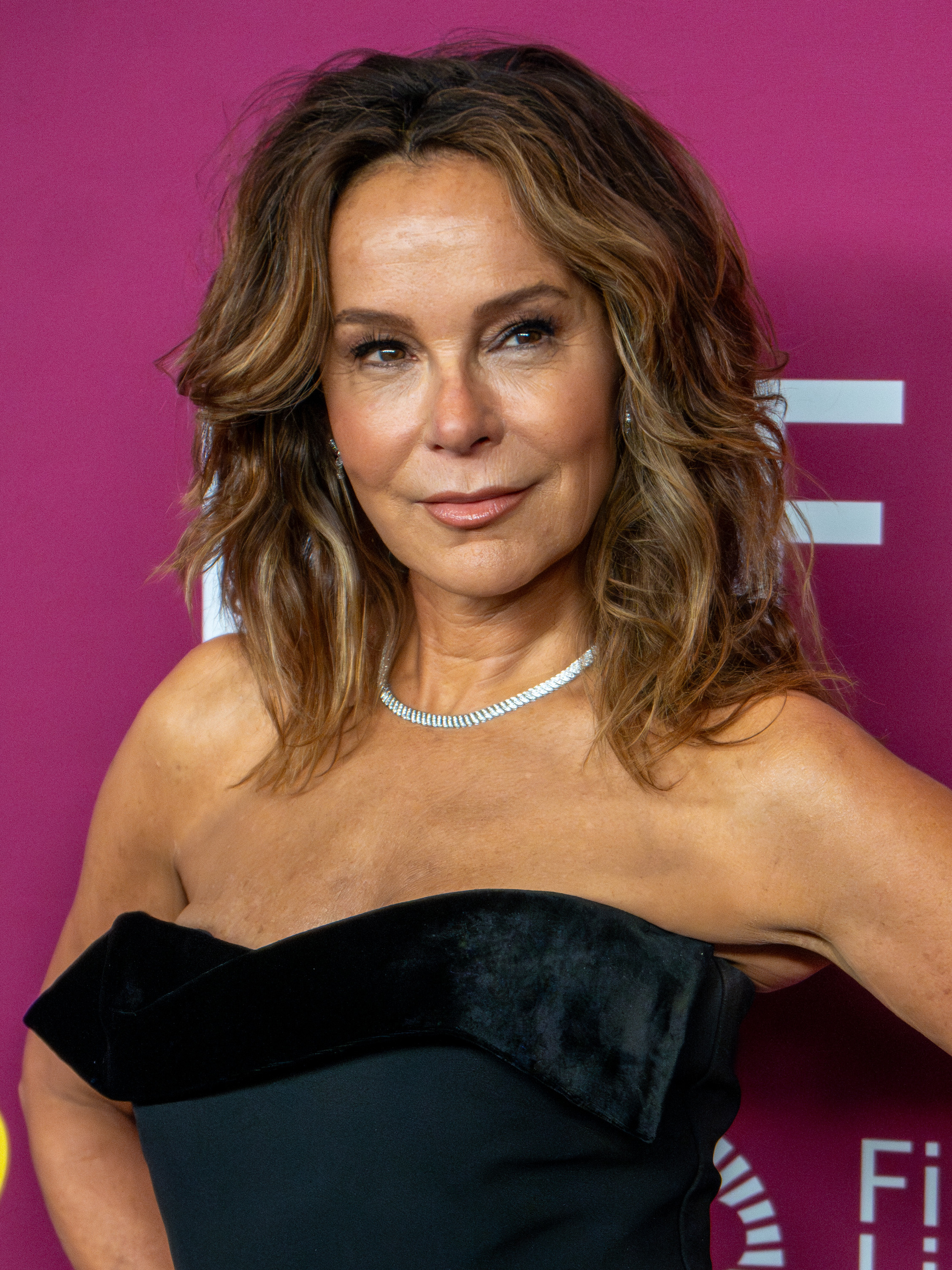
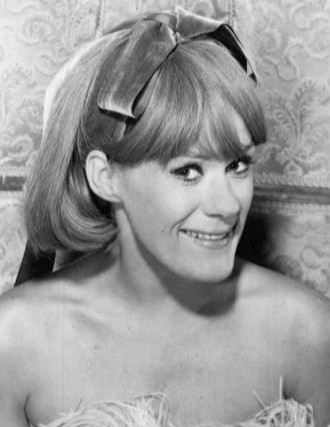
Grimes & Grey
- Tammy Grimes as Julia Jacobs, a widow whose business is vandalized, and is being harassed to pay her husband's debt. She calls The Equalizer for help, then wants to know him on a personal level.
- Jennifer Grey as Valerie Jacobs, Julia's daughter, and NYU film student, targeted for something she captured on video.
- Lewis J. Stadlen as Mr. Cooper, who hires thugs to intimidate Julia.
- Lewis Van Bergen as Zahn, an assassin whose specialty is bomb-making.
- Bruce Altman as Michaels, a thuggish debt collector working for Cooper.
- Zach Grenier as Wirth, a thuggish debt collector working for Cooper.
- Patrick Kilpatrick as Webster, a police officer that questions Valerie after her mother's death.
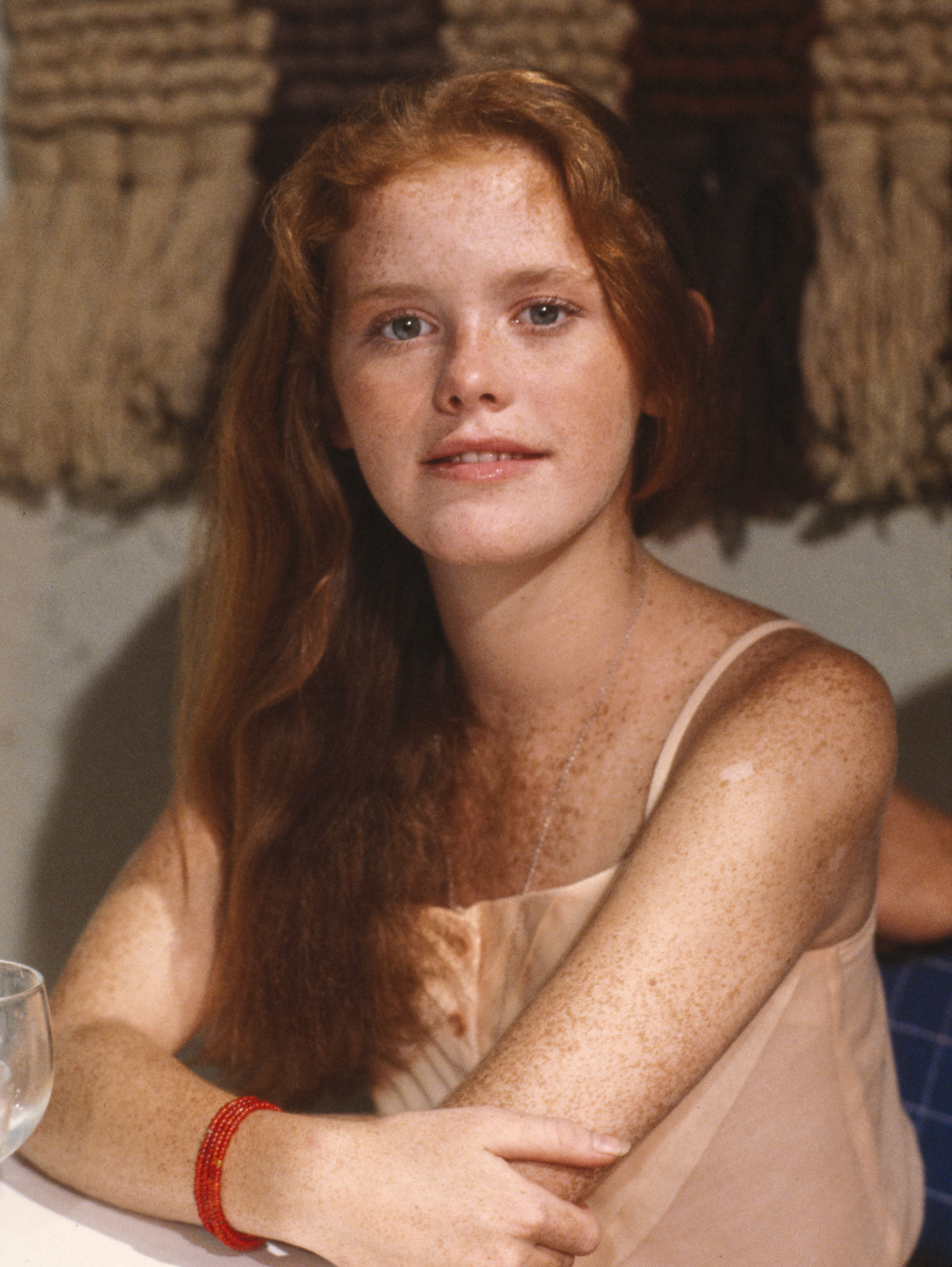
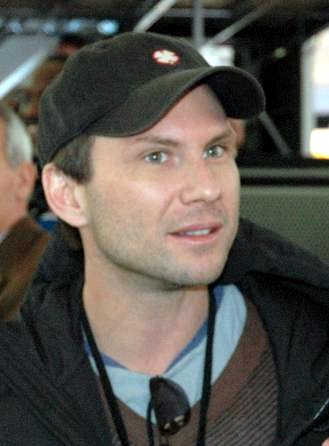
Slater & Vigard
- Christian Slater as Michael Winslow, a bored teen who takes a hearse for a joyride unaware of the crack cocaine in the casket, getting him into big trouble when Steve decides to sell the drugs.
- Olga Bellin as Ruth Winslow, Mike's mother, who calls The Equalizer for help.
- Eddie Jones plays Mr. Winslow, Mike's father who, as a Vietnam veteran, wants to go with McCall to protect his son.
- Roger Robinson as Norton R. Selby, the hearse owner, and a criminal who has his own boss to answer to.
- Kristen Vigard as Rachel, a drug addict who is a friend of Mike and Steve, two whom she provides her "connection" with dire consequences. McCall tries to save her from herself."
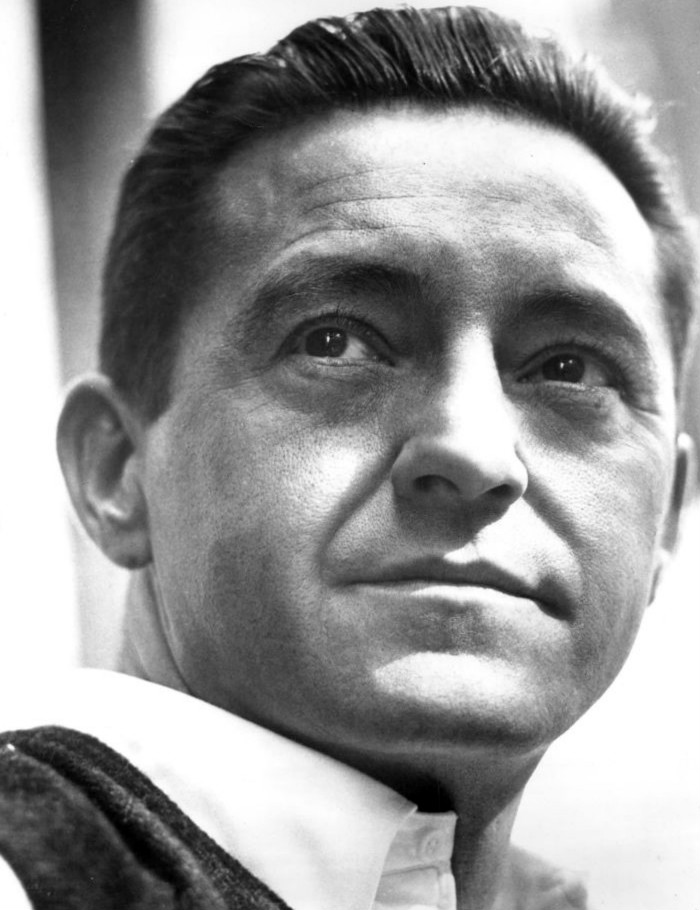
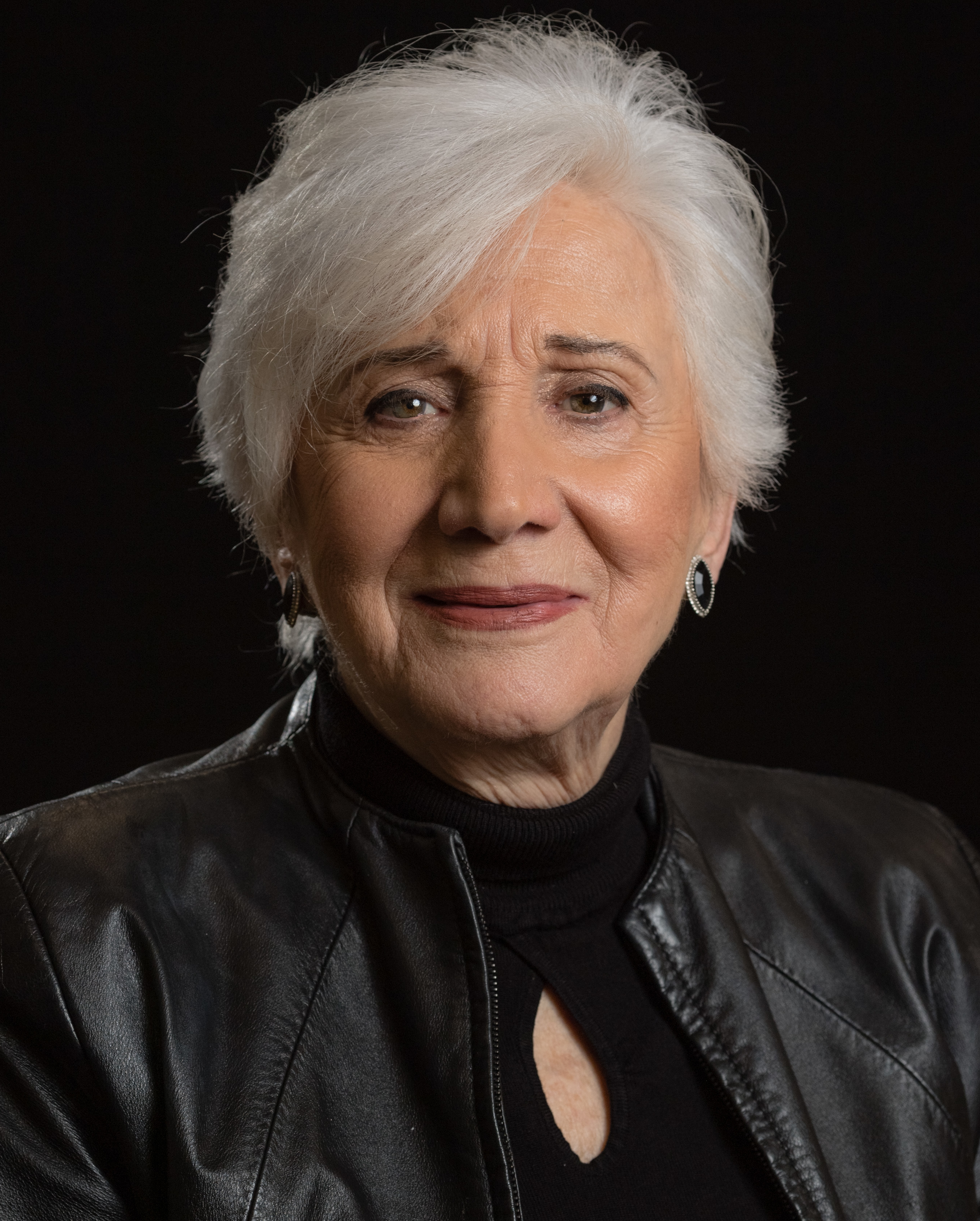
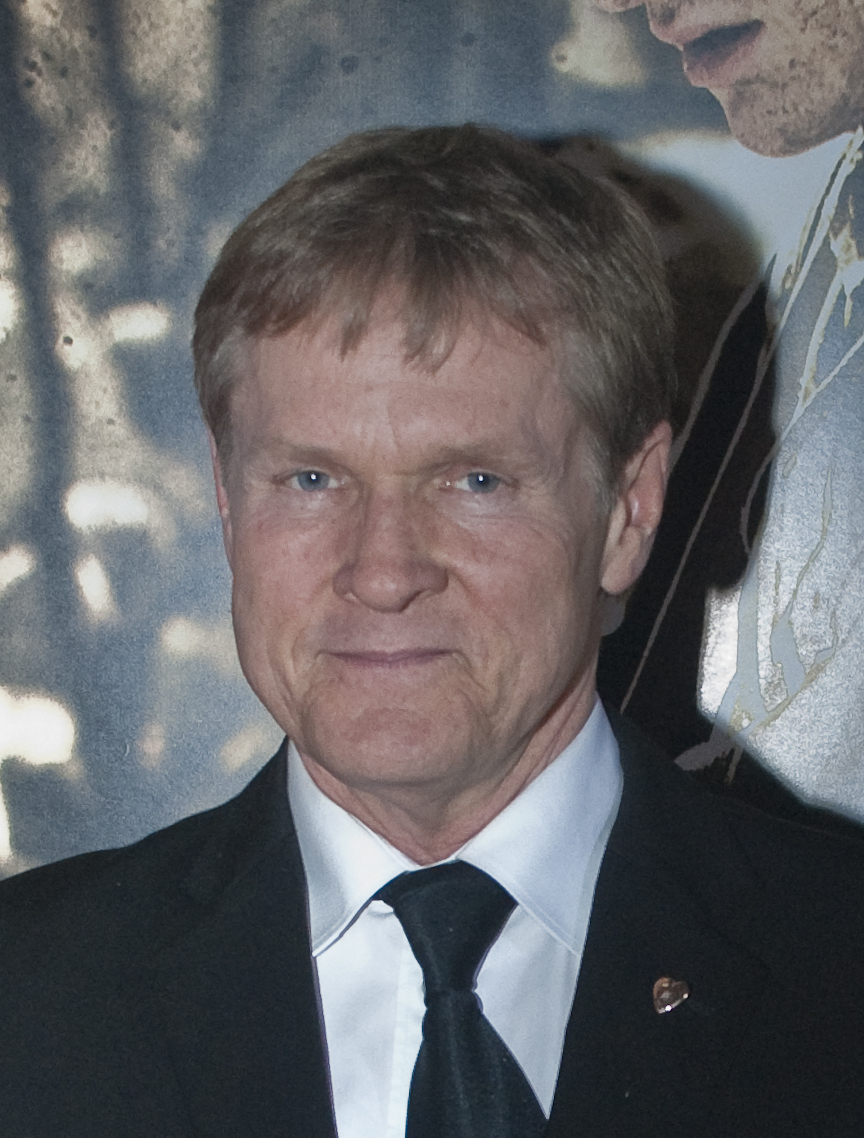
Sadler, Dukakis & Binns
- Lenny Von Dohlen as Dan Turner, a civil servant and part time National Guard Lieutenant who is arrested after trying to help Nancy Polinski, who was stabbed during an attempted rape. Initially rejecting McCall's help, Dan wants to hunt down the murderer himself, until Dillon comes after him.
- Bill Sadler as Rick Dillon, a deranged mercenary who hates the military and officers in particular.
- Caroline Kava as an unnamed Mercenary Recruiter, who owns the Ammo Dump, a club for "cattle call" meetings.
- Olympia Dukakis as Judge Paula G. Walsh, who releases Dan on his own recognizance during arraignment, with $10,000 bail, and certain assurances which she clearly states for anyone who would protest.
- Edward Binns as Father Martin O'Donohugh, who calls his army buddy The Equalizer for Dan on Lorraine's behalf, and provides his mercenary contacts.
- J. J. Johnston as Frank Polinski, Nancy's father who is angered at the Judge's ruling and tries to assault Dan.
- Sam Coppola as Leo Barnes, who witnesses Dan over Nancy's body and calls the police.
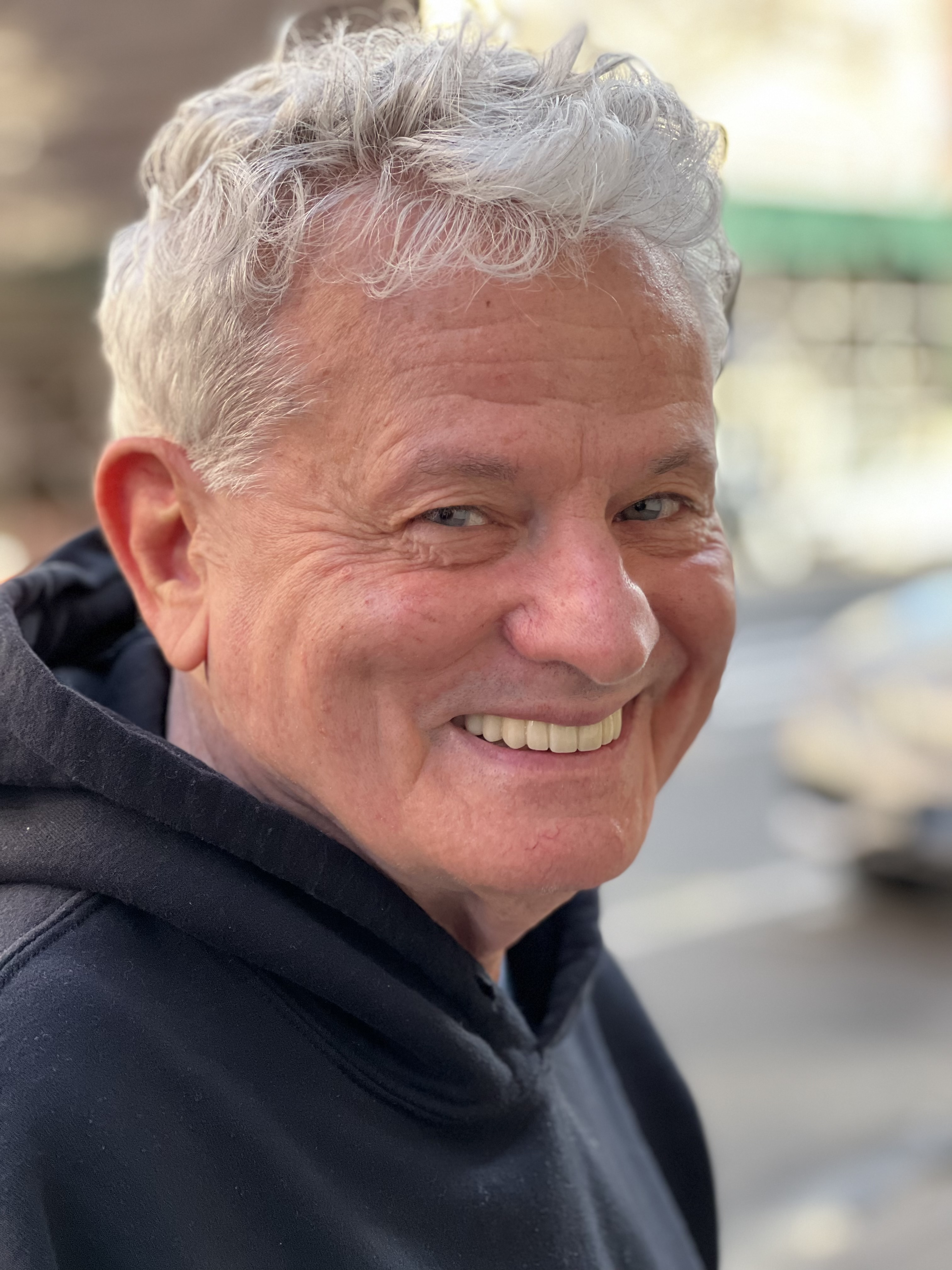
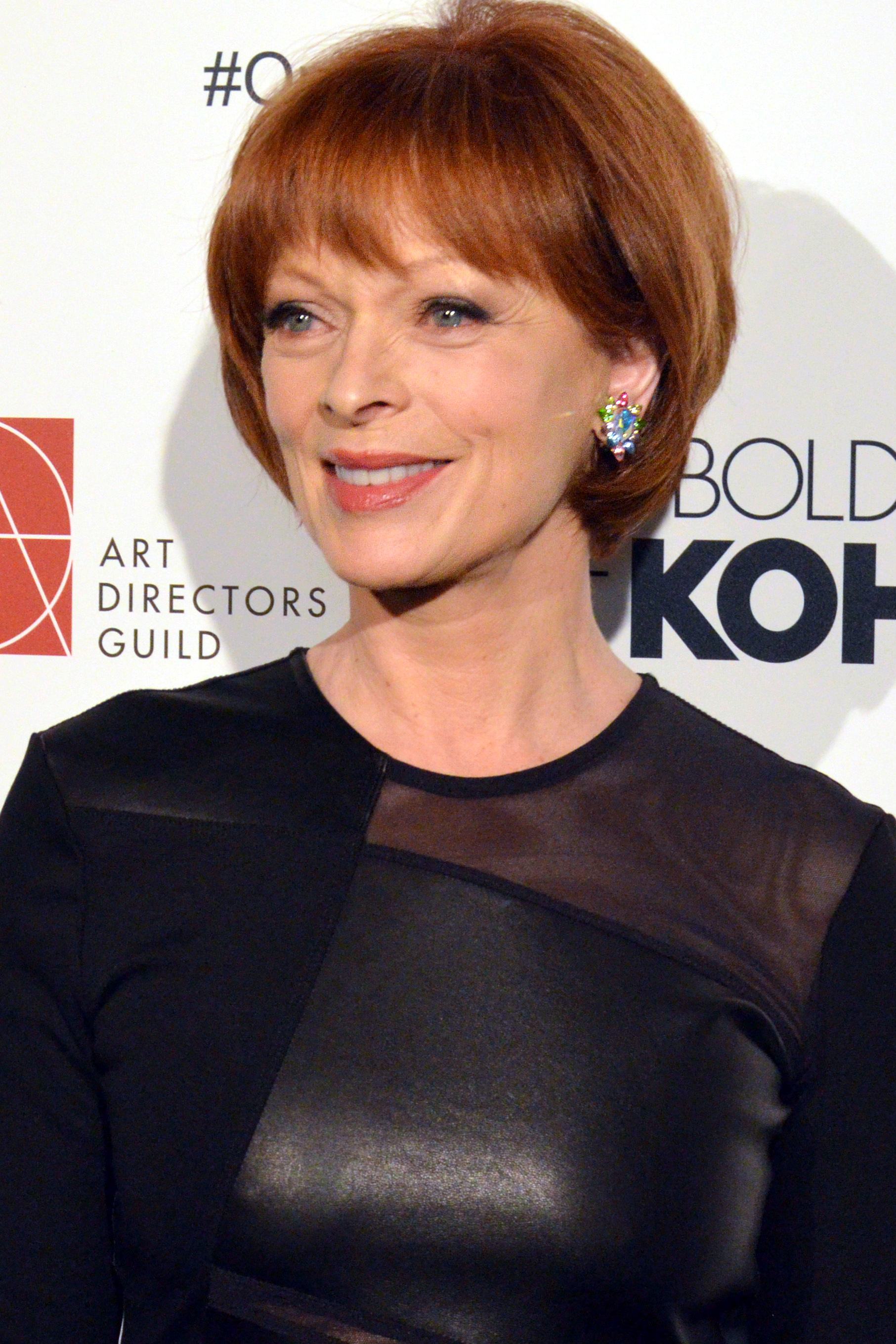
Fisher & Waites
- Frances Fisher as Amanda Kaufman, who survives a brutal gang-rape in the subway. She doesn't want revenge; only for McCall to find her husband before he's hurt or arrested for killing them.
- Thomas G. Waites as Jim Kaufman, Amanda's husband, who feels guilty he did not walk her home that night; feeling responsible, he gets angry, and goes hunting.
- Madeleine Potter as Zena, who arranges counseling for her best friend Amanda, but is also the rapists' next target.
- Matthew Cowles as Rapist #2, one of three who roam as a gang.
- Lisa Banes as Allison, McCall's love interest, who wonders what Robert really does for a living, and listens to his story.
- Tim Guinee as Rick Franklin, who hassles women in the subway.
- Mark Boone Junior as Time, who hassles women in the subway.
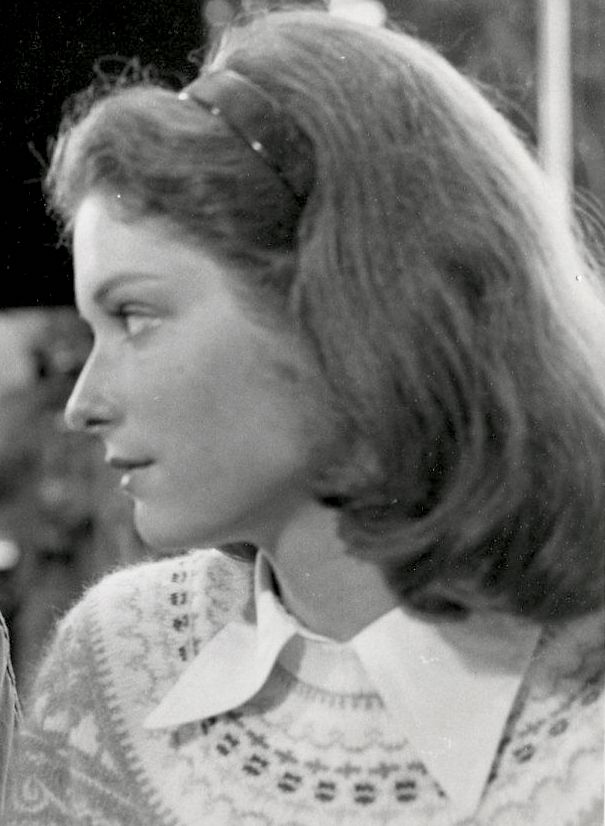
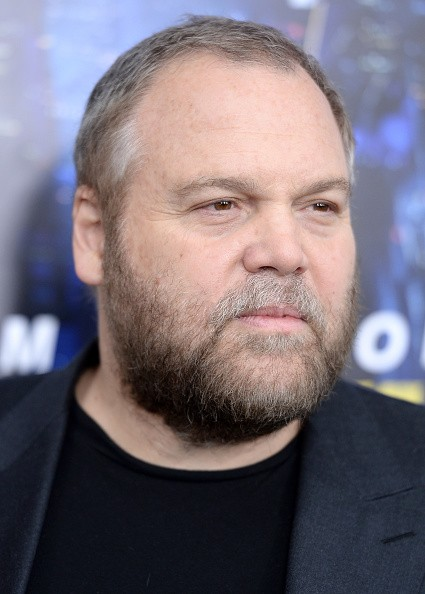
D'Onofrio & Pelikan
- Vincent Phillip D'Onofrio as Thomas Marley Jr., an arsonist and son of incarcerated mobster Thomas Marley Sr., whom he's trying to free by framing McCall to discredit his testimony.
- Lisa Pelikan as Anne Fitzgerald, a waitress at Teddie's, who hires McCall to protect her from being killed as her name has repeatedly appeared in the obituaries.
- Leonardo Cimino as Thomas Marley Sr., who directs his son's activities from jail while awaiting trial for RICO charges, at which time McCall will testify against him.
- William Hickey as Tom Clark, an elderly blind conman who fakes being hit by McCall's Jaguar, as part of Marley Junior's frame-up.
- Sully Boyar as Judge Maurice Sanderling, who denies McCall bail at arraignment.
- Mickey Freeman as a Comedian, at Teddie's comedy club.
- Laura Dean as Terry, a hooker who phoned in the obituaries on Marley Junior's behalf.
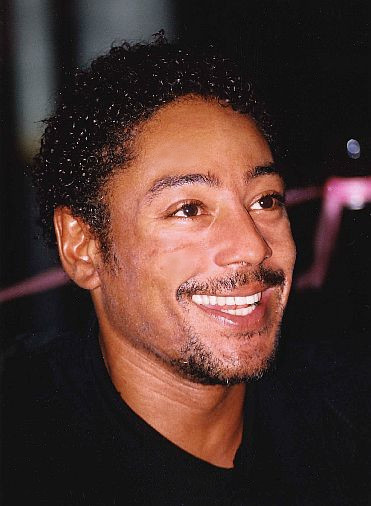
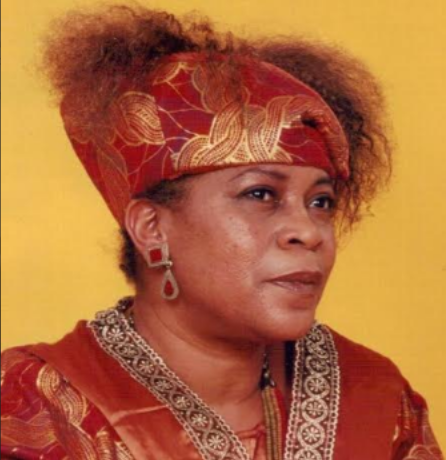
Nelson & Esposito
- Novella Nelson as Miriam Blain, the mother of two boys, Randy and Eugene. She calls McCall when Randy's death is ruled an accident.
- Donald Buka as Ben Carrigan, the eldest in the West Grove Citizen's Patrol (WGCP), who gets beaten when they think he has sold them out.
- Joe Grifasi as Lt. Vocek, who believes the WGCP when they lie about Randy committing a crime.
- Giancarlo Esposito as Jumpin' Jack, a local thug from whom Eugene tries to buy a gun to go after the WGCP.
- Denise Dumont as Maria Rivera, whose son Roberto is kidnapped to fix the outcome of a horse race between Survivor Too and Notaquita.
- Paul Gleason as Greenleaf, who learns of Roberto's kidnapping and tries to cash in as well.
- Roberts Blossom as Oscar Peabody, Notaquita's trainer.
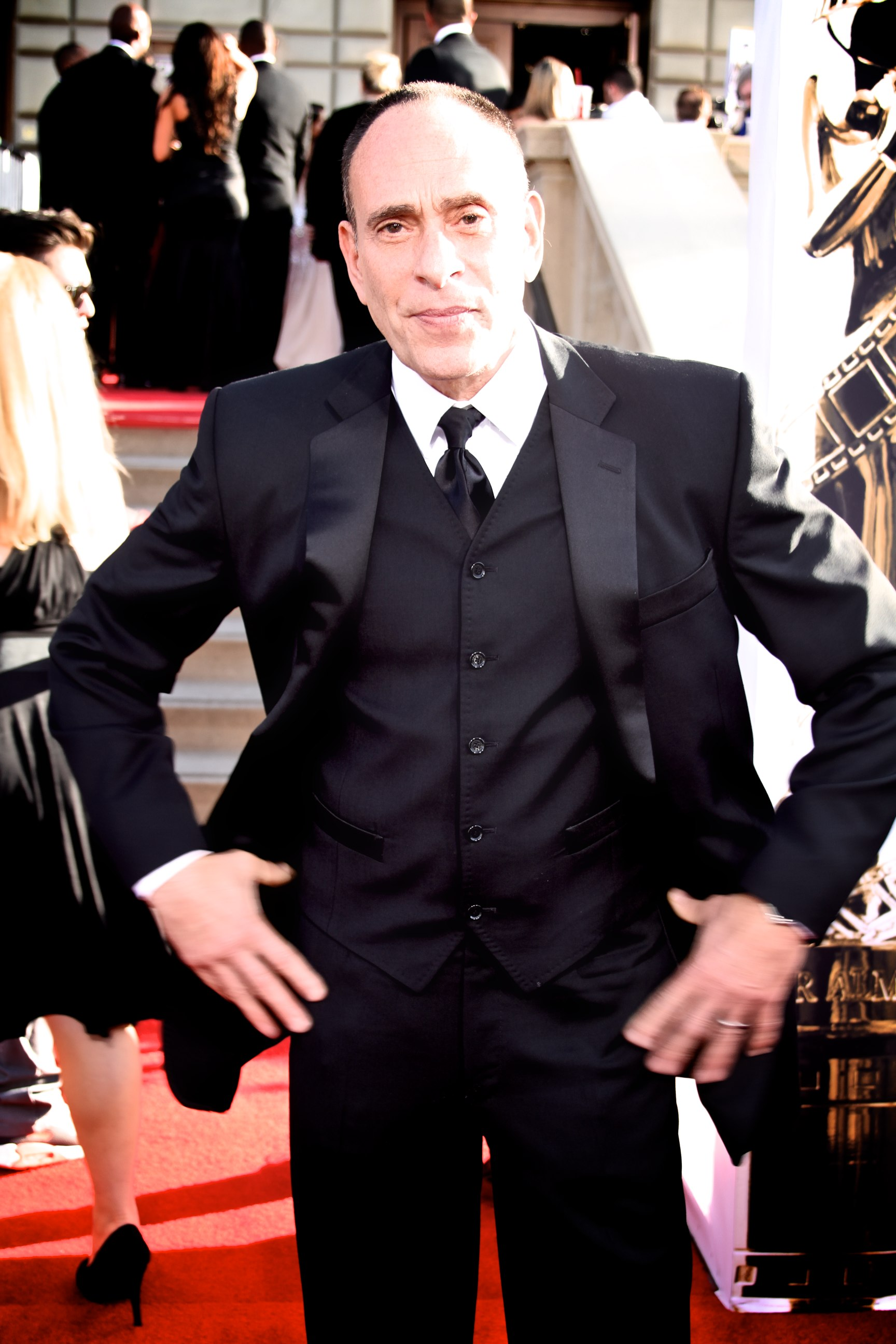
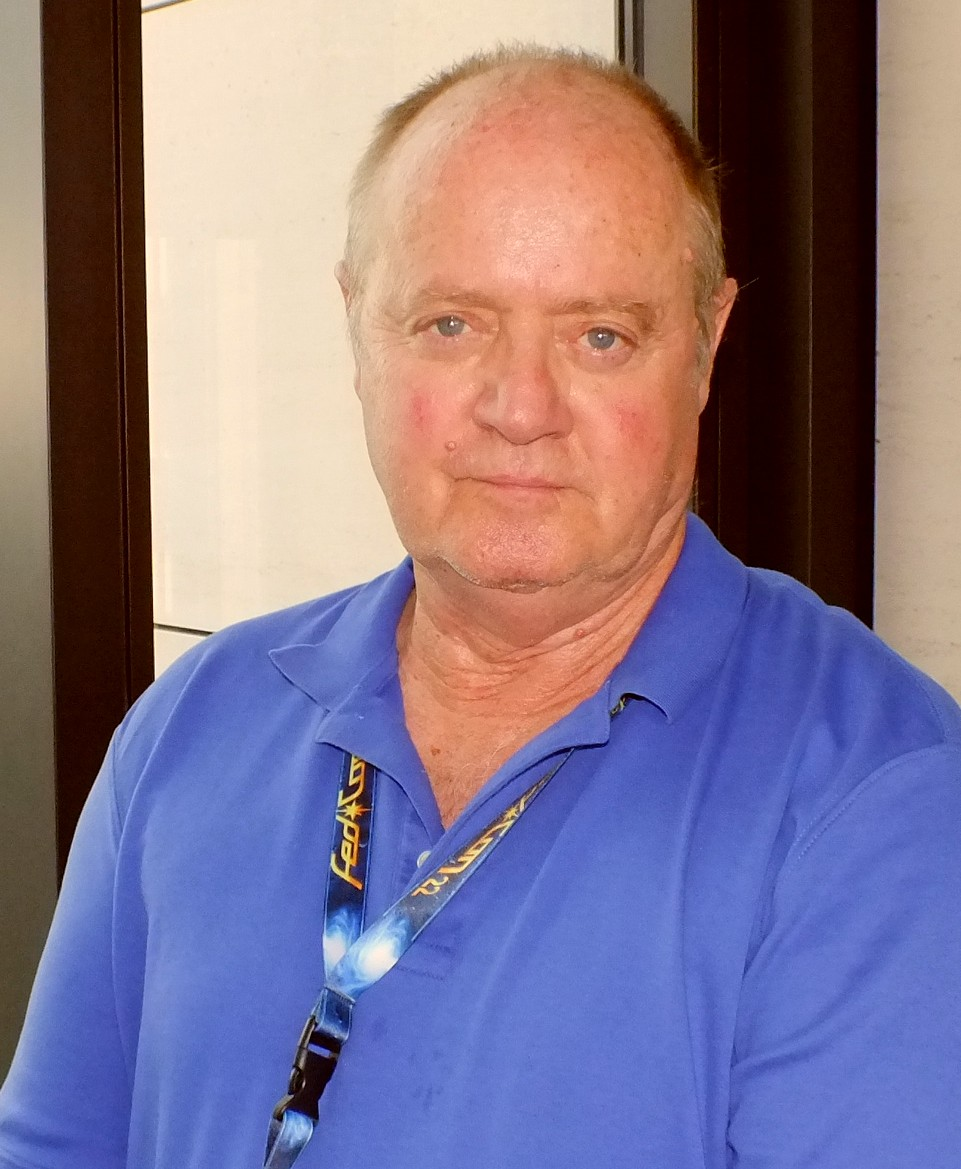
O'Reilly & Serrano
- Robert O'Reilly as Chance, a bookie who wants to secure the outcome of the race by any means.
- Ted Ross as Pike, Chance's associate.
- Warner Wolf in a cameo, announcing horse racing news on television.
- Nestor Serrano as Barry, a "blind" bookie that Raines utilizes.
- Dennis Christopher as Father Nicholas Kostmayer, Mickey Kostmayer's brother, who hears a confession from Stephen, who is murdered in a drive-by shooting.
- Colin Fox as a Bishop, who oversees Father Kostmayer and enlists police protection from Lt. Elmer.
- Donna Fiducia as newscaster Diane Waters
- Lanny Flaherty as Policeman #2
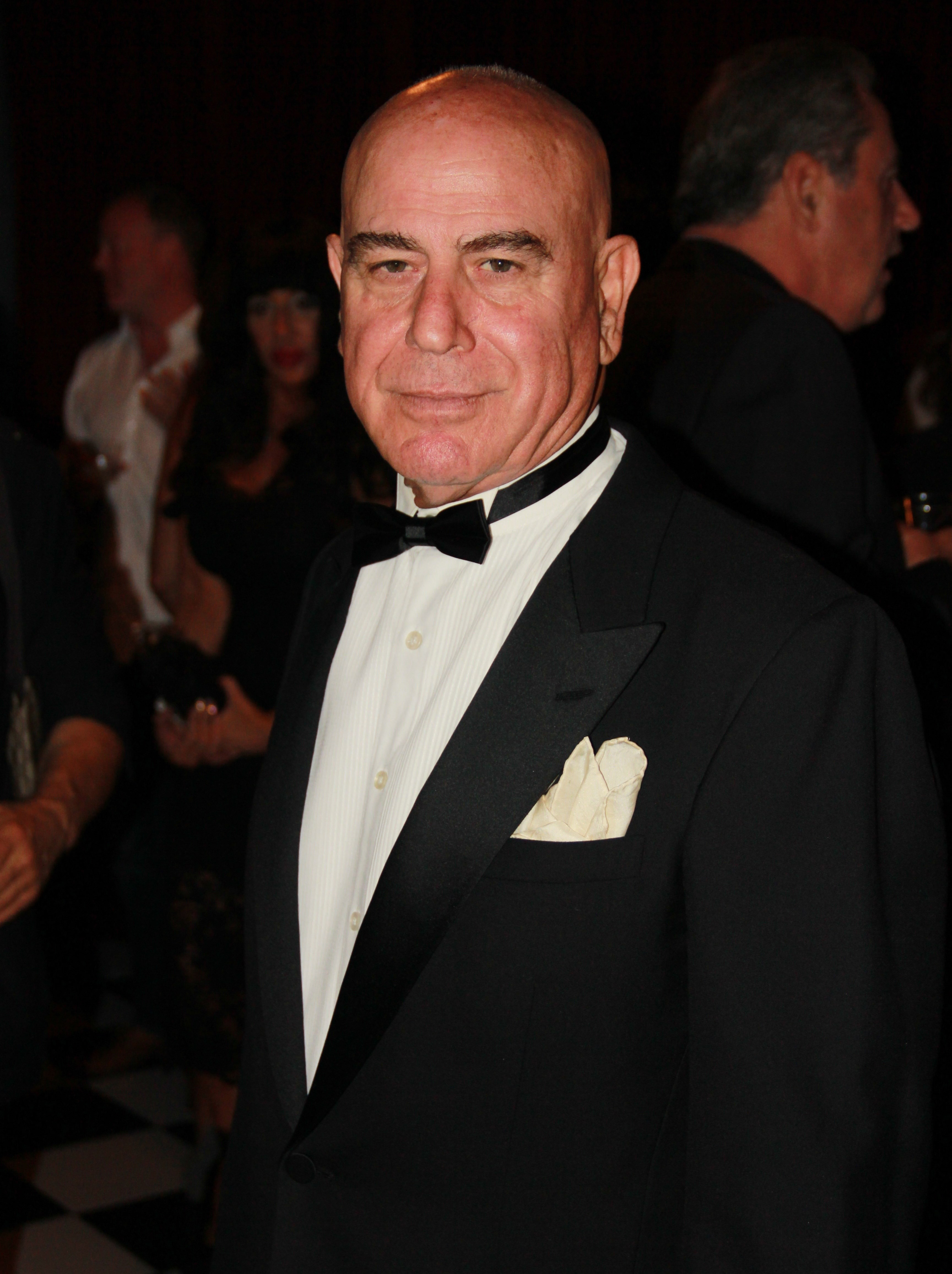
Ipalé
- Michele Dotrice as Vanessa Daniels, a widow whose newborn son Tommy is taken by a woman posing as a nurse.
- David Margulies as Eugene Whitman, the hospital's Chief of Administration, who arranges adoptions on the side.
- Michael Margotta as Norrell, an illegal adoption broker who is trying to secure a large sum from a foreign client.
- Sam Schacht as Frank Carter, an FBI agent, who believes the kidnapper is either a disturbed person or will demand a ransom.
- Jana Schneider as an unnamed Woman, who poses as nurse to kidnap babies for Norrell.
- Aharon Ipalé as Hector Kouros, a client seeking to adopt, no matter the means. As an asset, he has pull with Agency and diplomatic immunity.
- Carol Woods as Second Nurse (surname Franks in dialog), who alerts security.
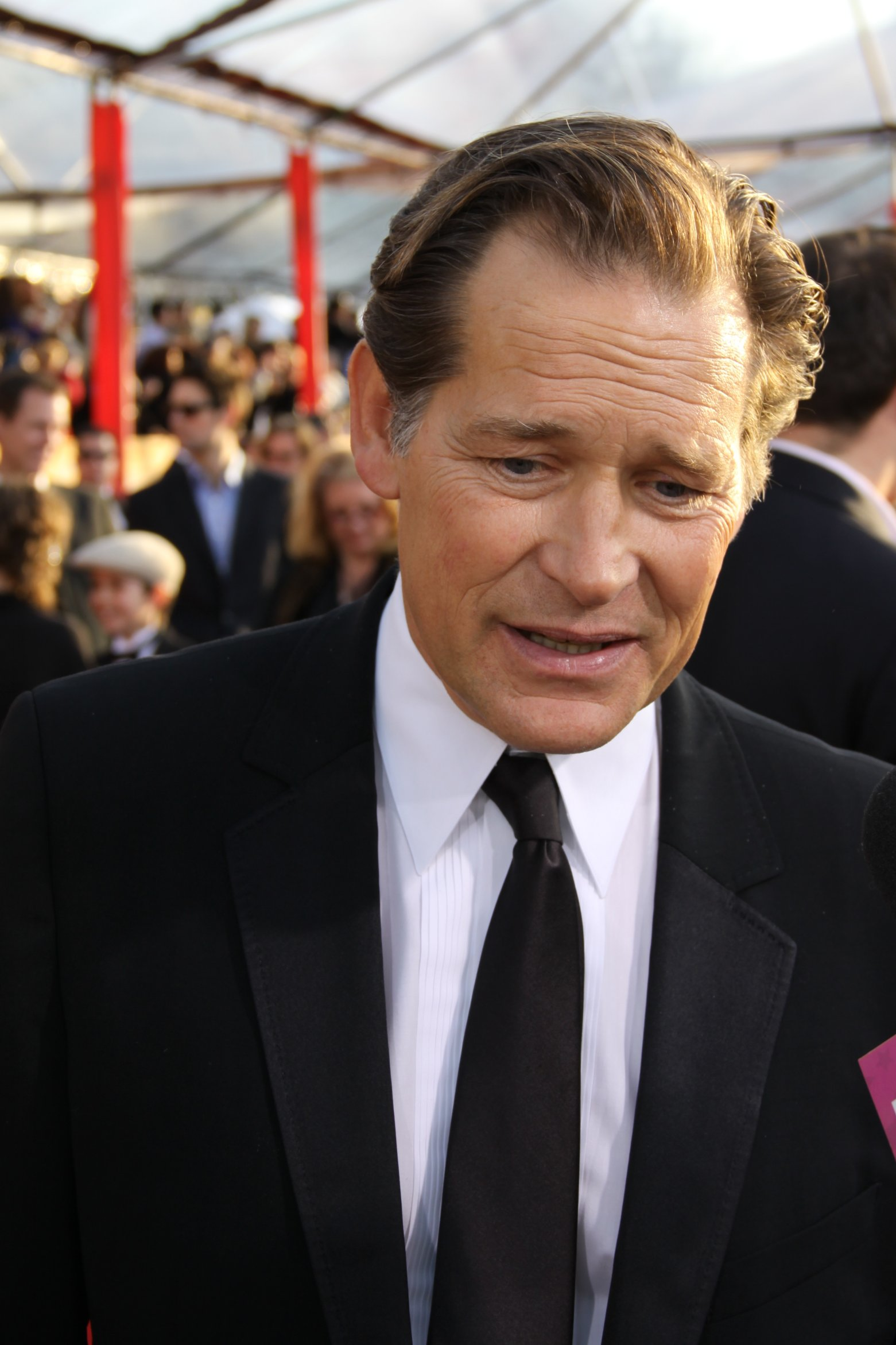
Remar
- James Remar as Tremayne, who hired a hit-man to kill his wife before his divorce costs him millions of dollars.
- Patricia Charbonneau as Sally Stevens, a highrise steel worker who witnesses a woman being murdered across from her construction site, and becomes the next target when Jordan and Tremayne notice her watching them.
- Michael Wincott as Jordan, the hit-man who kills Mr. Tremayne's wife.
- Doris Belack as Dorian, who runs a clothing store and provides McCall a vital clue.
- Liane Curtis as Elaine Ferris, a United Central Bank teller who becomes a hit-man's next target after her KGB uncle John Ferman is killed for top-secret files copied from Control.
- Brian Bedford as Paul Coble, a KGB hit-man from whom Control needs protection.
- Dan Ziskie as an unnamed Detective, sent to investigate the break-in at Elaine's apartment.
- Paula Trueman as Mrs. Hammerschmidt, Elaine's neighbor who has a coded letter from her uncle.
- Josh Mostel as Winston Erdlow, Elaine's boss at the bank.
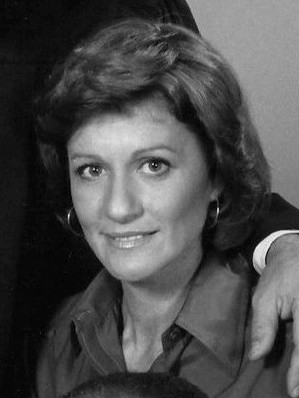
Harris
- John Cullum as Judge Howard Tainey, who extorts Lisa Hughes for sex in exchange for a reduced sentence or vacated conviction for her husband Jake.
- John Laughlin as Jake Hughes, Lisa's husband and tugboat skipper who was framed for heroin possession.
- Raymond Serra as Antonio, who had Jake framed for refusing to smuggle for him.
- Cynthia Harris as Judge Paula G. Walsh, appointed at the same time as Judge Tainey, but he has advanced far beyond her because someone is pulling strings.
- Louis Zorich as Zeke, a dock dispatcher who was recently fired.
- Rocco Sisto as Frank, who works for Antonio.
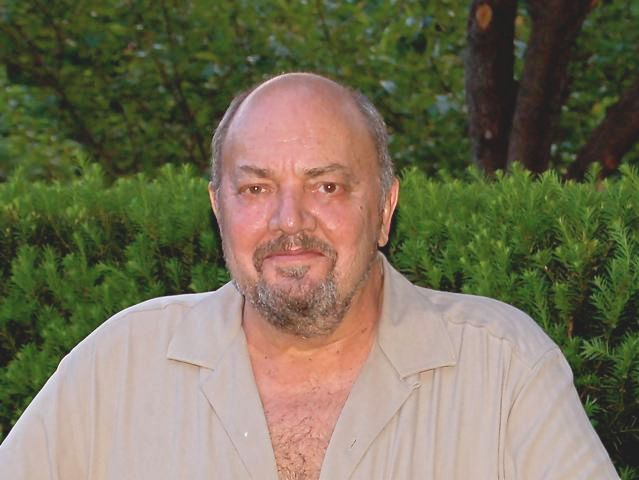
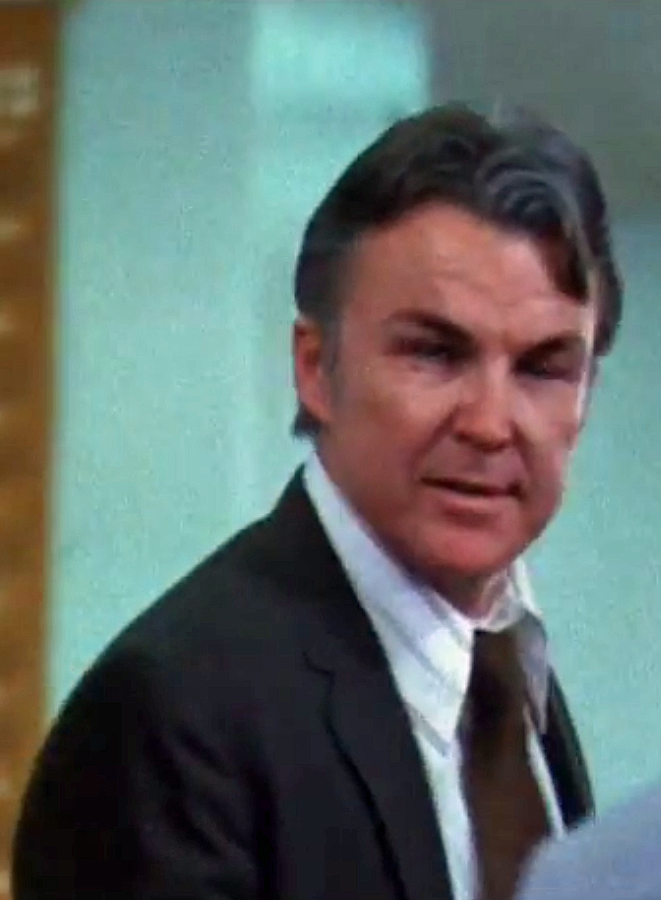
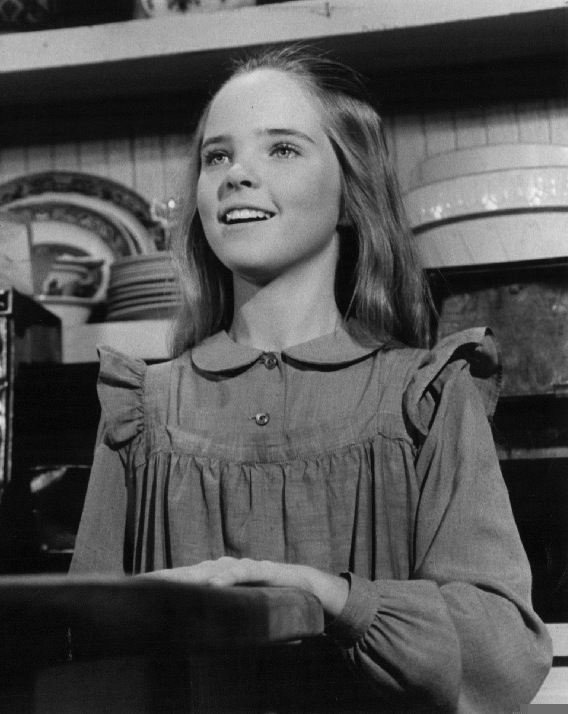
Anderson, Zerbe & DiCenzo
- Melissa Sue Anderson as Yvette Marcel, Phillipe and Manon's daughter, and Control's goddaughter, who is kidnapped and threatened to discover the identity of Chrysalis or her father will be killed. She asks her godfather for help.
- Anthony Zerbe as Phillipe Marcel, a Police Inspector from Quebec who has been aiding a joint American/Canadian task force to dismantle organized crime along the Eastern seaboard, using a confidential informant code-named Chrysalis.
- George DiCenzo as Frank Dorgan, a mob boss who has Yvette kidnapped by his enforcer, Ernie Slackman, and has his is own capo associates to answer to, thus the pressure to uncover and silence Chrysalis.
- Jon Polito as Carmack, Dorgan's underling and associate of twenty-years, who holds a secret he doesn't want Dorgan to discover.
- Frank Adonis as Limo Driver, for Dorgan, and his "left" hand man in the confrontation at the end of Part 2.
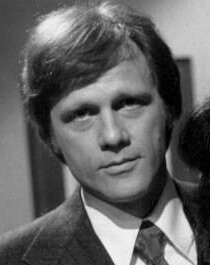
Russom
- Lindsay Crouse as Sarah McGee, an inventory control specialist at munitions manufacturer Armstech, who's fleeing a Pennsylvania warrant, framed for killing Sgt. Cole's partner. She becomes romantically involved with McCall.
- Kevin Spacey as Detective Sergeant Gunther Cole, a corrupt cop who is working with Max, Sarah's former lover who used her to gain access to Armstech.
- Leon Russom as NYPD Sergeant Worley, who interrogates McCall with Sgt. Cole present.
- Bruce Hubbard as Manager, at a club where McCall and Sarah search for Max.
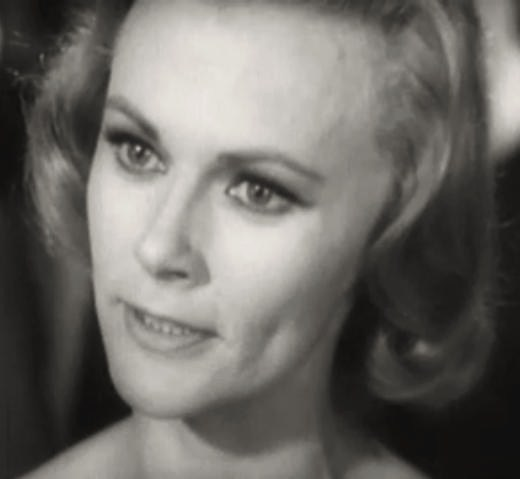
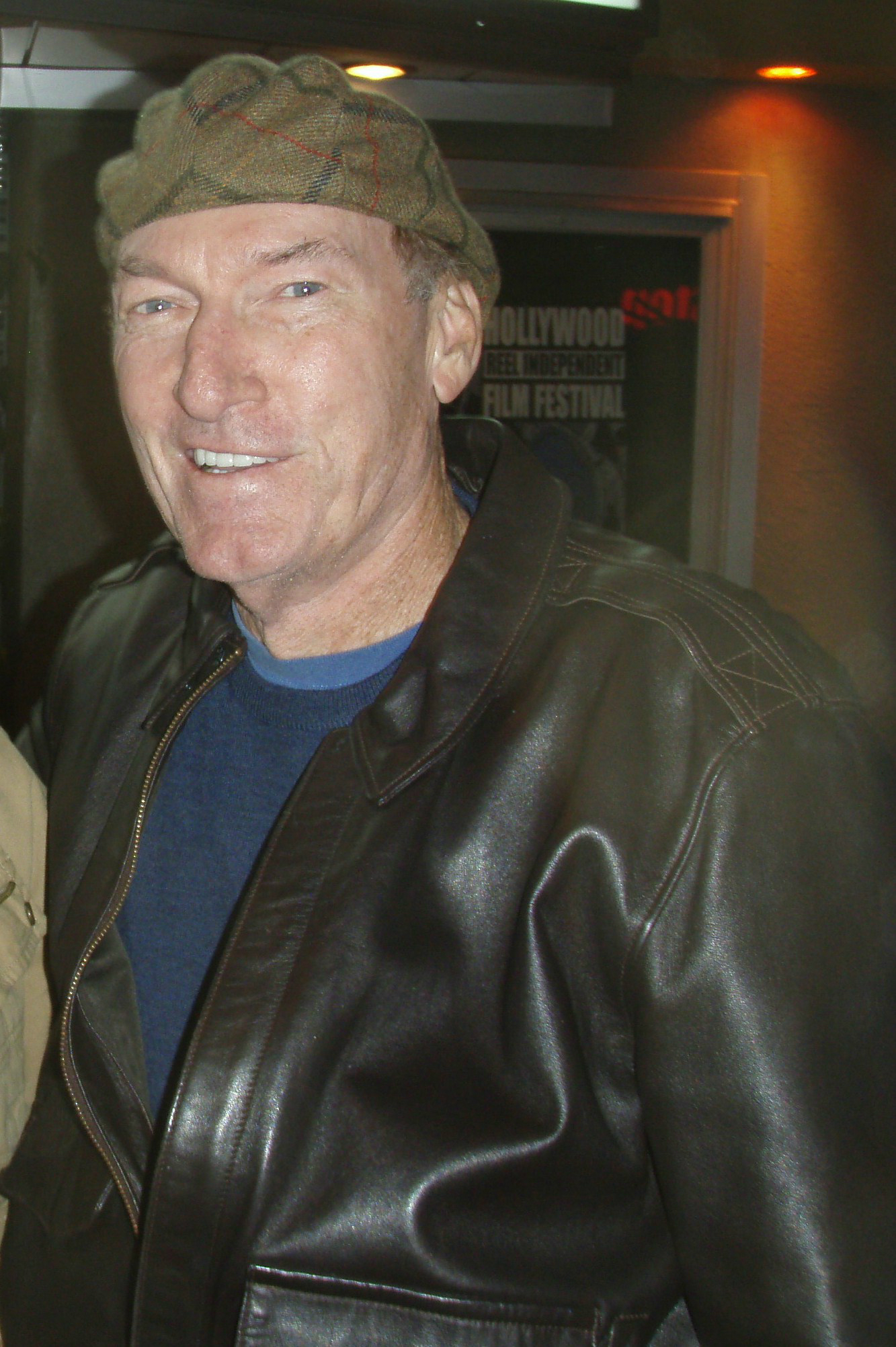
Lauter & Leslie
- Trey Wilson as Peter Marstand, a buyer of underage photos. He tells Griswald to bring Lynn Rowan (Alyson Kirk) to the launch party for his new architectural magazine.
- Kario Salem as Griswald, who runs an "art" studio, and supplies photos and girls to clients.
- Bethel Leslie as Woman on Street, who knows Judy's game of exploitation, berates her for it, and tips McCall in the right direction, for a $20 and a promise of reward.
- Ed Lauter as Walter Rowan, Lynne's father and abusive husband, who swore he'd never be like his own abusive father.
- Anne Carlisle as an Advertiser at Marstand's party.
- Tim Cappello as a Shopkeeper of adult material, who receives underage magazines on the down-low every month, cash only.
- Leslie Lyles as Woman
- Rick Aviles as Scam who promises Lynn "A Place to Stay" and a way to make $50.
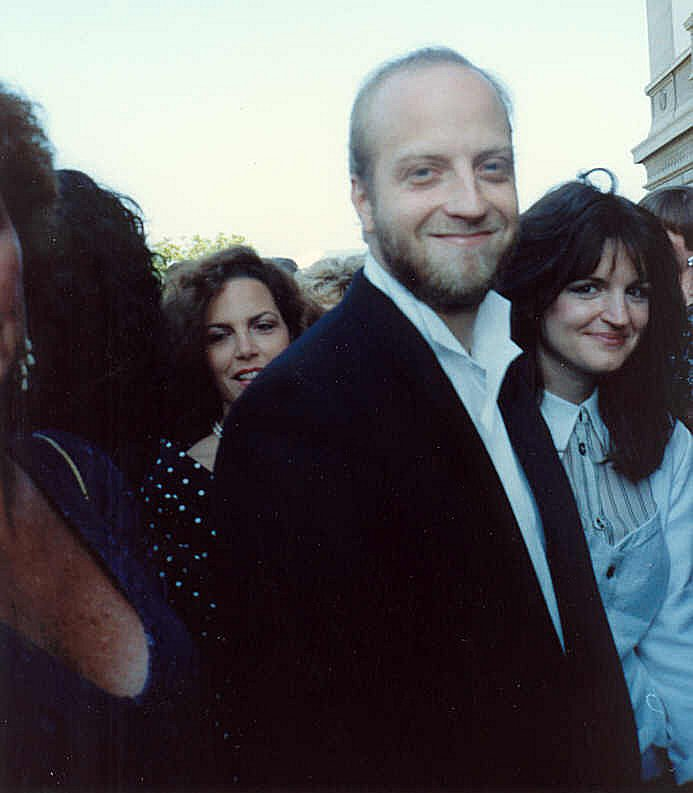
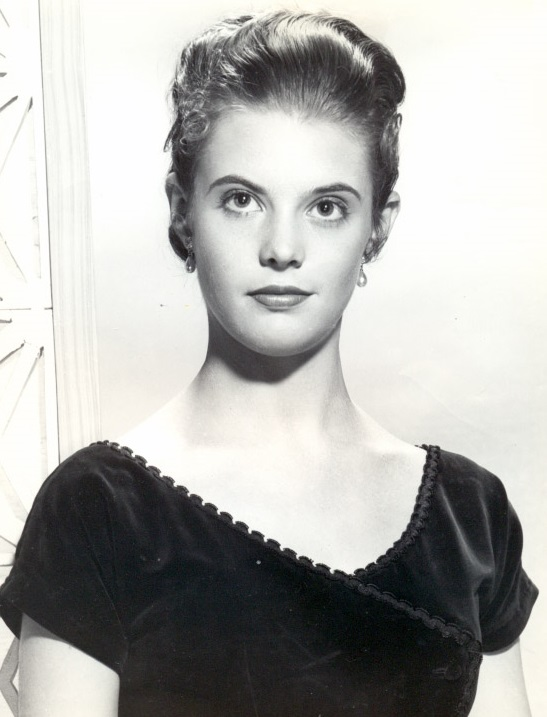
Smith & Elliott
- Patricia Kalember as Dr. Stephanie Davis, a psychiatrist who hires McCall to stop a peeping Tom. They begin a romance, and she profiles a serial killer against whom he protects her.
- Mitchell Lichtenstein as Alex Hayes, a serial killer who targets middle-aged women, and hires The Equalizer to kill him as he cannot control himself.
- Lois Smith as Dorothy Hermes, a theatre actress who plays a mother to help McCall against serial killer Hayes. McCall must save her from him, and she will have one more very important role to play.
- Chris Elliott as Rags Maloney, a peeping Tom who, when caught in the act, says he's a cable guy setting up a dish.
- Gale Garnett as Frances, a legal secretary who becomes Hayes' next victim when she misses her bus.
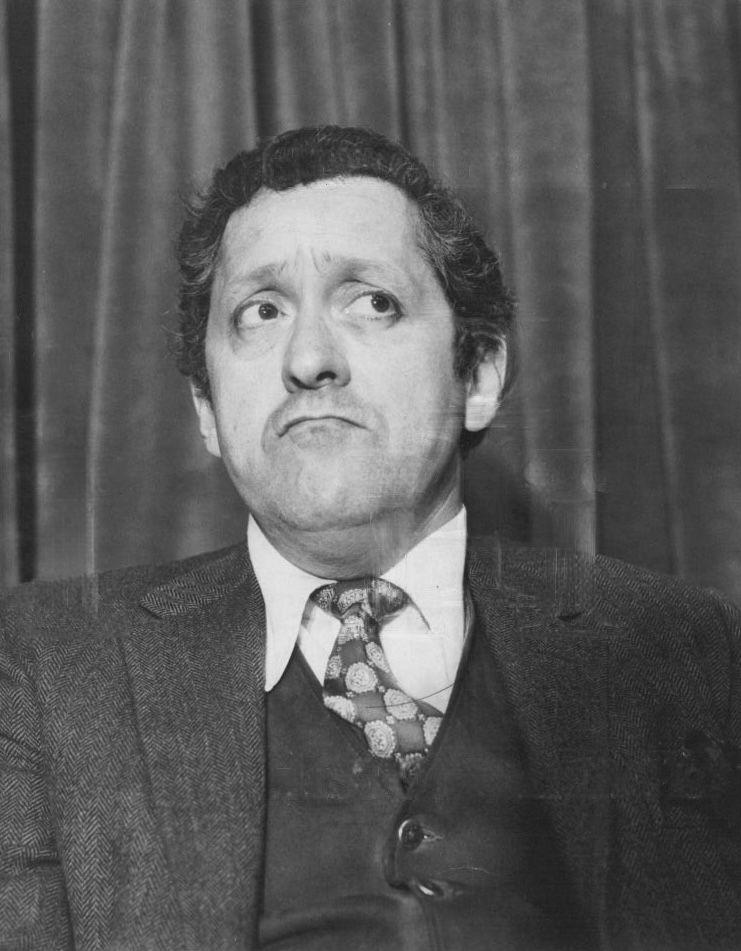
Nussbaum
- Robert X. Modica as Terrance Booth who has a WWII grudge against Harry Dawson, whom he terrorizes and finally abducts, intending to execute as a traitor.
- Mike Nussbaum as Harry Dawson, who runs the store where Jenny Morrow works. He is beaten by thugs and his store vandalized; he suspects Victor Thorpe.
- Kaiulani Lee as Lorraine Watson, who questions Control at a Senate Hearing where McCall is testifying
- Quentin Crisp as Ernie Frick, a theater set designer who is hired to recreate "Barracks M," a stalag where Booth and Dawson were held during WWII.
- Marco St. John as Victor Thorpe, a real estate developer who is buying up the neighborhood.
- Ira Lewis as Porter, a thug who beats Harry and vandalizes his store.
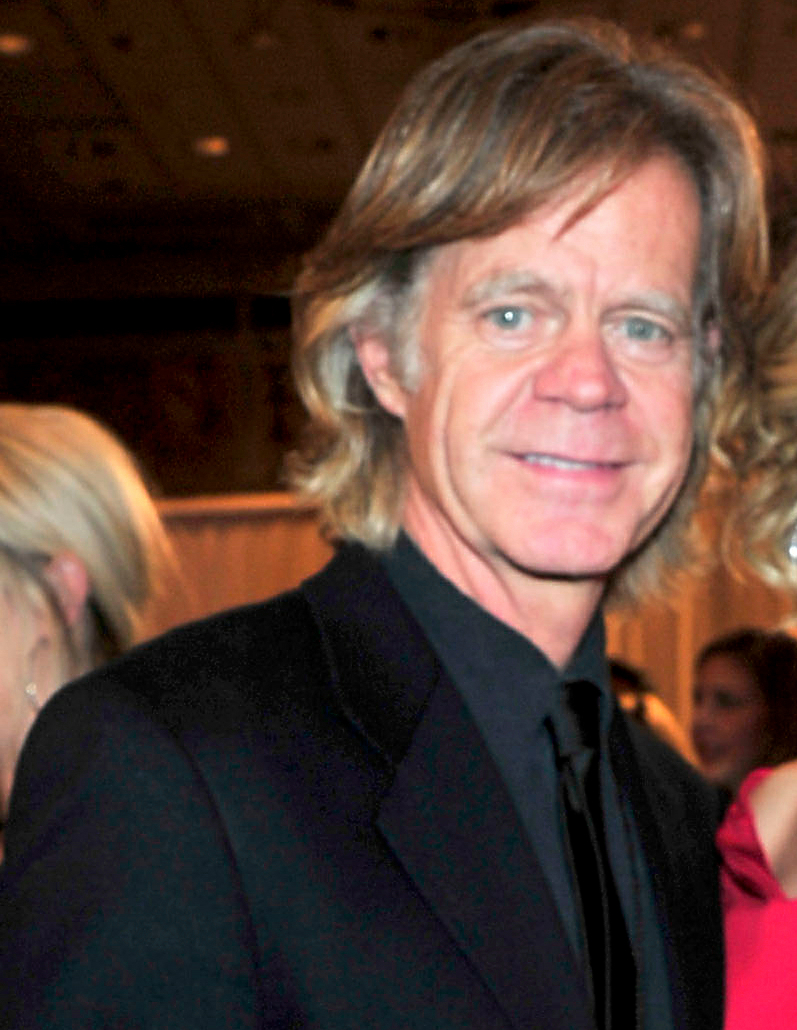
Macy
- Barbara Garrick as Deborah Whitten, an invalid who is being terrorized by nightmares of a hooded figure trying to killer her even when she wakes.
- Mark Soper as Ken Whitten Jr., Deborah's cousin.
- Charles Keating as Kenneth Whitten, Deborah's uncle who keeps police away by sequestering her in another house, calling her psychiatrist, and suggests institutionalization.
- William H. Macy as Dr. Spaulding, Deborah's psychiatrist, to whom she describes her visions.
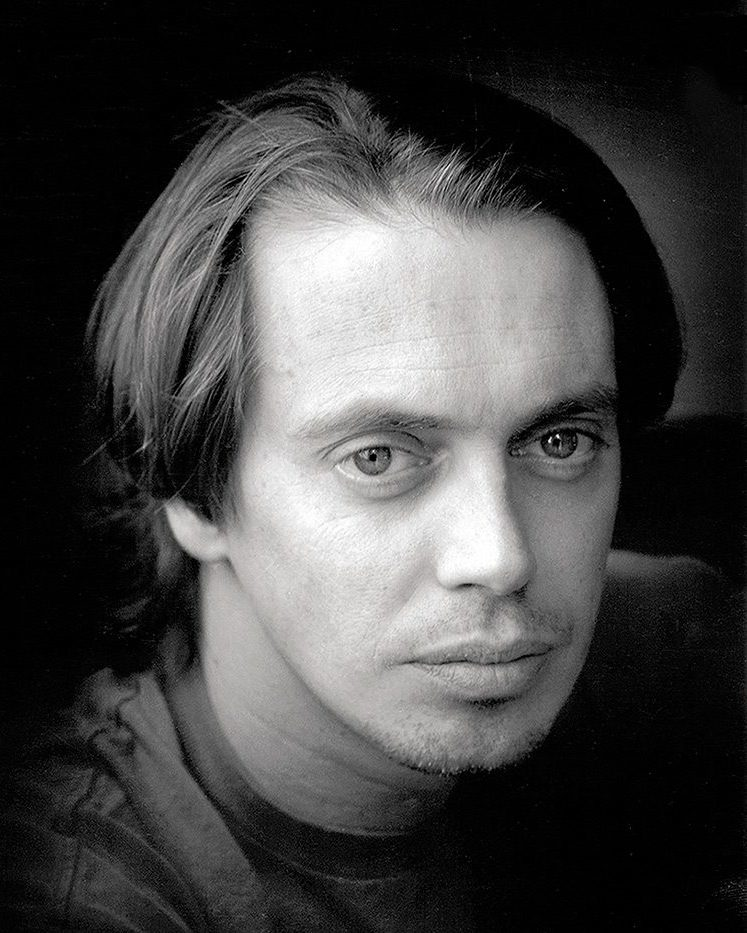
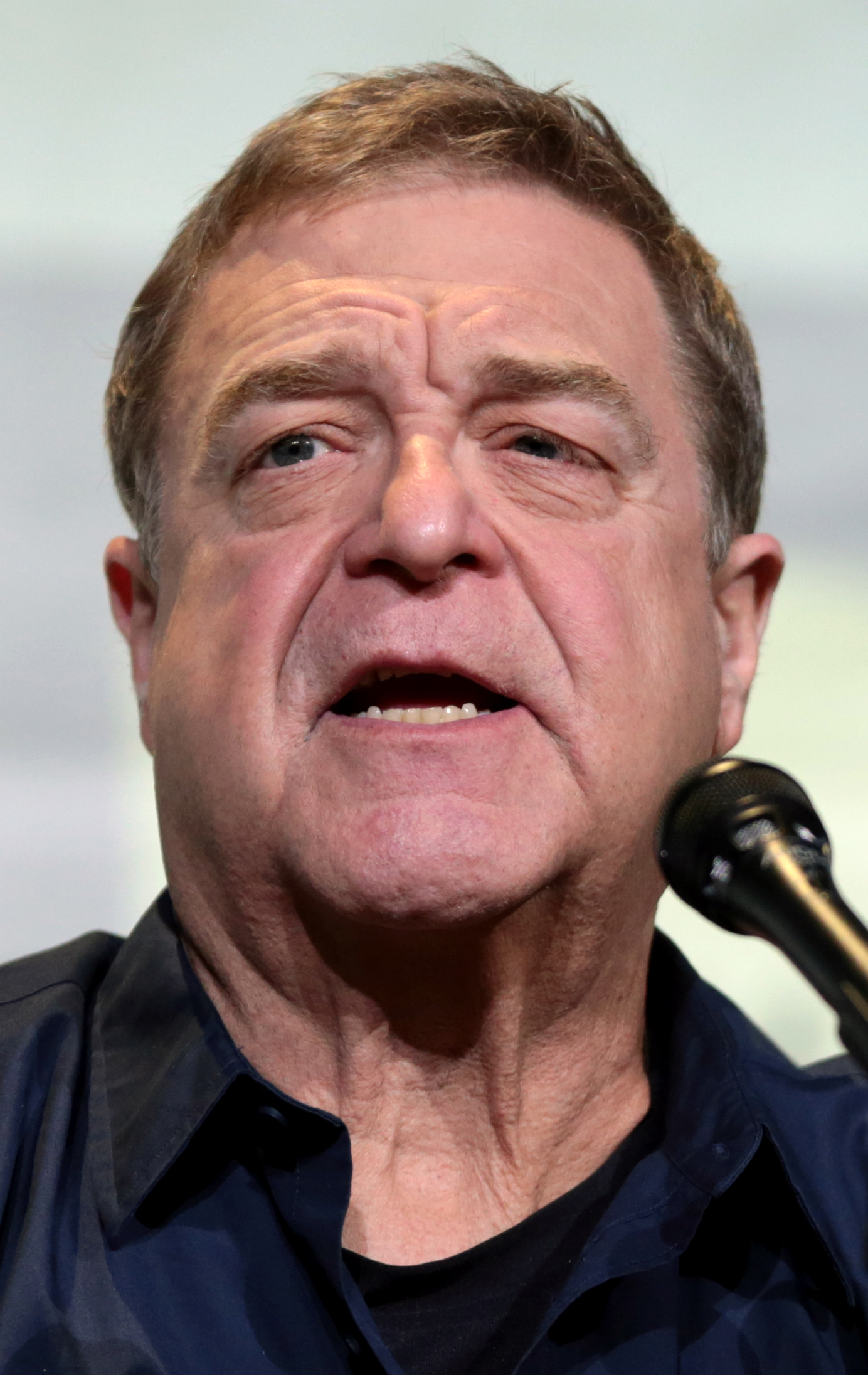
Goodman & Buscemi
- John Goodman as Harold Winter, a single father who worked as a security specialist for a chemical company, Chemerc. Let go for selling company secrets, he's being pressured to provide re-entry into Chemerc to commit yet another crime. He wants to back out, but has already taken a down payment. So he is threatened with jail time and losing his son Chris to the foster system.
- Steve Buscemi as Archie, who runs Wizard-o-Electro electronics store where Harold arranges for a machine to copy an access card.
- David Johansen (aka Buster Poindexter) as Garnet, who works as Slate's "muscle" doing his dirty work.
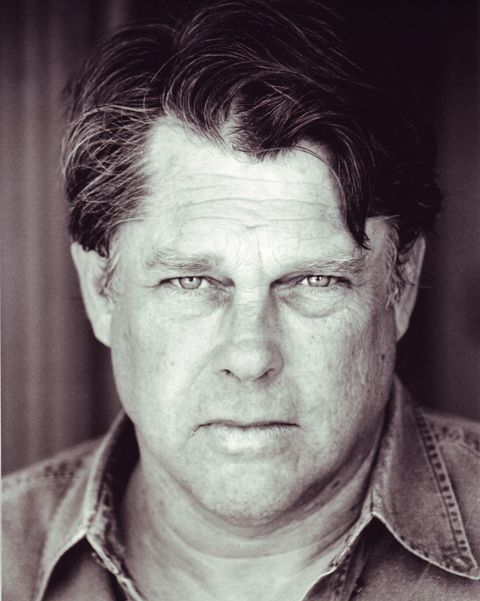
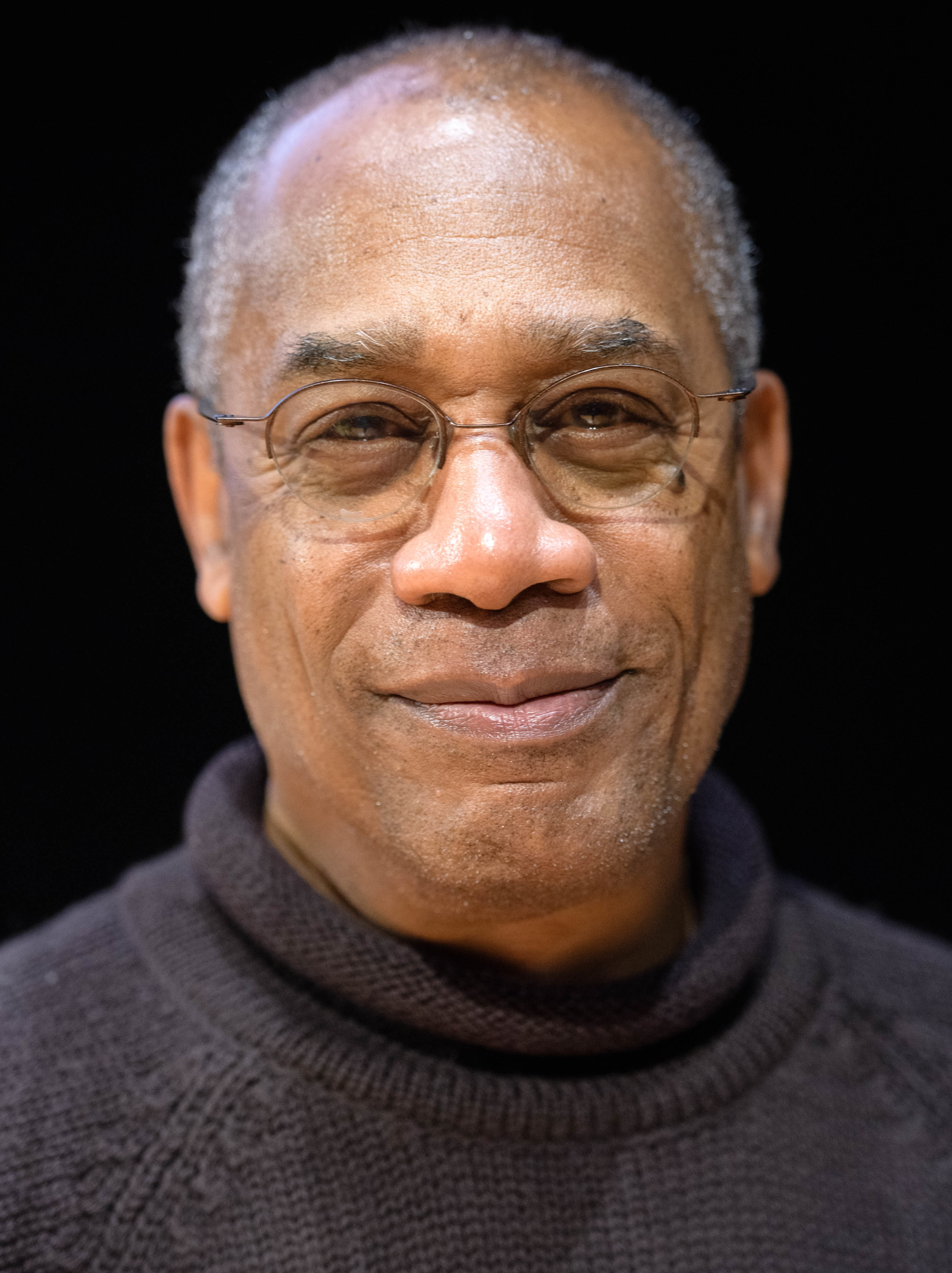
Morton & Beckel
- Joe Morton as Slate, who is after something very specific from Chemerc. He also has a silent partner in crime which he has not told Harold about, and both have been using Harold.
- Stewart Copeland as a Pickpocket, who steals a key card to access Chemerc.
- Graham Beckel as George Hershey, Harold's former boss at Chemerc, who is putting the moves on Joan Hawkins who cares more for Harold.

== Production ==
Executive Producer Coleman Luck stated, in The Story of The Equalizer special for the DVD boxset, that Universal had requested a script for a crossover episode with Magnum, P.I., despite objections from The Equalizer crew that the two shows were too different in tone; The Equalizer darker, and Magnum P.I. lighter. Ultimately the episode was never filmed, but its script was adapted, changed, and ultimately aired as "Beyond Control."
