= Hard Choices (film) =

- VHS cover
- Directed by: Rick King
- Written by: Rick King
- Story by: Robert Mickelson
- Produced by: Toby Hubner, William Kirksey, Robert Mickelson, Wendi Friedman Tush
- Starring: Margaret Klenck; John Sayles; John Seitz; J. T. Walsh; John Snyder; Martin Donovan; Spalding Gray
- Cinematography: Tom Hurwitz
- Edited by: Daniel Loewenthal
- Music by: Jay Chattaway
- Distributed by: Lorimar-Telepictures
- Release dates: 1985 (Sundance); May 16, 1986 (USA)
- Running time: 90 minutes
- Country: United States
- Language: English
- Budget: $500,000

Hard Choices is a 1985 American crime film starring Margaret Klenck, John Sayles, John Seitz, J. T. Walsh, John Snyder, Martin Donovan, and Spalding Gray. It was directed and written by Rick King from a story written by Robert Mickelson.

The film received a positive reception from Roger Ebert, Allmovie, and VideoHound's Golden Movie Retriever. The Village Voice called it a sleeper hit.

== Plot ==
A young adolescent Bobby (Gary McCleery) decides to accompany his brother along for a drive in his vehicle. While on this venture, associates of his sibling steal from a drugstore and kill a police officer who was investigating the break-in. The suspects are apprehended, and the protagonist is found guilty of the crime and jailed for his actions. The local sheriff (John Seitz) empathizes with the boy's situation. A woman counselor, Laura (Margaret Klenck), is given the young man's file and she is under the impression that he did not commit the crime. This counselor finds herself having feelings for the young man. She decides to attempt to assist him in convincing the legal system that he is not guilty. Her other option, if this fails, is to illegally ferret him out of the prison of her own accord. Laura requests a favor from her friend involved in substance abuse (John Sayles), and this friend provides her with a gun. Laura goes to the police department, holds up the sheriff and flees with Bobby. Laura's acquaintance involved with the substance abuse manages to successfully transport Bobby and Laura to Fort Lauderdale, Florida, where they may continue expressing their affectionate feelings towards one another while evading the law. As the couple plan to escape to Colombia, the police catch up with Laura and apprehend her. Bobby is able to escape and reluctantly flies to South America, agonized about leaving Laura behind.

== Production ==
=== Financing ===
The promotion budget for the film was US$40,000. The total budget for the film was $500,000.

=== Writing ===
The story for the film was derived from actual events. The script was written in 1983.

=== Filming ===
The majority of the film was set in Tennessee. These scenes were filmed in the Catskill Mountains of New York in 1984.

=== Marketing ===
Filmmakers Rick King and Robert Mickelson resorted to passing out fliers around New York City as a way to promote the film. In the three weeks leading up to the film's release, they had handed out approximately 20,000 fliers advertising their movie.

=== Release ===
Hard Choices was an entrant in the category "Dramatic Competition" at the 1985 Sundance Film Festival.

The film was released in the United States on May 16, 1986. It opened at the Embassy 72nd Street Theatre in New York City. It was released on video tape on VHS editions in 1984, and 1986, both by Karl Lorimar Home Video.

== Reception ==
Roger Ebert gave the film three-and-a-half out of four stars, and commented: "Many movies start out strong and end in confusion and compromise. 'Hard Choices' starts out like a predictable action picture, and grows and grows until at the end it astonishes us." Ebert concluded: "'Hard Choices' is a sleeper. It doesn't have any stars, was made on a small budget, is getting haphazard distribution around the country and will never be heard of by most people. No wonder it has a low profile: It's intelligent, surprising, powerful and true to itself, and that sure puts it outside the mainstream."

Vincent Canby gave the film a mixed review, writing in The New York Times: "Hard Choices is Mr. King's first dramatic feature and it's clear that he has talent. Some of the film's crucial decisions (which, I assume, he had a hand in making) are fine, especially the casting, though others don't measure up. Totally unnecessary, and off-putting, is the use of overlapping dialogue, which is supposed to keep the film moving at a breathless pace but more often interrupts it."

Dave Kehr gave the film a critical review for the Chicago Tribune, concluding: "The characters in Hard Choices remain pawns in the director's ideological game, their movements dictated not by inner necessity but the requirements of King's preprogrammed political strategies." Kehr described the plot of the movie as boring and predictable.

Writing for the Sun-Sentinel, Candice Russell likened the film to Smooth Talk directed by Joyce Chopra and She's Gotta Have It by filmmaker Spike Lee; all independent films that she said were modifying the nature of the movie business. She wrote that the film "resonates with authenticity", and that it was not a predictable story.

The Village Voice characterized Hard Choices as a "sleeper indie hit". The Sundance Institute of the Sundance Film Festival concluded: "Hard Choices is a bittersweet story that is tight, honest and well-acted." A review in the Los Angeles Times assessed: "It's a good film—not extraordinary, but solid and steady." Allmovie reviewed the film and gave it a rating of three-and-a-half out of four stars. Writing for Allmovie, Eleanor Mannikka described Hard Choices as an "odd mix of social commentary, forbidden romance, police action thriller, and teenage delinquency".

VideoHound's Golden Movie Retriever reviewed the film and gave it a rating of three stars out of four. The review praised the acting in the film: "Excellent work by Klenck, McCleery, and Seitz." The review went on to call the film: "Intelligent, surprising, and powerful." The publication concluded that "this is a low profile film that deserves to be discovered."

== See also ==
- 1985 in film
- John P. Connolly (actor)
- Lorimar-Telepictures
- Liane Curtis
