= Lezlie Deane =

American actress

- Other name: Lezlie Dean

Lezlie Deane is an American singer, musician, roller derby athlete and actress who has starred in film and television. She was once best known for her roles in horror films, including 976-EVIL (1988), Girlfriend from Hell (1989) and Freddy's Dead: The Final Nightmare (1991). In the 1990s, she was a member of the techno group Fem2Fem.

== Fem2Fem ==
In the 1990s, she was recruited by producers Peter Rafelson and Michael Lewis to join the dance-pop group Fem2Fem, and toured Europe and North America as an opening act for Nine Inch Nails and Marilyn Manson. Songs from their second album, Animus, generated three top 40 singles, including "Obsession" and "Where Did Love Go", reaching No. 1 on the UK charts. Fem2Fem is also remembered for an appearance in Playboy magazine.

After touring with Nine Inch Nails, Lezlie recorded early demos of her songs with musicians Josh Freese, Danny Lohner and Robin Finck, which would be returned to in later projects.

== Later career ==
In 2007, Deane was named captain and coach of the Slaughterers, one of five roller derby teams under the Dallas Derby Devils, and coached them to three consecutive first place seasons before leaving the league.

Deane formed the band Scary Cherry and the Bang Bangs. Dubbed "glitter punks" by their following in the UK, the group is known for their blend of 1970s punk rock and glitter rock. The band tours extensively, have received licensing of several songs and have released one five-song EP and a full-length album, Girl. The band won an Independent Music Award (Vox Populi "voice of the people") for best rock song, "Don't Wanna".

In the 2010 documentary Never Sleep Again: The Elm Street Legacy, Deane revealed that she began having flashbacks of being molested as a child during the filming of Freddy's Dead, and that she sustained an injury on set from Robert Englund, which resulted in her needing stitches and a tetanus shot.

Deane has been a volunteer board member for the Girls Rock Dallas non-profit music camp since its inception in 2011.

== Filmography ==
- 976-EVIL (1989) – Suzie
- Dynasty (1981 TV series) (1989) (TV) - Phoenix Chisolm
- Freddy's Nightmares (1989) – Sue Kaller
- Girlfriend from Hell (1989) – Diane
- Midnight Ride (1990) – Joan
- Freddy's Dead: The Final Nightmare (1991) – Tracy
- Almost Pregnant (1992) – Party Girl
- To Protect and Serve (1992) – Harriet
- Movie Madness (1992)
- A Place to Be Loved (1993) (TV) – Jeanette Glynn
- Plump Fiction (1997) – Jodi / The Gimp
- Never Sleep Again: The Elm Street Legacy (2010) – Self / Tracy (footage)
- Devotion (2013) – Wendy
