= Girlfriend from Hell =

1989 movie

Girlfriend From Hell
- Main promotional art by Enzo Sciotti
- Directed by: Daniel M. Peterson
- Written by: Daniel M. Peterson
- Produced by: Daniel M. Peterson; Alberto Lensi
- Starring: Dana Ashbrook; Liane Alexandra Curtis; Lezlie Deane; Anthony Barrile; James Daughton
- Cinematography: Gerry Lively
- Edited by: Beth Conwell
- Music by: Michael Rapp
- Distributed by: August Entertainment; International Video Entertainment
- Release date: April 24, 1989 (Houston Film Festival)
- Running time: 95 minutes
- Country: United States
- Language: English

Girlfriend From Hell is a 1989 American comedy horror film that was written and directed by Daniel M. Peterson. The film had its world premiere on April 24, 1989 at the Houston Film Festival and was released to video in August of the following year. It starred Dana Ashbrook and Liane Curtis, and follows a young high school girl who is possessed by the Devil in order to steal souls.

== Plot ==
Maggie (Liane Curtis) is a shy woman that isn't very good with men. This changes after she is possessed by Satan, who uses Maggie's body to seduce the souls out of men. Enter Chaser (Dana Ashbrook) a bounty hunter seeking redemption by pursuing Satan and working off his sins for a shot at escaping purgatory.

== Cast and characters ==
- Dana Ashbrook as Chaser
- Liane Alexandra Curtis as Maggie
- Lezlie Deane as Diane
- Anthony Barrile as Carl
- James Daughton as Thomas J. Harper
- Sarah Kaite Coughlan as Freda
- Gerry Lively as God
- Daphna Kastner as Nun With Gun
- Ken Abraham as Rocco
- Hilary Morse as Alice
- Brad Zutaut as Teddy
- Jack West as Hershel
- Renee Wayne Golden as Mother Superior
- Laura Bruneau as Sister Franks
- Kim North as Sister Beans
- Susan Rome as Nun With Gun
- Jaqueline Robinson as Nun With Gun
- James Karen as Carl's Dad
- Alba Francesca as Carl's Mom

== Reception ==
Initial critical reception was poor and Allmovie rated it at two stars.

Screened as part of their 25th Anniversary Project, Paul Freitag-Fey of Daily Grindhouse wrote it was "the type of film that sets up a mythology for the sake of a few jokes and then doesn't give a shit about it". IE: "The gun-toting nuns have nothing to do with the plot, mind you, and they have no idea they’re shooting at Satan – the filmmakers just wanted to make a joke about gun-toting nuns." They felt the viewer would do well to not concentrate on the plot, as the film was intended to be gag-based "goofy, light-hearted exploitation comedy" that did not take itself seriously.

In Creature Features: The Science Fiction, Fantasy, and Horror Movie Guide, author John Stanley praised the film, writing that it was "a supernatural/sci-fi spoof so dumb that it's fun to watch thanks to good performances by an appealing cast."

=== Stage musical ===
In 2011 playwright/composer Sean Matthew Whiteford adapted Girlfriend from Hell into a stage musical. The transformative musical features 20 songs and a much revamped storyline. It premiered at the Gene Frankel Theatre in the East Village in 2011. In April 2015, a concert version of the musical was presented at 54 Below, Broadway's Supper Club in NYC, following an evening of Patti LuPone. On August 1, 2015, another concert version was presented at The Cutting Room in NYC. A studio cast recording was made in Winter 2016 featuring Justin Matthew Sargent, Josephine Rose Roberts & Neka Zang. In 2019, Deb Miller of DC Metro Theatre Arts raved that “Whiteford’s hilarious high school horror show has the makings of a rock musical cult classic.” A website for the musical, girlfriendfromhellmusical.com was launched in 2020.
