= Margaret Klenck =

American actress born 1953

Margaret Klenck M.Div., LP
- Born: January 9, 1953 (age 72); Reading, Pennsylvania, US
- Education: American Conservatory Theater; Union Theological Seminary (New York)
- Occupations: Actress; Analyst; Teacher
- Years active: 1977–1993
- Organization: Jungian Psychoanalytic Association
- Spouse: Tom Hurwitz

Margaret L. Klenck, M.Div., LP (born January 9, 1953, in Reading, Pennsylvania, US), is a former American stage and screen actor and a leader of the Jungian analysis profession and president of the Jungian Psychoanalytic Association.

== Career ==
=== Acting ===
Her acting career began after her graduation in 1977 from the American Conservatory Theater in San Francisco. In 1978 she began portraying Edwina "Cookie" Lewis Dane on the soap opera One Life to Live and continued in that role until 1985. She also played Kitty Fielding on As the World Turns in 1993. She has also performed in theaters across the country and on Broadway, and gave a critically acclaimed starring performance in the film Hard Choices (1985), in which she played a social worker who becomes romantically involved with a drug dealer. She has also appeared in numerous movies of the week and episodic television guest star roles. She portrayed a rural veterinarian on the science fiction series Starman in the episode "Peregrine" (November 1986). As part of the promotion for her soap opera work, Klenck appeared in a two-part filmed television segment discussing and showing the cutting of her long hair to a shorter style.

=== Jungian analyst ===
She is a Jungian Analyst in private practice in New York City and the president of the Jungian Psychoanalytic Association in New York, where she also teaches and supervises. She is a member of the C. G. Jung Institute of Philadelphia and has served on the faculty there and at the Blanton-Peale Institute. She has lectured and taught nationally and internationally as an authority on the life and thought of Carl Jung. She is a graduate of the C.G. Jung Institute of New York and holds a Master of Divinity (M.Div.) from Union Theological Seminary (New York), where she concentrated in Psychology and Religion. In 2004 she participated in a discussion with scientists, theorists and professors presented as a documentary in two parts by PBS as The Question of God: Sigmund Freud and C.S. Lewis, discussing the existence or non-existence of God based on ideas about the sources of morality and other indications.

== Erroneous obituary ==
The New York Times erroneously printed her obituary prominently in its August 26, 1993, issue, confusing her with the late African American actress whose name, Edwina Lewis, matched the name of the character Klenck played on One Life to Live. Lewis died of a heart attack at age 42 three days before the obituary appeared. Klenck's agent at Ambrosio/Mortimer reported that they began answering the telephone by saying, "Ambrosio/Mortimer-She's-Not-Dead" because of the volume of calls about Klenck's status. At the time Klenck commented, "The Times and Variety—just great. It means I'm dead on both coasts. If there was an upside, I got to attend my own funeral, in a way. There were memorials being planned. I saw that many people out there loved and respected me." She commented later that by coincidence this obituary marked her transition from acting to her present profession in Jungian psychology.

== Personal life ==
She is married to cinematographer and director Tom Hurwitz; they have one child.

== Filmography ==
Margaret Klenck film and television credits
Year	Title	Role	Notes	Ref.
1978–1985	One Life to Live	Edwina "Cookie" Lewis Dane	70 episodes (Recurring role)	
1985	Hard Choices	Laura Stephens	Theatrical Film (U.S. release, 1986)	
1986	Starman	Casey Flynn	Episode: "Peregrine"	
1986	The Twilight Zone	Denny McDowell	1 episode	
1988	My Father, My Son	Kathy	Television film	
1989	The Equalizer	Laura	Episode: "Heart of Justice"	
1991	Dead and Alive: The Race For Gus Farace	Unknown	Television film	
1992	As the World Turns	Kitty Fielding	4 episodes	
