= Liane Curtis =

American actress

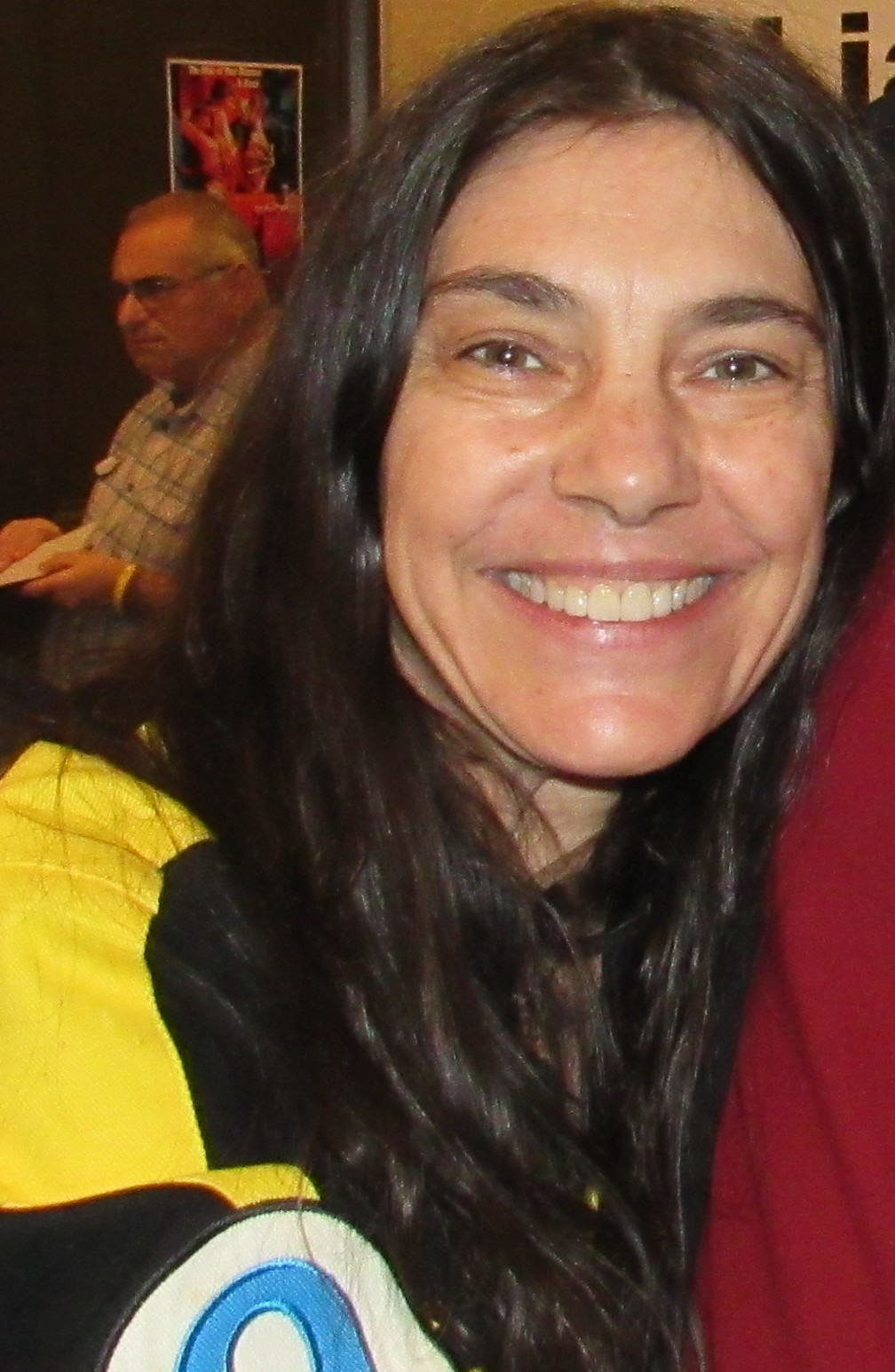
- Curtis in 2019
- Born: Liane Alexandra Curtis; July 11, 1965 (age 60)
- Occupations: Actress; producer; songwriter
- Years active: 1983–present

Liane Alexandra Curtis (born July 11, 1965) is an American film and television actress and musician, known for her appearances in B movies, such as Critters 2: The Main Course (1988) and Girlfriend from Hell (1989), as well as smaller roles in films such as Sixteen Candles (1984).

== Career ==
Curtis' feature film debut was Baby It's You (1983) directed by John Sayles.

== Filmography ==
=== Film ===
Year	Title	Role	Notes
1983	Baby It's You	Jody, High School Girl	
1984	Sixteen Candles	Randy	
1984	The Brother from Another Planet	Ace	
1985	Hard Choices	Maureen	Uncredited
1988	Kenny	Sharon Kay	
1988	Critters 2: The Main Course	Megan Morgan	
1989	Girlfriend from Hell	Maggie	
1991	Queens Logic	Cashier	
1991	Rock 'n' Roll High School Forever	Stella	
1991	Wild Orchid II: Two Shades of Blue	Mona	
1993	Benny & Joon	Claudia	
1994	Erotique	Murphy	Segment "Let's Talk About Love"
1998	Soundman	Kate	
2003	The Failures	Samantha Kyle	
2007	Have Love, Will Travel	Beverly	
2011	Angel Falls in Love	Aunt CoCo	
2014	Salt Liquor Lime	Marie	
2015	Body High	Allison Osgood	
2018	Selfie	Nancy Logan	

=== Television ===
Year	Title	Role	Notes
1985	The Best Times	Annette Dimetriano	6 episodes
1987	The Equalizer	Elaine	Episode: "Beyond Control"
1987	Married... with Children	Debbie	1 episode
1987	21 Jump Street	Lauren Carlson	1 episode
1987	Knots Landing	Young Karen	1 episode
1988	The Bronx Zoo	Joanie Barris	1 episode
1990	Kojak: None So Blind	Lorraine	TV movie
1990–1991	WIOU	Trudy	10 episodes
1991	Reason for Living: The Jill Ireland Story	Lori	TV movie
1992	Exclusive	Carol	TV movie
1995	Trial by Fire	Doreen	TV movie
2001	ER	Mrs. Shayotovich, Fossen's Neighbor	2 episodes
2003	Threat Matrix	Counter Waitress	1 episode
2003	Line of Fire	Hooker 2	1 episode
2008	Sons of Anarchy	April	1 episode
