= Fem2Fem =

American techno group

- Origin: United States
- Genres: Techno
- Years active: 1993–1997
- Label: Critique Records
- Past members: Michelle Crispin; LaLa Hamparsomian; Diedra Lang; Lezlie Denise Lonon; Christina Minna; Julie Park; Lynn Pompey; Alitzah "Ali" Navarro; Jennifer Lynn Wolf

Fem2Fem was an American techno group who released three albums in the 1990s. Featuring actress Lezlie Deane as a member, Fem2Fem were the first openly lesbian pop group to chart, although the band did contain both straight and gay women. The band appeared in the December 1993 issue of Playboy magazine.

== History ==
The group was assembled by producers Peter Rafelson and Michael Lewis as a "pop project of dance music". Produced by Rafelson, with songs written by Rafelson and Lewis, Fem2Fem featured post-rave, pre-trance arrangements. The cover of their first album, including the font, was designed to be a distaff version of Trans-Europe Express by Kraftwerk.

Christina Minna (manager Michael Lewis' step daughter) was not in the group when Julie Ann Park, Michelle Crispin, Lynn Pompey, Lezlie Deane and Jennifer Wolf posed for Playboy magazine in December 1993. Wolf left the group before a live performance occurred. Crispin left the group after disagreements with the management and Park soon followed.

Andrea Adams later joined the group and sang lead vocals on the hit single "Where Did Love Go" from the group's second album, Animus. Fem2Fem, with Christina Minna, LaLa Hamparsomian, and Lezlie Deane went on to star in the cyber-musical Voyeurz Produced by Michael White (Rocky Horror Picture Show), at the Whitehall Theatre, London, in July 1996, running for six months and drawing an audience of celebrities including Jack Nicholson. Adams left the group before Voyeurz. The original cast album sold out its entire pressing. Some of the songs from Animus were featured in the show. That album generated three top 40 singles, including "Obsession" and "Where Did Love Go", reaching No. 1 on the UK charts.

== Discography ==
Woman to Woman

Studio album by Fem2fem
- Released: August 24, 1993
- Genre: Techno
- Length: 55:40
- Label: Critique Records

=== Woman to Woman (1993) ===
1. "Switch" – 5:17
2. "Obsession" – 5:09
3. "Woman to Woman" – 3:50
4. "All About Eve" – 4:35
5. "I Lose Myself" – 5:12
6. "Coming Out" – 4:20
7. "Waiting in Tangier" – 4:39
8. "Charmed" – 4:33
9. "Freedom of Choice" – 4:47
10. "Switch" (Erotic Trance Mix) [bonus track] – 7:01
11. "Woman to Woman" (Extended Mix) [bonus track] – 6:17

=== Animus (1995) ===
1. "Animus" – 3:20
2. "Sin" – 3:32
3. "Insatiable" – 3:04
4. "Naked Heart" – 3:54
5. "Swing" – 5:54
6. "Compulsive Jane" – 4:32
7. "Where Did Love Go" – 4:30
8. "Cruel & Unusual" – 4:18
9. "Make Me Love U" – 4:35
10. "Scream Queen" – 4:43
11. "Worship" – 7:25
12. "Animus Reprise" – 1:43
13. "Where Did Love Go" (Bak2BASSiks Remix) [bonus track] – 6:26
14. "Take Control" [bonus track] – 4:08

=== Voyeurz (1996) ===
1. "Intro/Dreamtime"
2. "Animus"
3. "Sin"
4. "Reflections"
5. "Sex on a Train"
6. "Out in Style"
7. "The Hole"
8. "Xtropia"
9. "So Confused"
10. "Swing"
11. "Can't Talk Now"
12. "Kinda Slow Now"
13. "More's the Pity"
14. "Insatiable"
15. "Are You Insane"
16. "Go for the Kill"
17. "Nature's in Conflict"
18. "Cruel and Unusual"
19. "Until the Dawn"
20. "Animus (Reprise)"
21. "Tantric Trance"
22. "I'd Die for You"
23. "Stand Back"
24. "I'm So Sorry"
25. "Compulsive Jane"
26. "Evil"
27. "Worship"
28. "Finale"
29. "Where Did Love Go"

== Members ==
- LaLa Avedis Hamparsomian - lead vocals
- Michelle Crispin - lead vocals on first album
- Lezlie Denise Lonon (aka Lezlie Deane)
- Christina Minna – lead vocals
- Julie Park
- Lynn Pompey
- Jennifer Lynn Wolf

== Sources ==
- Fem2Fem on Allmusic
- Peter Rafelson interview
- Michelle Crispin interview
