= Love or Physical =

Studio album by Ashford & Simpson
- Released: 1989
- Studios: Above Asia, New York City; Science Lab, New York City; Axis, New York City; Sigma, New York City
- Label: Capitol
- Producers: Nickolas Ashford, Valerie Simpson

Ashford & Simpson chronology
Real Love (1986)	Love or Physical (1989)	Been Found (1996)

Love or Physical is an album by the American musical duo Ashford & Simpson, released in 1989. The first single was "I'll Be There for You". The duo would not record another album until their collaboration with Maya Angelou in 1996, Been Found. The album peaked at No. 135 on the Billboard 200.

== Production ==
The title track was originally called "Honest to Goodness Love"; it in part alludes to AIDS and infidelity.

== Critical reception ==
Professional ratings
Review scores
Source	Rating
AllMusic	3/5 stars
The Encyclopedia of Popular Music	2/5 stars
Los Angeles Times	2.5/5 stars

The Los Angeles Times wrote that "In Your Arms" "is the loveliest and most genuinely sensual ballad this husband-and-wife duo has recorded in a long time." The St. Louis Post-Dispatch noted that "their sound is impeccably produced but actually quite sparse in spots."

The Advocate stated that "the title track is a fresh urban-contemporary approach to male-female relationships." USA Today concluded that the album "goes beyond carnal concerns and explores deeper matters." The Dallas Morning News concluded that "it's still a pleasure to listen when the vocal interplay between these two veterans turns dexterous, as it does on the romantic ballad 'I'll Be There for You'."

== Track listing ==
All tracks are written by Nickolas Ashford and Valerie Simpson, except where noted.

No.	Title	Writer(s)	Length
1.	"Love or Physical"		4:24
2.	"I'll Be There for You"		4:38
3.	"Comes with the Package"		4:15
4.	"Til We Get It Right"		5:07
5.	"Something to You"		4:59
6.	"In Your Arms"	Bruce Roberts, Edgar Bronfman, Jr.	4:39
7.	"Cookies and Cake"		4:43
8.	"Timing"		4:52

== Personnel ==
- Nickolas Ashford – vocals on all tracks; arrangements on all tracks except "Comes with the Package"; additional percussion on "Love or Physical" and "Timing"; drum programming and percussion on "I'll Be There for You" and "Cookies and Cake"; backing vocals on "Til We Get It Right"
- Valerie Simpson – vocals on all tracks; arrangements on all tracks except "Comes with the Package"; additional synthesizers on "Love or Physical"; synthesizers on "I'll Be There for You", "Til We Get It Right" and "Something to You"; additional percussion on "Love or Physical" and "Timing", drum programming and percussion on "I'll Be There for You" and "Cookies and Cake"; backing vocals on "Til We Get It Right"; synth solo on "Cookies and Cake"
- Kevin Jones – Synclavier programming
- Danny Sembello – keyboards and synthesizers on "Love or Physical"; keyboard solo on "Love or Physical"; synthesizers on "Timing"; drum programming and arrangements on "Love or Physical" and "Timing"
- Joseph Joubert – additional synthesizers on "Love or Physical", "In Your Arms" and "Cookies and Cake"; synthesizers and arrangements on "I'll Be There for You", "Til We Get It Right" and "Something to You"
- David Frank – synthesizers and arrangements on "Comes with the Package"
- Leon Pendarvis – synthesizers and arrangements on "In Your Arms"
- Lenny Underwood – keyboard overdubs on "Cookies and Cake"
- Ira Siegel – guitars on "Comes with the Package" and "In Your Arms"
- Nile Rodgers – guitars on "Timing"
- Jimmy Bralower – drum programming on "Til We Get It Right", "Something to You", and "In Your Arms"
- Bashiri Johnson – congas and percussion on "Something to You"
- V. Jeffrey Smith – saxophone solo on "Something to You"
- Mic Murphy – arrangements on "Comes with the Package"
- Edgar Bronfman Jr. – arrangements on "In Your Arms"
- Bruce Roberts – arrangements on "In Your Arms"

Production

- Nickolas Ashford – producer on all tracks except "Comes with the Package"
- Valerie Simpson – producer on all tracks except "Comes with the Package"
- David Frank – producer on "Comes with the Package"
- Mic Murphy – producer on "Comes with the Package"
- Kevin Jones – recording on all tracks except "Comes with the Package"; vocal recording on "Cookies and Cake" and "Timing"
- Stephen Seltzer – recording and mix assistant on "Comes with the Package"
- Jimmy Simpson – vocal recording on "Cookies and Cake" and "Timing"
- Michael Hutchinson – mixing and supervision on all tracks except "Cookies and Cake" and "Timing"
- François Kervorkian – mixing on "Cookies and Cake"; mixing and guitar recording on "Timing"
- Nick Delre – mix assistant on "Love or Physical", "I'll Be There for You", "Til We Get It Right", "Something to You", and "In Your Arms"
- Goh Hotoda – mix assistant on "Cookies and Cake" and "Timing"
- George Marino – mastering at Sterling Sound (New York, NY)
- Tee Alston – album coordinator
- Tommy Steele – art direction
- Susan Silton – design
- Timothy White – album photography
- James Finney – hair, make-up
