= Real Love (Ashford & Simpson album) =

Studio album by Ashford & Simpson
- Released: 1986
- Studio: 39th Street Music, New York City; Blank Tape, New York City; Unique, New York City
- Genre: R&B, soul, pop
- Label: Capitol
- Producer: Ashford & Simpson

Ashford & Simpson chronology
Solid (1984)	Real Love (1986)	Love or Physical (1989)

Real Love is an album by the American R&B duo Ashford & Simpson, released in 1986 via Capitol Records.

The album peaked at No. 74 on the Billboard 200. It was nominated for a Grammy Award for "Best R&B Performance by a Duo or Group with Vocal". The duo promoted the album with an appearance on One Life to Live and a North American tour.

== Production ==
All of the tracks were written and produced by Ashford & Simpson. Stevie Wonder contributed a harmonica solo to "Nobody Walks in L.A."

== Critical reception ==
Professional ratings
Review scores
Source	Rating
AllMusic	3/5 stars
Robert Christgau	B
The Encyclopedia of Popular Music	3/5 stars
Record Mirror	2/5
The Rolling Stone Album Guide	3/5 stars

The Washington Post declared that Ashford & Simpson "haven't lost their knack for knockout hooks, and they have a talent for telling tales to suit the top ten." Robert Christgau wrote that "not even 'Nobody Walks in L.A.', which makes good on its title but is too quirky and local for a single, takes it on home." The Los Angeles Times thought that "Count Your Blessings" possesses "the slick, black adult-contemporary sound that has become Ashford and Simpson’s stock in trade." The Gazette called the album "more seamless songs of love, loss and inspiration from the yuppies of soul."

== Track listing ==
No.	Title	Length
1.	"Count Your Blessings"	4:53
2.	"Real Love"	4:03
3.	"Nobody Walks in L.A."	5:38
4.	"How Does It Fit"	4:08
5.	"Relations"	5:17
6.	"What Becomes of Love"	5:59
7.	"Way Ahead"	4:01
8.	"10th Round"	4:22
Total length:		38:21

== Personnel ==
- Nickolas Ashford – lead and backing vocals on all tracks; drum programming on all tracks except "Count Your Blessings" and "Nobody Walks in L.A."; percussion on "Real Love" and "What Becomes of Love"
- Valerie Simpson – lead and backing vocals on all tracks, vocal solo on "What Becomes of Love"; drum programming and synthesizers on all tracks except "Count Your Blessings" and "Nobody Walks in L.A."; percussion on "Real Love" and "What Becomes of Love"; acoustic piano solo on "How Does It Fit"
- Joseph Joubert – synthesizers and arrangements on all tracks; synth solo on "What Becomes of Love"; acoustic piano on "10th Round"
- John Mahoney – Synclavier assistance
- Doc Powell – guitars on "Relations"
- Francisco Centeno – bass on "Count Your Blessings", "Real Love", "Nobody Walks in L.A.", and "Way Ahead"
- Ivan Hampden Jr. – drums on "Count Your Blessings"
- Steve Gadd – drums on "Nobody Walks in L.A."
- Jimmy Simpson – percussion on "Nobody Walks in L.A."; drum programming on "Relations"
- Sammy Figueroa – percussion on "Relations"
- Vinny Della Rocca – saxophone solo on "Real Love"
- Stevie Wonder – harmonica solo on "Nobody Walks in L.A."
- Ray Simpson – backing vocals on "Real Love", "Nobody Walks in L.A.", "How Does It Fit", "What Becomes of Love", and "10th Round"
- Ullanda McCullough – backing vocals on "Real Love", "Nobody Walks in L.A.", "How Does It Fit", "What Becomes of Love", and "10th Round"

Production

- Ashford & Simpson – producers, arrangements, liner notes
- Roey Shamir – recording on "Count Your Blessings"
- Tim Cox – rhythm recording
- Barney Bristol – rhythm recording assistant
- John Paul Canavaugh – rhythm recording
- Joe Arlotta – vocal recording
- François Kervorkian – mixing on "Count Your Blessings" and "Real Love"
- Ron St. Germain – mixing on "Count Your Blessings" and "Real Love"
- Michael Hutchinson – mixing on all tracks except "Count Your Blessings" and "Real Love"
- George Marino – mastering at Sterling Sound (New York, NY)
- Jimmy Simpson – mastering supervisor, production supervisor
- Tee Alston – album coordinator
- Roy Kohara – art direction
- Peter Shea – design
- Paul Jasmin – photography
- Visages – photography
