= List of Hurst-Euless-Bedford Independent School District schools =

The Hurst-Euless-Bedford Independent School District operates 21 elementary schools, 5 junior high schools, 2 traditional high schools, 1 non-traditional high school, and 2 major sports fields. It serves the city of Bedford, Texas, most of the cities of Euless, Hurst, and small parts of Fort Worth, Arlington, Colleyville, and North Richland Hills.

== High schools ==
High schools in the Hurst-Euless-Bedford ISD serve students in the 10th grade through the 12th grade.

School name	City	Street address	Mascot/colors	Date established	Notes	Refs
L.D. Bell High School	Hurst	1601 Brown Trail	Blue Raiders	1957	Current campus established 1965. 1994-96 National Blue Ribbon School. Orchestra School of Choice.	
Trinity High School	Euless	500 North Industrial Boulevard	Trojans	1968	Campus established 1968 as a unique open campus environment. Ranked as the most diverse high school in Texas by Niche in 2017.	
KEYS High School (Note: Also known as KEYS Learning Center, but name usage is shifting towards KEYS High School as per District sources.)	Euless	1100 Raider Drive	Phoenixes	1987	On former Bell High School campus on Raider Drive. Non-traditional high school for at-risk students from Bell and Trinity.	

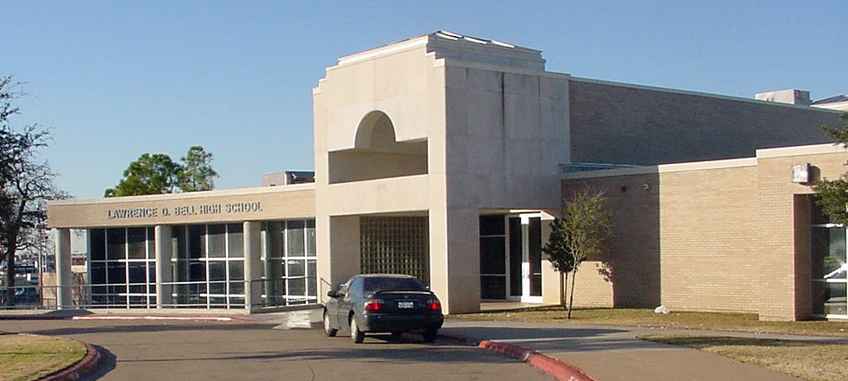
L.D. Bell High School

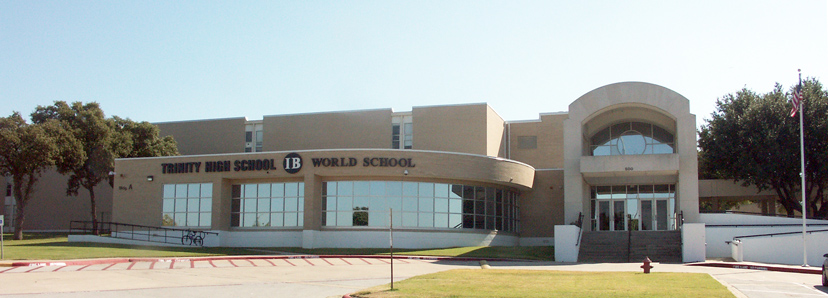
Trinity High School

== Junior high schools ==
Junior high schools in the Hurst-Euless-Bedford ISD serve students in the 7th grade through the 9th grade.

School name	City	Street address	Mascot/colors	Date established	Notes	Refs
Bedford Junior High School	Bedford	325 Carolyn Drive	Broncos	1972	Built at the same time as with Harwood Junior High School with exactly the same layout.	
Central Junior High School	Euless	3191 West Pipeline Road	Spartans	1965	Current building built in 1989. National Blue Ribbon School 2010. STEM, IBI, and Orchestra School of Choice. Ranked the second most diverse middle school in Texas in 2017.	
Euless Junior High School	Euless	306 West Airport Freeway	Stallions	1962	Texas Business & Education Coalition (TBEC) "Just for the Kids" Honor Roll School 2005. Ranked the eighth most diverse middle school in Texas in 2017.	
Harwood Junior High School	Bedford	3000 Martin Drive	Blackhawks	1972	Built at the same time as Bedford Junior High School with exactly the same layout. Mascot formerly the "Hawks". National Blue Ribbon School 1986-1987.	
Hurst Junior High School	Hurst	500 Harmon Road	Red Raiders	1959	Formerly North Hurst Elementary School. Current campus opened in 2000. National Blue Ribbon School 2010.	

== Elementary schools ==
Most elementary schools in the Hurst-Euless-Bedford ISD serve students in pre-kindergarten through the 6th grade. However, where indicated by an asterisk (*), the school serves students in kindergarten through the 6th grade.

School name	City	Street address	Mascot/colors	Date established	Notes	Refs
Arbor Creek Elementary School	Euless	701 International Drive	Cardinals	2020		
Bedford Heights Elementary School*	Bedford	1000 Cummings Road	Bulldogs	1976	Rated "Exemplary" by the TEA in 2008 and 2009. Spanish Immersion School of Choice.	
Bell Manor Elementary School	Bedford	1300 Winchester Way	Bobcats	1969	Rated "Exemplary" by the TEA in 2009.	
Bellaire Elementary School	Hurst	501 Bellaire Drive	Whirlybirds	1960	Suzuki Strings School of Choice.	
Donna Park Elementary School	Hurst	1125 Scott Drive	Mustangs	1966		
Harrison Lane Elementary School	Hurst	1000 Harrison Lane	Bulldogs	1959		
Hurst Hills Elementary School*	Hurst	1525 Billie Ruth Lane	Falcons	1969	Designated model Official Core Knowledge Visitation Site, one of 42 such sites in the United States. Rated "Exemplary" by TEA in 2009. Suzuki Strings School of Choice.	
Lakewood Elementary School*	Euless	1600 Donley Drive	Eagles	1972	Rated "Exemplary" by TEA in 2008 and 2009. Suzuki Strings School of Choice.	
Meadow Creek Elementary School*	Bedford	3001 Harwood Road	Dolphins	1989	Rated "Exemplary" by TEA in 2006, 2007, 2008, 2009, 2010, and 2011. Spanish Immersion School of Choice.	
Midway Park Elementary School	Euless	409 North Ector Drive	Parrots	1967	First elementary school "in-the-round"; i.e. with a perfectly circle-shaped campus.	
North Euless Elementary School	Euless	1101 Denton Drive	Cowboys	1958	Rated "Exemplary" by TEA in 2008, 2009, and 2010. Suzuki Strings School of Choice.	
Oakwood Terrace Elementary School	Euless	700 Ranger Road	Owls	1962		
River Trails Elementary School*	Fort Worth	8850 Elbe Trail	Tigers	2002	Built following the approval of a 1997 municipal bond. Texas Business and Education Coalition (TBEC) Honor Roll School in 2008 and 2009. Rated "Exemplary" by TEA in 2008 and 2009. Suzuki Strings School of Choice.	
Shady Brook Elementary School*	Bedford	2601 Shady Brook Drive	Shetlands	1971	Renovated in 2001. Rated "Exemplary" by TEA in 2009. Suzuki Strings School of Choice.	
Shady Oaks Elementary School	Hurst	1400 Cavender Drive	Chaparrals	1959	Texas Business and Education Coalition (TBEC) Honor Roll School in 2006, 2007, and 2009. Rated "Exemplary" by TEA in 2007, 2008, and 2009.	
South Euless Elementary School	Euless	605 South Euless Main Street	Stars	1913	Formerly called the Euless School. Current campus built in 1973. Former mascot was the "Roadrunners". Rated "Exemplary" by TEA in 2009. Suzuki Strings School of Choice.	
Spring Garden Elementary School	Bedford	2400 Cummings Drive	Cougars	1982	Rated "Exemplary" by TEA in 2008 and 2009. Suzuki Strings School of Choice.	
Stonegate Elementary School	Bedford	900 Bedford Road	Stallions	1962		
Trinity Lakes Elementary School	Fort Worth	2520 S. Precinct Line Rd	Lions	2020	Replaced West Hurst Elementary (est. 1958)	
Viridian Elementary School*	Arlington	4001 Cascade Sky Drive	Vipers	2014	Spanish Immersion, Suzuki Strings, and IBI School of Choice.	
Wilshire Elementary School	Euless	420 Wilshire Drive	Wildcats	1964	Designated model Official Core Knowledge Visitation Site, one of 42 such sites in the United States. Texas Business & Education Coalition (TBEC) Honor Roll school in 2007 and 2008. Rated "Exemplary" by TEA in 2008. Suzuki Strings School of Choice. The most diverse elementary school in Texas in 2017, as per Niche.	

== Other facilities ==
Facility name	City	Street address	Description	Refs
Administration Building	Bedford	1849A Central Drive	Main District administration building. Board of Trustees room and Superintendent's office are located here.	
Auxiliary Services Facility	Euless	1350 West Euless Boulevard	Houses various District services, including bus transportation.	
Crossroads Alternative Education Program	Bedford	900 Bedford Road	Location of disciplinary elementary alternative education program for students with behavioral issues in grades K-6. On the campus of Stonegate Elementary School.	
Gene A. Buinger Career and Technical Education Academy	Bedford	1849E Central Drive	Location of most technical and STEM classes for Trinity and Bell high school students. Replaced the old Technical Education center in 2014. Although officially not a high school in its own right, its unofficial mascot is the "Bees".	
H-E-B Field	Euless	3191 West Pipeline Road	Used for track meets, football games, soccer games, and various other events at the junior high level. Located on the campus of Central Junior High. Has double set of bleachers, announcer's booth, score board, and track.	
Pat May Center	Bedford	1849B Central Drive	Professional development and conference center. Built using 1997 municipal bond funding.	
Pennington Field	Bedford	1501 Central Drive	Multi-purpose stadium with a capacity of 12,000 spectators. Home of Trinity and Bell high school American football, soccer, band, and gymnastics programs since 1987. Renovated in 2003.	
Secondary Alternative Education Program	Euless	1100 Raider Drive	Location of disciplinary secondary alternative education program for students with behavioral issues in grades 7 through 12. Adjacent to KEYS High School and Central Junior High School.	
Transition Center	Bedford	1849F Central Drive	Classes on campus provide skills for transitioning between public school life and adult life for students ages 19 through 21.	
