= Gene A. Buinger Career and Technical Education Academy =

Location
- 1849E Central Drive; Bedford, Tarrant County, Texas 76022; United States; 32°50′07″N 97°08′12″W

Information
- Type: Public technical high school
- Established: 2014
- School district: Hurst-Euless-Bedford Independent School District
- Director: Lisa Karr
- Faculty: 30 (2017-18)
- Grades: 10-12
- Enrollment: estimated 1,200 per day (also see Bell HS and Trinity HS)
- Colors: Brown and teal
- Mascot: Bee (unofficial), Blue Raider and Trojan (official)
- Website: bctea.hebisd.edu

The Gene A. Buinger Career and Technical Education Academy (also colloquially known as the Buinger Academy, BCTEA, or Tech Center) is a public technical high school in Bedford, Texas. The school serves grade levels 10–12 and is part of the Hurst-Euless-Bedford Independent School District.

The Buinger Academy is not a traditional high school; it does not directly enroll students and students cannot graduate with a diploma from the Academy. Instead, it hosts career and technical education classes for Trinity and L.D. Bell high schools, and students are transported to and from their classes at the Academy by school bus.

== History ==
The Buinger Academy is essentially a reincarnation of Hurst-Euless-Bedford ISD's aging Technical Education Center that was built in 1971 and torn down during the expansion of Texas State Highway 183.

On 14 May 2011, voters in the Hurst-Euless-Bedford Independent School District passed a bond measure that would replace air conditioning units at many district elementary schools, build the new Viridian Elementary School, and also pay for the construction of a new technical education academy. The purpose of the new Academy was to expand career and technology education opportunities for students at Trinity and Bell high schools, as well as to free up instructional space at those campuses, which were beginning to suffer from overcrowding that began to necessitate the erection of portable temporary buildings.

The new technical education academy was christened the Gene A. Buinger Career and Technical Education Academy to honor Hurst-Euless-Bedford ISD's superintendent for 14 years, Dr. Gene Buinger.

The Buinger Academy was completed in the summer of 2014 on the site of the Hurst-Euless-Bedford ISD's old bus barn and opened to students for the 2014-15 school year at a cost of $25,070,234. The site of the old Technical Education Center is now the parking lot of the Buinger Academy.

As of 2018, the Buinger Academy is considering implementing the International Baccalaureate Career-related Programme. If the CP is implemented, the Buinger Academy will be one of less than 100 schools in the United States to offer it. Proposals have also been made to make the Buinger Academy a full-fledged diploma-granting school separate from L.D. Bell and Trinity.

== Campus ==
The Buinger Academy is a two-story, 142,029 or 146,000 square foot (13,195 or 13,564 square meter) building. It was described by Dr. Larry Teverbaugh of CareerSafe as "[having] the look and feel of a technology company - glass, steel, high ceilings and large open areas for students to mingle or work on class projects". The Academy was built with environmental sustainability in mind, with energy-efficient LED lighting, water-saving taps, and extensive natural lighting implemented in its design.

The Academy has the usual features of a school, such as numerous classrooms, a cafeteria, a lecture theater, a small library, and computer labs. However, its status as a special campus dedicated to CTE education results in many nontraditional features. The Academy has a professional-grade kitchen, workrooms with 3-D printers and CNC machines, a facility for cosmetology, as well as a full-fledged auto and body shop.

== Programs ==
=== Areas of study ===
The front façade of the Buinger Academy in 2017

The many career and technical education courses offered at the Academy can be broadly categorized into the following:

- Architecture and Construction
- Arts, A/V Technology, and Communication
- Business, Management, and Administration
- Education and Training
- Health Science
- Hospitality and Tourism
- Human Services
- Information Technology
- Law, Public Safety, Corrections, and Security
- Marketing and Finance
- Science, Technology, Engineering, and Mathematics
- Transportation, Distribution, and Logistics

=== Special activities ===
The Buinger Academy, in addition to hosting career and technical courses for Hurst-Euless-Bedford ISD students, also includes many extracurricular organizations and activities that take place off-campus.

==== Arts and communication ====
For students interested in digital arts and communication, the Buinger Academy is home to an Audio/Visual club and Art & Animation Society.

==== Business ====
The Hurst-Euless-Bedford chapter of the Future Business Leaders of America, founded in 2016, actively participates in Future Business Leaders of America-Phi Beta Lambda conferences and competitions. In 2018, its first year in competition, all of its participants advanced to the Texas state competition in Dallas, Texas.

==== Education ====
Buinger Academy is host to a chapter of the Texas Association of Future Educators. Members of Buinger Academy's TAFE chapter have advanced to state and national competition.

==== Engineering ====
The Buinger Academy's Aerospace program participates in the annual IGNITE SystemsGo rocketry competition and exhibition in Fredericksburg, Texas. Students taking Honors Aerospace Practicum also have the opportunity to compete in the Team America Rocketry Challenge.

BCTEA Robotics was formed in summer 2016 when Trinity High School's robotics program was moved to the Buinger Academy to also serve students from L.D. Bell High School. BCTEA Robotics competes in the FIRST Tech Challenge competition, fielding three teams (4745 Thorn's Army, 6169 Men in Black, and 13657 Wonder Women). In 2017, 4745 Thorn's Army was part of the winning alliance in the Texas Regional Championships, advancing to the Super-Regional championship in Atlanta, Georgia.

The Buinger Academy also is home to the L.D. Bell and Trinity drone teams, who have competed in an annual drone competition sponsored by Bell Helicopter since 2017. In the inaugural competition featuring just the two schools, Trinity defeated L.D. Bell. The competition was expanded to many other Tarrant County-area schools for the 2018 season, where Trinity again won at the 2018 competition.

==== Health sciences ====
The organization Future Medical Professionals is open to any HEB ISD student interested in going into medicine. HEB ISD also offers a clinical rotations program in conjunction with the nearby Texas Health Harris Methodist Hurst-Euless-Bedford Hospital that allows students to observe real medical procedures and potentially shadow doctors at the hospital.
