= Dimitri Nance =

American football player (born 1988)

No. 23
- Position: Running back

Personal information
- Born: February 18, 1988 (age 38); Bedford, Texas, U.S.
- Listed height: 5 ft 10 in (1.78 m)
- Listed weight: 219 lb (99 kg)

Career information
- High school: Trinity (Euless, Texas)
- College: Arizona State
- NFL draft: 2010: undrafted

Career history
- Atlanta Falcons (2010)*; Green Bay Packers (2010–2011); Atlanta Falcons (2012)*
- * Offseason or practice squad member only

Awards and highlights
- Super Bowl champion (XLV)

Career NFL statistics
- Rushing attempts: 36
- Rushing yards: 95
- Rushing average: 2.6
- Stats at Pro Football Reference

Dimitri Othello Nance (born February 18, 1988) is an American former professional football player who was a running back for the Green Bay Packers of the National Football League (NFL). He played college football for the Arizona State Sun Devils before being signed by the Atlanta Falcons as an undrafted free agent in 2010. He played high school football at Trinity High School in Euless, Texas.

Nance was also a member of the Green Bay Packers who he won Super Bowl XLV with, beating the Pittsburgh Steelers.

== Professional career ==
Nance was signed as an undrafted rookie free agent by the Falcons on April 26, 2010. He was then cut and signed to the practice squad on September 5.

On September 14, 2010, Nance was signed by the Packers. He was cut on September 3, 2011.

Season	Team	Games	Rush Att	Rush Yds	Long	Average	TD	Rec	Rec Yds	Long	Average	TD
2011	Green Bay Packers	12	36	95	11	2.6	0	3	30	14	10	0
