= KEYS High School =

School in Euless, Texas, United States

Location
- 1701 W Euless Blvd; Euless, Tarrant County, Texas 76040; United States; 32.8245274°N 97.1124054°W

Information
- Type: Co-educational, public, secondary
- Established: 1987
- School district: Hurst-Euless-Bedford Independent School District
- Principal: John Adkins
- Staff: 13.92 FTE
- Grades: 10-12
- Enrollment: 96 (2018-19)
- Student to teacher ratio: 6.90
- Colors: Purple and yellow
- Mascot: Phoenix
- Website: http://www.hebisd.edu/KEYS

KEYS High School, formerly known as KEYS Learning Center, is a public alternative high school in Euless, Texas, United States. It is part of the Hurst-Euless-Bedford Independent School District. KEYS primarily serves students ages 16 through 21 who are unable to remain at either L.D. Bell or Trinity high schools due to academic, economic, or personal needs. It offers the same curriculum as that of the District's regular high schools, but does not offer an athletic program, Advanced Placement, or International Baccalaureate classes.

== Campus ==
KEYS High School's building on Raider Drive was built in 1957 as the first campus for L.D. Bell High School. In 1965, L.D. Bell High School was moved to its current campus on Brown Trail in Hurst, a site donated to the District by its namesake Lawrence Dale Bell. Its former building became Central Junior High School. In the late 1980s, Central Junior High moved to a new building adjacent to its old building, which became KEYS High School.

In November 2023, voters approved an HEB ISD bond package that included plans to tear down the building used by KEYS and replace a current elementary school with a new building on this site. Then, the existing elementary school building will be refurbished for use by the KEYS High School program. In April 2026, KEYS moved into the Faye Beaulieu Family Support Center building.

== Student body ==
For the 2018-2019 school year, KEYS High School enrolled 91 students in grades 10 through 12. Ethnicities represented included Hispanic (35.2%), white (30.8%), African American (24.2%), Pacific Islander (3.3%), 2 or more races (3.3%), and Asian (3.3%). KEYS High School receives students from the entire Hurst-Euless-Bedford ISD attendance zone.

85.7% of students were designated by the Texas Education Agency as at risk of dropping out of high school, 67% of students were considered economically disadvantaged, and 5.5% had limited proficiency in English. The four-year graduation rate at KEYS is 76.7%, well below the state and district averages.
