= Ryan McBean =

American football player (born 1984)

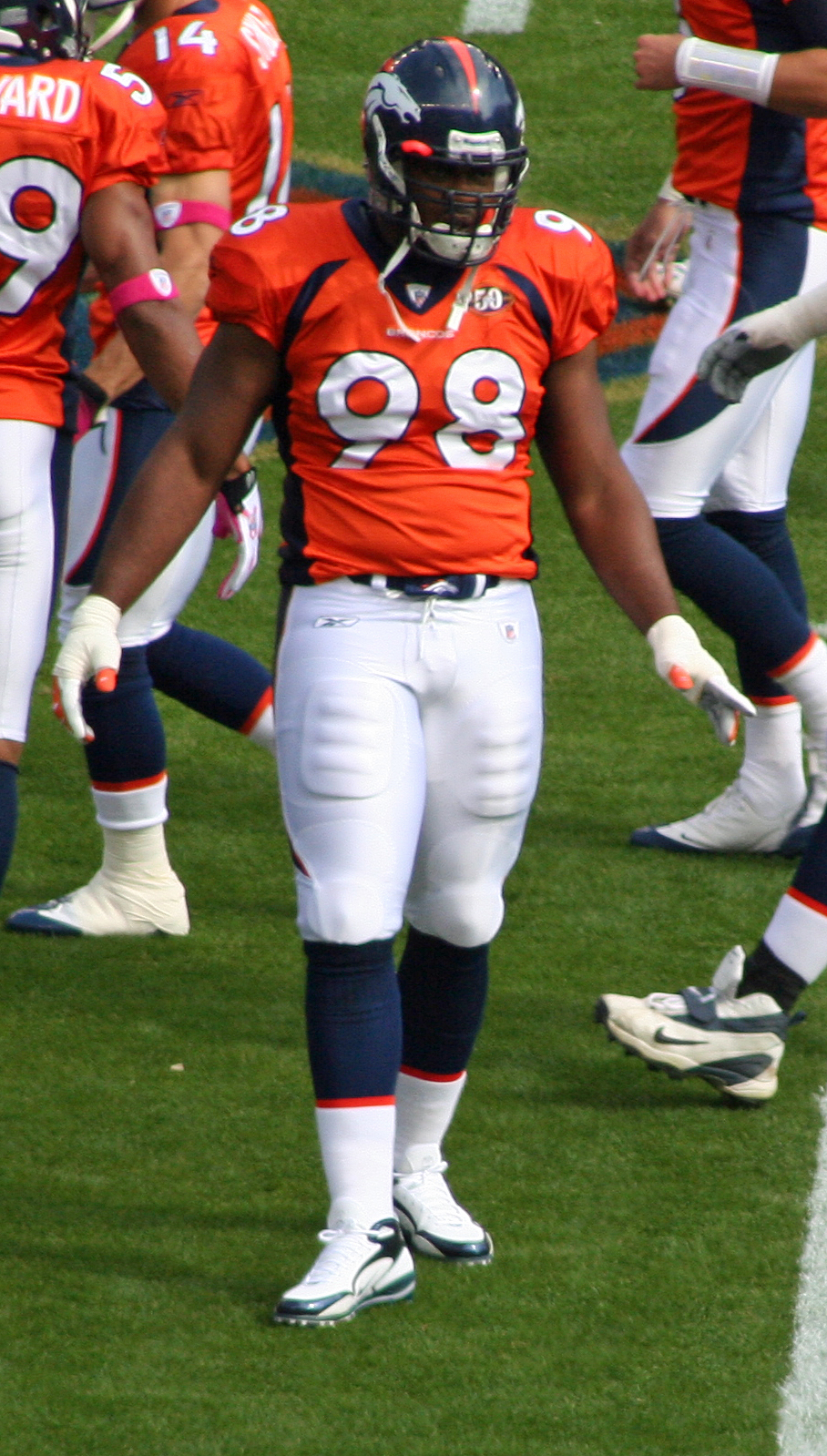
- McBean with the Denver Broncos in 2009

No. 95, 98
- Position: Defensive end

Personal information
- Born: April 23, 1984 (age 42); Kingston, Jamaica
- Listed height: 6 ft 5 in (1.96 m)
- Listed weight: 305 lb (138 kg)

Career information
- High school: Trinity (Euless, Texas, U.S.)
- College: Oklahoma State
- NFL draft: 2007: 4th round, 132nd overall pick

Career history
- Pittsburgh Steelers (2007); Denver Broncos (2008–2011); Baltimore Ravens (2012); Arizona Cardinals (2014)*
- * Offseason or practice squad member only

Awards and highlights
- Super Bowl champion (XLVII)

Career NFL statistics
- Total tackles: 77
- Sacks: 4.0
- Fumble recoveries: 1
- Stats at Pro Football Reference

Ryan McBean (born April 22, 1984) is a former American football defensive end. He was selected by the Pittsburgh Steelers in the fourth round of the 2007 NFL draft. He played college football at Oklahoma State.

McBean was also a member of the Denver Broncos, Baltimore Ravens and Arizona Cardinals.

== Early life ==
McBean graduated from Trinity High School (Euless, Texas) in 2003. There he earned first-team All-District honors after his senior season, Ryan was named the District Defensive Most Valuable Player, and received first-team All-District, The First Team Of the Decade, and All-Area honors from the Dallas Morning News.

== College career ==
McBean played at Hinds Community College in Mississippi for the 2003 and 2004 seasons before transferring to play college football at Oklahoma State in 2005 and 2006.

== Professional career ==
=== Pittsburgh Steelers ===
McBean was selected by the Pittsburgh Steelers in the fourth round (132nd overall) in the 2007 NFL draft. He made one appearance in his rookie season, and was cut from the team prior to the 2008 season.

=== Denver Broncos ===
McBean was signed to the practice squad of the Denver Broncos on September 1, 2008. He became a starter at the defensive end position for the 2009–2010 season under coach Josh McDaniels.

In March 2012, he was suspended for six games after failing a drug test.

=== Baltimore Ravens ===
McBean signed with the Baltimore Ravens on May 7, 2012.

=== Arizona Cardinals ===
McBean signed with the Arizona Cardinals on August 20, 2014. The Cardinals released McBean on August 27, 2014.
