= Sara Grace Wallerstedt =

American fashion model (born 1999)

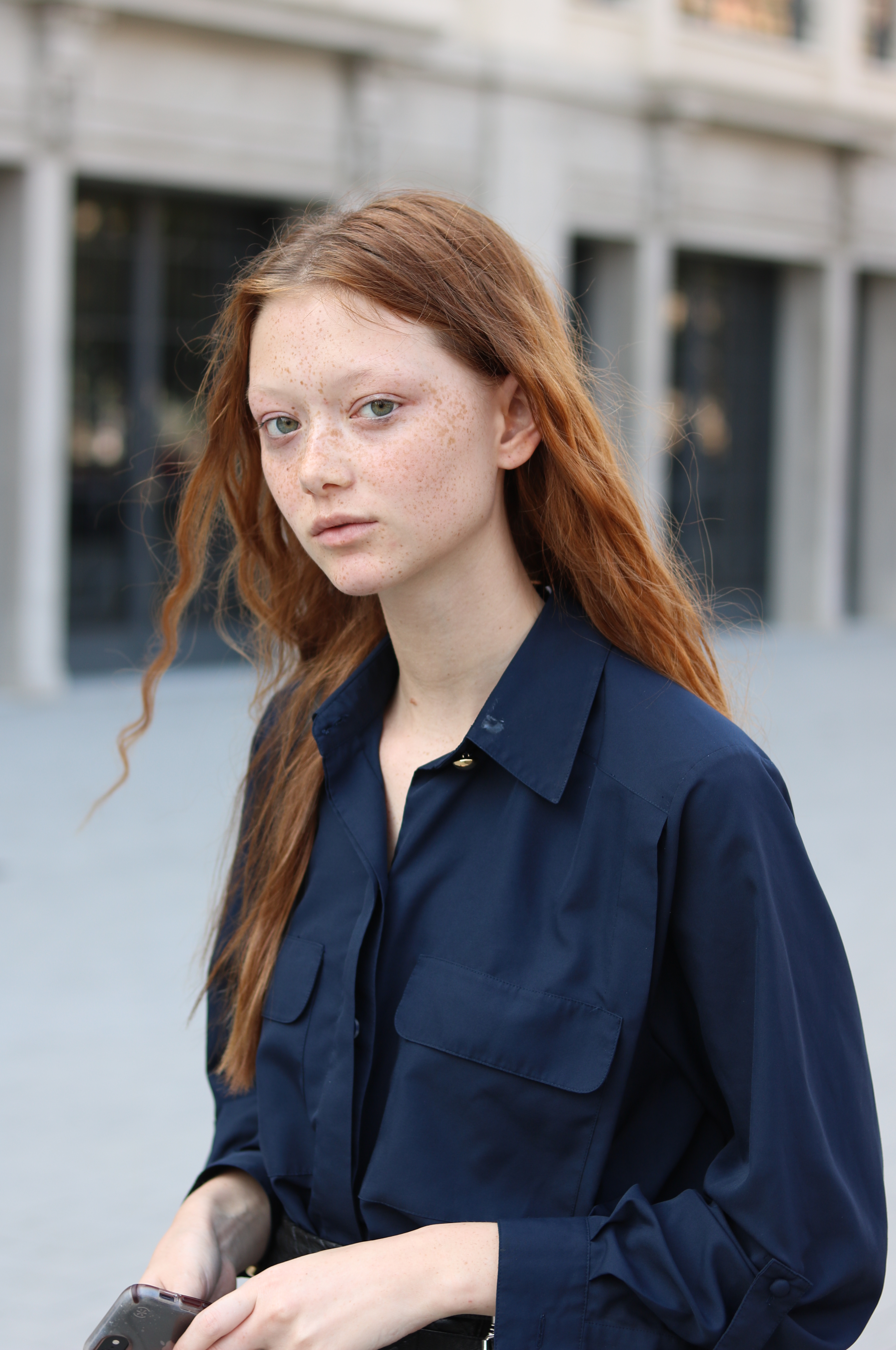
- Sara Grace Wallerstedt in 2018
- Born: Bedford, Texas, U.S.
- Modeling information
- Height: 1.76 m (5 ft 9 1/2 in)
- Hair color: Strawberry blonde
- Eye color: Blue-green
- Agency: The Society Management (New York); Elite Model Management (Paris, Milan, London, Barcelona, Copenhagen); Wallflower Management (Dallas)

Sara Grace Wallerstedt is an American fashion model. Her beauty has been described as "ethereal". As of March 2018, she was ranked on Models.com's Top 50 Models list.

== Early life ==
Sara Grace Wallerstedt was born in the Dallas suburb of Bedford to Darren and Karen Wallerstedt. She attended Trinity High School, where she played clarinet in the marching band, and she volunteered at the Euless Animal Shelter; before modeling, she hoped to become a veterinarian. She described herself as a "nerd" who didn't know what high fashion was, but she told The New York Times it was her way of getting out of Bedford, Texas.

== Career ==
Wallerstedt was signed at 16 after attending an open call at Wallflower Management, a Dallas-area modeling agency, and debuted as a Proenza Schouler exclusive at New York Fashion Week in September 2016. In 2017, she signed a year-long exclusive contract with Calvin Klein under its new creative director Raf Simons, walking only in the brand's shows and appearing only in its advertising until early 2018. In April 2017, she appeared on the cover of Vogue Italia and in Prada's spring advertising campaign, photographed on the California coast. She closed Prada's Fall/Winter 2017 show. She has walked the runway for Fendi, Burberry, Chanel, Tory Burch, Dior, Michael Kors, Louis Vuitton, Tom Ford, Salvatore Ferragamo, Versace, Valentino, and Anna Sui, among others. In the Fall/Winter 2018 season alone, she walked 26 shows, closing Simone Rocha's London show.

Wallerstedt has appeared in American Vogue, including a 2017 editorial photographed in her home state of Texas. She has also appeared in W and Harper's Bazaar.

In addition to Vogue Italia, she appeared on the May 2018 covers of Vogue Korea and Vogue China.

In 2020, Vogue documented her pre-show routine ahead of Missoni's Fall/Winter 2020 show in Milan. She has since appeared on the cover of Vogue Singapore's May 2024 "Escape" issue, photographed by Txema Yeste, and on Vogue Korea's June 2025 cover. In 2025, she appeared in a Swarovski advertising campaign.
