= Brandon Brooks (basketball) =

American basketball player (born 1987)

Personal information
- Born: June 28, 1987 (age 39) Dallas, Texas, U.S.
- Listed height: 6 ft 2 in (1.88 m)
- Listed weight: 190 lb (86 kg)

Career information
- High school: Trinity (Euless, Texas)
- College: North Lake College (2005–2007); Alabama State (2007–2009)
- NBA draft: 2009: undrafted
- Playing career: 2009–2013
- Position: Point guard
- Number: 10

Career history
- 2009–2010: Eisbären Bremerhaven
- 2010–2011: Tulsa 66ers
- 2011–2012: Phoenix Hagen
- 2012: Hapoel Kfar Saba
- 2013: Tulsa 66ers

Career highlights
- SWAC Player of the Year (2009); First-team All-SWAC (2009); AP Honorable Mention All-American (2009); NJCAA Division III national champion (2006)

Brandon Brooks (born June 28, 1987) is an American former professional basketball player.

== College ==
A native of Irving, Texas, Brooks attended Euless Trinity High School in Euless, Texas prior to enrolling at North Lake College as a freshman in 2005. He played junior college basketball for two seasons. In his first year, he played a supporting role as North Lake won the National Junior College Athletic Association (NJCAA) Division III national championship. Although the team did not repeat as national champions in 2006–07, Brooks had a starting role as their point guard. He drew the attention of Alabama State University head coach Lewis Jackson, and after his junior college career ended Brooks headed to ASU to play for the Hornets.

In 2007–08, Brooks' junior year, he played in 31 games and averaged 9.5 points, 4.2 rebounds and 6.1 assists per game. On March 8, 2008, in a game against Jackson State, he recorded a school record 20 assists. This total is tied for the third-highest single game total in NCAA Division I men's basketball history. By winning the Southwestern Athletic Conference (SWAC), they were able to participate in the 2008 NIT but would go on to lose in the first round. In his senior season in 2008–09, Brooks averaged 13.7 points, 4.2 rebounds and 6.2 assists per game. He was named the SWAC Player of the Year after guiding the Hornets to a berth in the 2009 NCAA Tournament. They participated in the "First Four" but lost their play-in game. Aside from being the conference player of the year, Brooks was also honored as an Associated Press honorable mention All-American.

== Professional ==
Brooks began his professional career after graduating from Alabama State in 2009. He spent his first season playing for Eisbären Bremerhaven in Germany's Basketball Bundesliga. He helped lead the team to the league's semifinals after playing in 44 games during the year, but he did not garner any personal accolades. Trying to get to the National Basketball Association (NBA), he then spent 2010–11 playing for the NBA Development League's Tulsa 66ers. The 66ers lost in the playoff semifinals as the Western Conference's fourth seed. After the year ended, Brooks headed back to Germany where he played for Phoenix Hagen. He signed with Israel's Hapoel Kfar Saba for the 2012–13 season before being released in December 2012. On March 23, 2013, the Tulsa 66ers acquired him for his second stint in Tulsa.

== See also ==
- List of NCAA Division I men's basketball players with 20 or more assists in a game
