= Myles Turner =

American basketball player (born 1996)

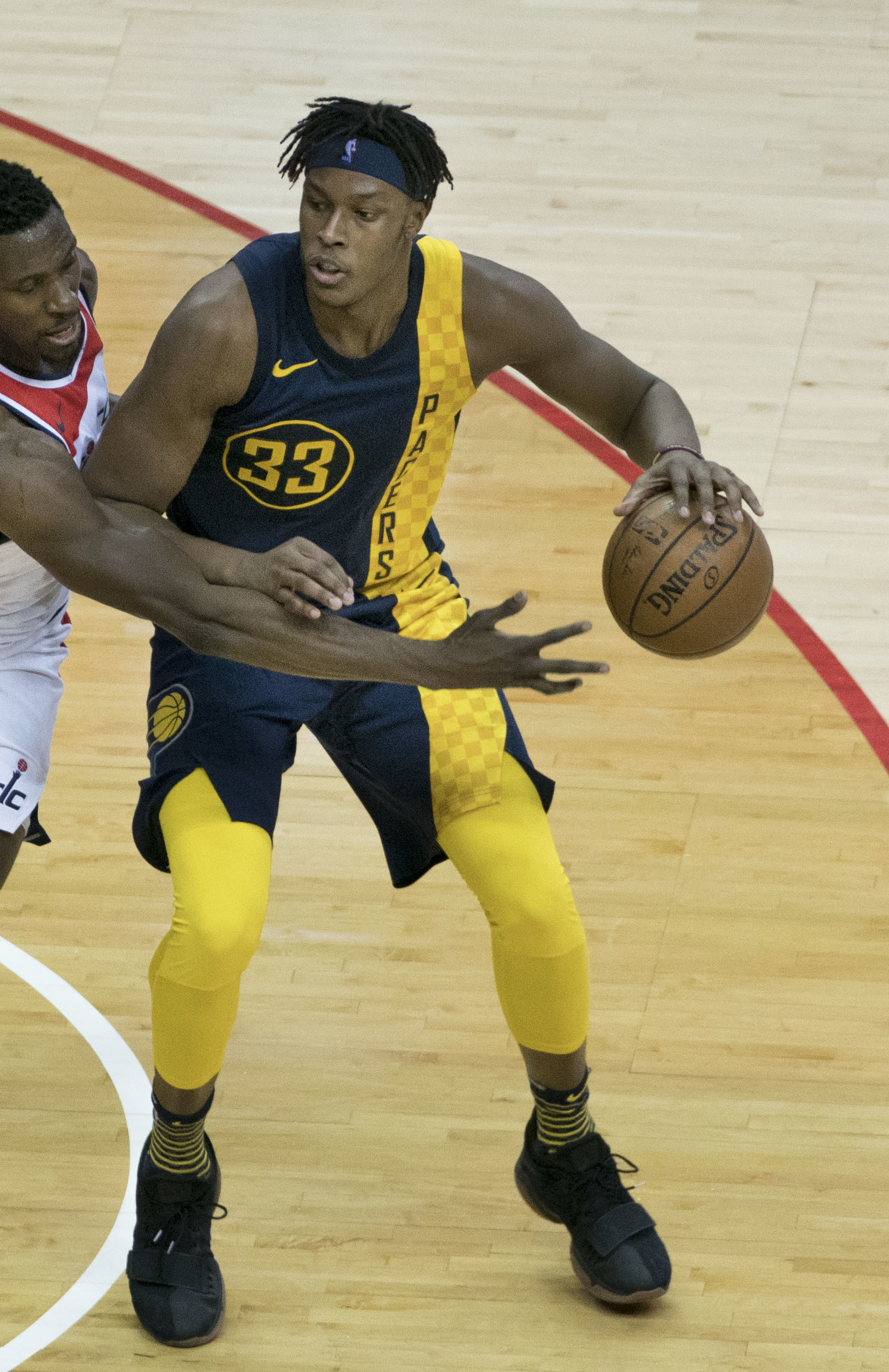
- Turner with the Indiana Pacers in 2018

No. 3 – Milwaukee Bucks
- Position: Center / power forward
- League: NBA

Personal information
- Born: March 24, 1996 (age 30) Bedford, Texas, U.S.
- Listed height: 6 ft 11 in (2.11 m)
- Listed weight: 250 lb (113 kg)

Career information
- High school: Trinity (Euless, Texas)
- College: Texas (2014–2015)
- NBA draft: 2015: 1st round, 11th overall pick
- Drafted by: Indiana Pacers
- Playing career: 2015–present

Career history
- 2015–2025: Indiana Pacers
- 2025–present: Milwaukee Bucks

Career highlights
- NBA All-Rookie Second Team (2016); 2× NBA blocks leader (2019, 2021); Third-team All-Big 12 (2015); Big 12 Freshman of the Year (2015); McDonald's All-American (2014); First-team Parade All-American (2014)
- Stats at NBA.com
- Stats at Basketball Reference
Medals
Men's basketball
Representing United States
FIBA Americas U18 Championship
Gold medal – first place	2014 Colorado Springs	National team

Myles Christian Turner (born March 24, 1996) is an American professional basketball player for the Milwaukee Bucks of the National Basketball Association (NBA). He played one season for the Texas Longhorns before being selected by the Indiana Pacers with the 11th overall pick in the 2015 NBA draft. Turner spent 10 seasons with the Pacers, reaching the 2025 NBA Finals in his final year with the team. Standing at 6 ft 11 in (2.11 m), Turner plays the center position. He has led the league in blocks twice in his career.

== Early life ==
Turner was born in Bedford, Texas, to parents David Turner and Mary Turner, and started playing basketball at age 6. He attended Central Junior High School, and as a 6-foot-2-inch (1.88 m) freshman, he led his team to 28 wins.

== High school career ==
Throughout high school, Turner played AAU basketball for the Texas Select team during the springs and summers to further develop himself and gain recognition as a player, participating in well known tournaments and camps such as the LeBron camp, the Nike Big Man Skills Academy, the NBPA Top 100 camp, Adidas Nations, and the Elite 24 invitational.

Between his sophomore and junior year, Turner, then 6'7", broke his ankle during the first spring game of AAU play, hurting his chances of recruitment, but soon recovered and gained some 30 pounds through two-a-day weight training regimen to improve his game.

In his junior year, after fully recovering, Turner averaged 15.7 points, 12.87 rebounds and 8.64 blocks per game, leading Trinity to a 17–13 record and reaching the state playoffs for the first time in 10 years, and only the ninth time in school history dating back to the school's establishment in 1968. He also accumulated six triple-doubles.

During the 2013 AAU summer circuit, Turner maintained his high level of production, leading his Texas Select team to the title at the 2013 Jayhawk Invitational in front of coaches from most of the Big 12 schools.

Going into his senior year, Turner began garnering nationwide attention and becoming a highly sought after recruit for his athleticism, ball handling, shooting ability, and natural shot blocking ability for someone of his height. He solidified that by finishing out his high school career with 18.1 points, 12.2 rebounds, 3.5 assists and 6.8 blocks per game, leading the Trojans to a 24–7 record.

After finishing off his senior year, Turner was one of the last highly sought after recruits left that were uncommitted. He was rated a five-star prospect by many sites including Rivals.com and several more college basketball analysts as well as being considered the No. 2 center in the nation behind Jahlil Okafor. Originally going into his senior year in fall of 2013, Turner had already accumulated 60 offers, but by his senior year, the list was narrowed down to Texas, Kansas, Duke, Arizona, Kentucky, Ohio State and Oklahoma State. On April 30, 2014, live on ESPNU's Recruiting Insider, Turner formally announced his commitment to play basketball for the University of Texas.

Turner took part in the 2014 McDonald's All-American Boys Game, in which he recorded seven points and seven rebounds. He also represented the United States in the 2014 FIBA Americas Under-18 Championship, helping the country win a gold medal.

College recruiting
Name	Hometown	School	Height	Weight	Commit date
Myles Turner; C	Bedford, Texas	Euless Trinity (TX)	6 ft 11 in (2.11 m)	235 lb (107 kg)	Apr 30, 2014
Myles Turner; C	Recruit ratings: Scout: Rivals: 247Sports: ESPN:				
Overall recruit ranking: Scout: 5, 3 (C) Rivals: 9 ESPN: 2, 1 (TX), 2 (C)
Note: In many cases, Scout, Rivals, 247Sports, On3, and ESPN may conflict in their listings of height and weight.; In these cases, the average was taken. ESPN grades are on a 100-point scale.; Sources: "Texas 2014 Basketball Commitments". Rivals.; "2014 Texas Basketball Commits". Scout.; "ESPN". ESPN.; "Scout.com Team Recruiting Rankings". Scout.; "2014 Team Ranking". Rivals.

== College career ==
As a freshman at Texas in 2014–15, Turner averaged 10.1 points, 6.5 rebounds and 2.6 blocks per game, earning 2015 Big 12 Freshman of the Year honors.

On March 30, 2015, Turner declared for the NBA draft, forgoing his final three years of college eligibility. In June 2015, Turner said, "The decision wasn't really that hard because I knew I would be picked pretty high, so I knew this was my opportunity to go."

== Professional career ==
=== Indiana Pacers (2015–2025) ===
Turner was selected by the Indiana Pacers with the 11th overall pick in the 2015 NBA draft. He missed 21 games between November 13 and December 28 of his rookie season after undergoing surgery to repair a fracture in his left thumb. On January 22, 2016, he scored a then career-high 31 points in a 122–110 loss to the Golden State Warriors. On March 3, he was named Eastern Conference Rookie of the Month for February after ranking third among East first-year players in scoring (13.4 ppg), rebounding (6.6 rpg) and minutes (29.8 mpg) during the month. On March 24, he recorded 24 points and a career-high 16 rebounds in a 92–84 win over the New Orleans Pelicans. Turner helped the Pacers reach to the playoffs as the seventh seed in the Eastern Conference with a 45–37 record, where they lost 4–3 to the Toronto Raptors in the first round. At the season's end, he earned NBA All-Rookie Second Team honors.

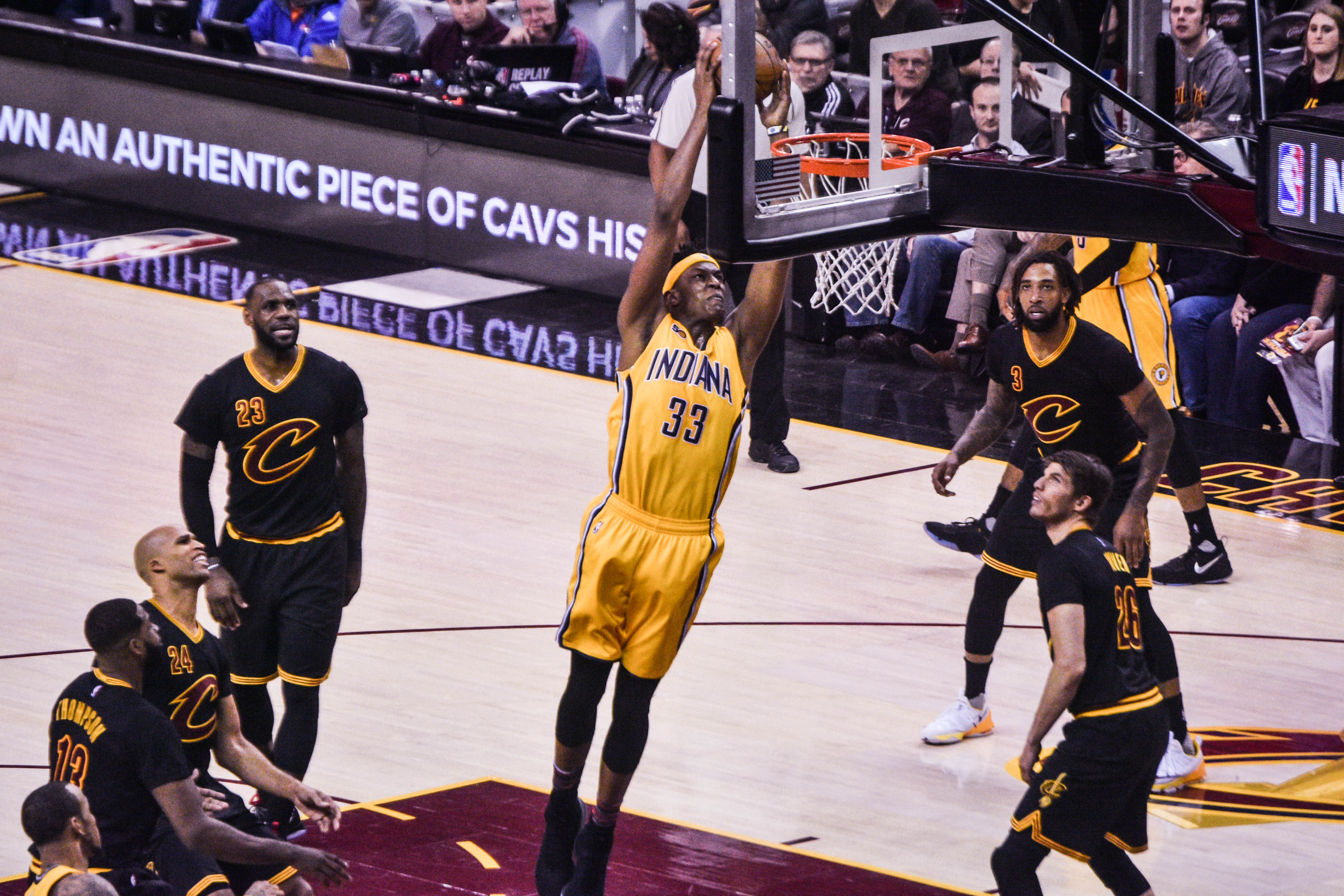
Turner dunking for the Pacers in 2017

In the Pacers' season opener on October 26, 2016, Turner recorded 30 points and a career-high-tying 16 rebounds in a 130–121 overtime win over the Dallas Mavericks. On December 15, he scored 26 points in a 102–95 loss to the New Orleans Pelicans. On March 26, he had 17 points and tied a career high with 16 rebounds in a 107–94 win over the Philadelphia 76ers.

Prior to the start of the 2017–18 season, Turner was elected team captain. In the Pacers' season opener on October 18, 2017, Turner had 21 points and 14 rebounds in a 140–131 win over the Brooklyn Nets. He missed the next eight games due to a concussion. On November 19, he scored a season-high 25 points against Miami Heat. Turner missed nine games in January with an injured right elbow. On March 13, he tied his season high with 25 points against the Philadelphia 76ers.

On October 15, 2018, Turner signed a four-year, $72 million contract extension with the Pacers. On October 29, in a 103–93 loss to the Portland Trail Blazers, Turner had three blocks to tie James Edwards (391) for number eight on the franchise's NBA career list. On December 10, he recorded a then season-high 26 points and 12 rebounds in a 109–101 win over the Washington Wizards. On December 23, he had 18 points and a career-high 17 rebounds in a 105–89 win over the Wizards. On March 5, he had a then career-high seven blocks in a 105–96 win over the Chicago Bulls. On March 18, he scored a season-high 28 points in a 106–98 loss to the Trail Blazers.

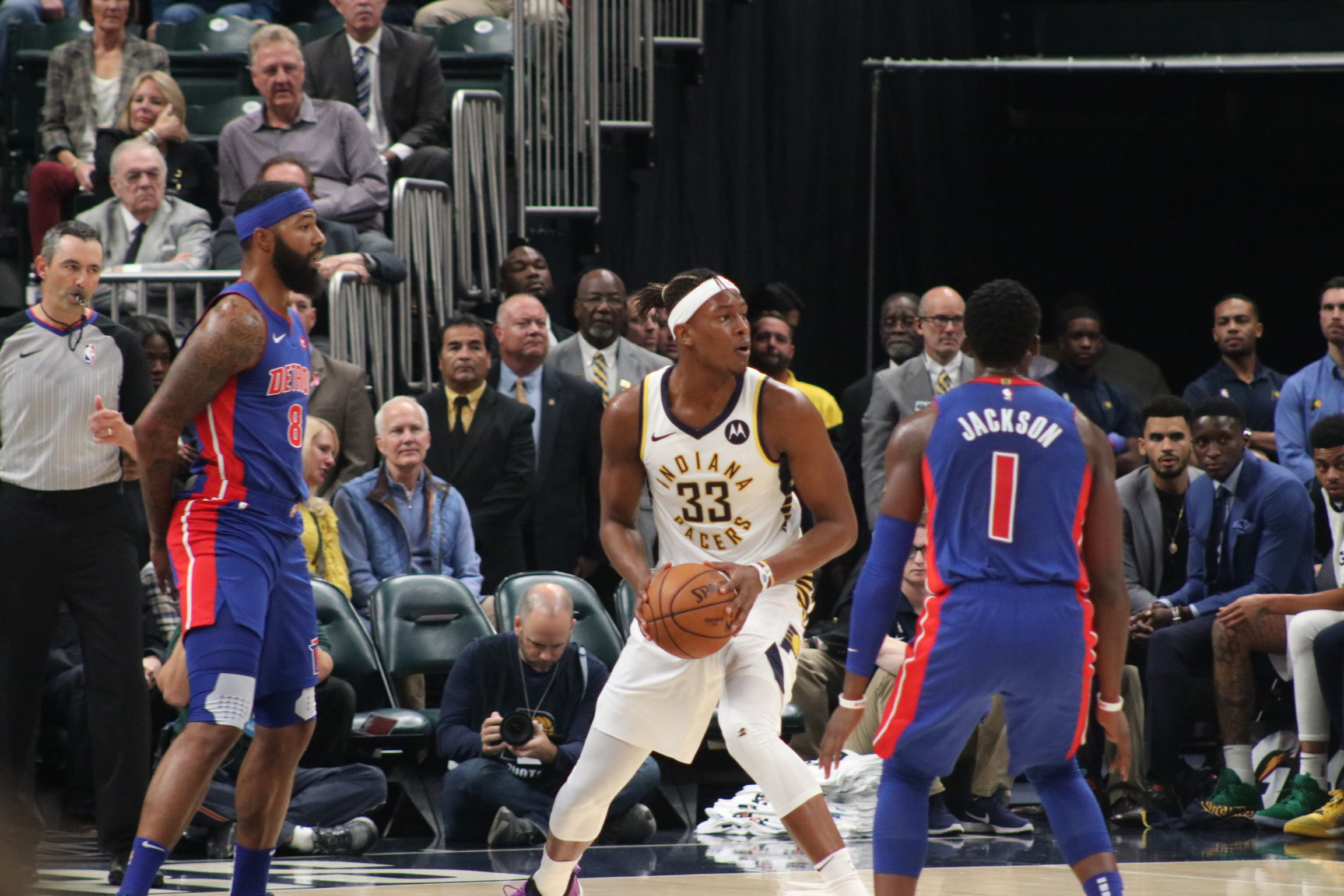
Turner (middle) looking to shoot against the Detroit Pistons, October 2019

On February 25, 2020, Turner recorded a career-high eight blocks in a 119–80 win over the Charlotte Hornets. On December 22, 2020, in the Pacers' season-opener, Turner matched a career-high eight blocks in a 121–107 win over the New York Knicks. On January 6, 2021, he recorded eight blocks again in a 114–107 win over the Houston Rockets. Turner finished the season with a league-leading 3.4 blocks per game.

On October 22, 2021, Turner recorded a career-high 40 points, along with five three-pointers, 10 rebounds, and three blocks in a 134–135 overtime loss to the Washington Wizards. On November 4, Turner scored 25 points while recording a career-high seven 3-pointers and grabbing 13 rebounds in a 111–98 victory against the New York Knicks. On January 28, 2022, he was ruled out for at least two weeks with a stress reaction in his left foot. On February 10, he was shut down through the All-Star break. On February 23, Turner was ruled out for multiple more weeks. On March 28, he was ruled out for the remainder of the season. He would have led the league in blocks had he played the necessary 58 games, and finished the season averaging 12.9 points, 7.1 rebounds, and 2.8 blocks per game in 42 games, while shooting 50.9 percent from the field and 33.3 percent from the three-point line.

On January 20, 2023, Turner signed a two-year, $43 million extension through the 2024–25 season, that also included a $17 million increase in his 2022–23 salary.

On February 23, 2023, Turner tied a career-high 40 points on a career-high eight three-pointers made and also put up 10 rebounds in a 142–138 overtime loss to the Boston Celtics.

On March 22, 2024, in a 123–111 win against the Golden State Warriors, Turner recorded five blocks en route to becoming the all-time blocks leader in Pacers franchise history with his 1,246th block, surpassing the previous record set by Jermaine O'Neal.

In Turner's final season with the Pacers, he helped the Pacers reach the 2025 NBA Finals, where they lost to the Oklahoma City Thunder in seven games.

=== Milwaukee Bucks (2025–present) ===
On July 7, 2025, Turner signed a four-year, $108.9 million contract with the Milwaukee Bucks. This ended Turner's 10 year union with the Pacers. In his Bucks debut on October 22, 2025, Turner put up 11 points, eight rebounds, five assists, and three blocks in a 133–120 win over the Washington Wizards.

== Career statistics ==
Legend
GP	Games played	GS	Games started	MPG	Minutes per game
FG%	Field goal percentage	3P%	3-point field goal percentage	FT%	Free throw percentage
RPG	Rebounds per game	APG	Assists per game	SPG	Steals per game
BPG	Blocks per game	PPG	Points per game	**Bold**	Career high
*	Led the league

=== NBA ===
==== Regular season ====
Year	Team	GP	GS	MPG	FG%	3P%	FT%	RPG	APG	SPG	BPG	PPG
2015–16	Indiana	60	30	22.8	.498	.214	.727	5.5	.7	.4	1.4	10.3
2016–17	Indiana	**81**	**81**	**31.4**	.511	.348	**.809**	7.3	1.3	**.9**	2.1	14.5
2017–18	Indiana	65	62	28.2	.479	.357	.777	6.4	1.3	.6	1.8	12.7
2018–19	Indiana	74	74	28.6	.487	.388	.736	7.2	**1.6**	.8	2.7*	13.3
2019–20	Indiana	62	62	29.4	.457	.344	.751	6.6	1.2	.7	2.1	12.1
2020–21	Indiana	47	47	31.0	.477	.335	.782	6.5	1.0	**.9**	**3.4***	12.6
2021–22	Indiana	42	42	29.4	.509	.333	.752	7.1	1.0	.7	2.8	12.9
2022–23	Indiana	62	62	29.4	**.548**	.373	.783	**7.5**	1.4	.6	2.3	**18.0**
2023–24	Indiana	77	77	27.0	.524	.358	.773	6.9	1.3	.5	1.9	17.1
2024–25	Indiana	72	72	30.2	.481	**.396**	.773	6.5	1.5	.8	2.0	15.6
2025–26	Milwaukee	71	71	26.9	.440	.383	.740	5.3	1.5	.7	1.6	11.9
Career		713	680	28.6	.494	.365	.769	6.6	1.3	.7	2.1	13.9

==== Playoffs ====
Year	Team	GP	GS	MPG	FG%	3P%	FT%	RPG	APG	SPG	BPG	PPG
2016	Indiana	7	4	28.2	.465	.000	.667	6.4	.4	.3	3.3	10.3
2017	Indiana	4	4	33.3	.432	.000	.625	6.8	.8	**1.8**	1.3	10.8
2018	Indiana	7	7	28.0	**.611**	**.462**	**.789**	5.1	.6	.3	.6	12.4
2019	Indiana	4	4	31.5	.400	.214	.615	6.3	1.5	.0	1.8	9.8
2020	Indiana	4	4	**36.4**	.568	.429	.438	**10.8**	.8	.5	**4.0**	15.8
2024	Indiana	17	17	32.4	.517	.453	.760	6.6	**2.1**	.5	1.5	**17.0**
2025	Indiana	**23***	**23***	29.3	.484	.344	.771	4.8	1.4	.5	2.0	13.8
Career		66	63	30.7	.500	.378	.725	6.0	1.3	.5	1.9	13.8

=== College ===
Year	Team	GP	GS	MPG	FG%	3P%	FT%	RPG	APG	SPG	BPG	PPG
2014–15	Texas	34	7	22.2	.455	.274	.839	6.5	.6	.3	2.6	10.1

== Personal life ==
During his own time, Turner enjoys building Lego sets and practicing yoga. Turner is a practicing Jehovah's Witness. Turner has an ongoing argument between him and rapper, Babytron. It stems from Turner losing a bet in 2022 that he would make the All Star game before Babytron would have a Billboard Top 10 single. This beef has led to Babytron dissing Turner on multiple occasions and dropping a diss track, Yaxel, on Turner

== See also ==
- List of NBA career blocks leaders
- List of NBA annual blocks leaders
