= Garth TenNapel =

American football player (born 1954)

No. 57, 56
- Position: Linebacker

Personal information
- Born: March 27, 1954 (age 72); Los Angeles, California, U.S.
- Listed height: 6 ft 1 in (1.85 m)
- Listed weight: 213 lb (97 kg)

Career information
- High school: Trinity (Euless, Texas)
- College: Texas A&M
- NFL draft: 1976: 7th round, 198th overall pick

Career history
- Detroit Lions (1976–1977); Atlanta Falcons (1978)

Awards and highlights
- First-team All-American (1975); First-team All-SWC (1975); Second-team All-SWC (1974)

Career NFL statistics
- Sacks: 2
- Fumble recoveries: 1
- Stats at Pro Football Reference

Garth TenNapel (born March 27, 1954) is an American former professional football player who was a linebacker in the National Football League (NFL). He played college football for the Texas A&M Aggies and was selected by the Detroit Lions in the seventh round of the 1976 NFL draft. TenNapel played in the NFL between 1976 and 1978. His career ended after his third NFL season when he suffered severe injuries in an automobile accident.

== Biography ==
TenNapel was born in Los Angeles on March 27, 1954. He attended Trinity High School in Euless, Texas. He then played football at Texas A&M University.

Early in the 1974 season, Associated Press sportswriter Herschel Nissenson wrote, "Remember the name Garth TenNapel. It's TenNapel, no space; not Ten Napel. Pretty soon it may be Garth Twenty-Tackle." TenNapel had recorded 20 tackles for Texas A&M in a game against Clemson University and again in an upset win over LSU the next week. He was designated Lineman of the Week by the Associated Press after the LSU game. He was named an All-American linebacker in 1975. He played in the Liberty Bowl that year against USC. TenNapel was later inducted into the Texas A&M Athletic Hall of Fame.

TenNapel was selected in the seventh round (198th overall) of the 1976 NFL draft by the Detroit Lions. He was battling to make the active roster that year when he returned a punt for a touchdown and returned an interception to the opposing three yard line in a preseason game against Baltimore. TenNapel played in 14 games for the Lions in 1976 and another 14 games in 1977. He was traded to the Falcons after the 1977 season.

On April 4, 1979, TenNapel and Falcons teammate Andy Spiva were involved in a car accident. It had been raining in Atlanta that day and Spiva's sports car collided with a tree. Spiva was killed and TenNapel was seriously injured. TenNapel was comatose for more than three weeks and lost more than 50 pounds after the accident. By August of that year, he had recovered sufficiently to begin working out at the Falcons football camp, where he expressed hopes of making a football comeback. In December 1979, TenNapel announced his retirement, saying that although he had improved, his speed had never returned during his rehabilitation.
