= Mike Baab =

American football player (born 1959)

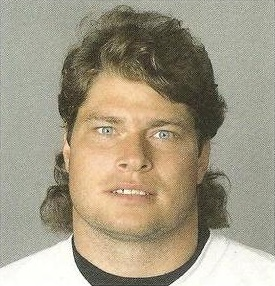

No. 61, 68, 60
- Position: Center

Personal information
- Born: December 6, 1959 (age 66); Fort Worth, Texas, U.S.
- Listed height: 6 ft 4 in (1.93 m)
- Listed weight: 270 lb (122 kg)

Career information
- High school: Trinity (Euless, Texas)
- College: Texas (1978-1981)
- NFL draft: 1982: 5th round, 115th overall pick

Career history
- Cleveland Browns (1982–1987); New England Patriots (1988–1989); Cleveland Browns (1990–1991); Kansas City Chiefs (1992)

Awards and highlights
- Third-team All-American (1981); All-Southwest Conference - (1981); Southwest Conference Champion - (1981); 1982 Cotton Bowl Champion; 1978 Sun Bowl Champion

Career NFL statistics
- Games played: 148
- Games started: 138
- Fumble recoveries: 2
- Stats at Pro Football Reference

Michael James Baab (/bæb/ BAB; born December 6, 1959) is an American former professional football player who was a center for 11 seasons in the National Football League (NFL), primarily with the Cleveland Browns. He played college football for the Texas Longhorns.

== Early life ==
Raised in Euless, Texas, Baab graduated from Trinity High School in 1978. Consensus All-State and All-American honors came his senior year of 1978.

In 1998, Baab was named to the Pepsi's All-Time UIL High School Football Team.

He was inducted into the Texas High School Sports Hall of Fame in 2016.

== College career ==
Baab played football at the University of Texas at Austin, lettering all four years from 1978 to 1981. In 1978, as a back-up guard, he helped the team to win the 1978 Sun Bowl and finish ranked #9. In his next two seasons he helped the Longhorns to play in the 1979 Sun Bowl and finish ranked #12 and the 1980 Astro-Bluebonnet Bowl. He was again a back-up guard in 1979, but in 1980 he became a starter playing both guard and center.

In 1981 he was voted team captain by his Longhorn teammates and he led them to a Southwest Conference Championship and an upset victory over #3 Alabama in the 1982 Cotton Bowl Classic after which the team finished the season ranked #2. For his efforts he received All-Southwest Conference and third-team All-American honors that year.

After his college career was over, he played in the 1982 Senior Bowl in Mobile, AL.

He was inducted into the Texas Hall of Honor in 2008.

== Professional career ==
Baab was selected by the Cleveland Browns in the 5th round of the 1982 NFL draft, the 115th overall pick. He played for the Browns from 1982 to 1987 and helped them to reach back to back AFC Championships in 1987 and 1988.

After the 1987–88 season he was traded to the New England Patriots for a 5th round draft choice in the 1989 draft (which Cleveland traded to Green Bay as part of a multi-pick deal to get Lawyer Tillman). He played with the Patriots for two seasons. He became a free agent and was re-signed by the Browns three times playing with them from 1990 to 1992 before being released by the Browns at the start of training came in 1992. He was signed by the Kansas City Chiefs late in the 1992 season, became a free agent after the season and was not resigned. He finished his career having played in 148 games, with 138 starts, 1 carry and 2 fumbles.

== Personal life ==
After retiring from football, Baab moved to the Scottish Highland Games for competition. He won the Masters World Championship in the 45-49 age class in 2005. Mike lives in Austin, Texas with his wife Lolis, his college sweetheart, and his two daughters, Micaela and Larissa. Both girls compete in Highland Athletics.
