= SystemsGo =

- Founded: 1996
- Founder: Brett Williams
- Type: 501(c)(3)
- Purpose: "To incorporate a problem-solving education philosophy into schools through project-based curriculum and teacher training."
- Location: Fredericksburg, Texas
- Region served: United States
- Members: 75 Member High Schools
- Key people: Phil Houseal, Scott Netherland, Rebekah Hyatt, Andrew Matthes, Christy Glass, Gene Garrett
- Website: systemsgo.org

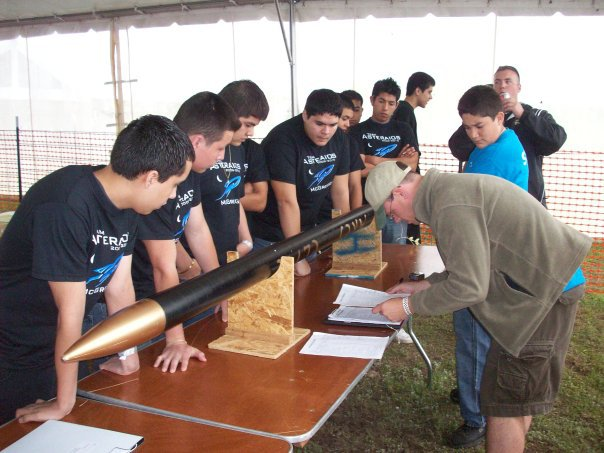
A team making last minute adjustments before launch

SystemsGo is a classroom program used in the United States promote the study of engineering and the development of work force skills. It is intended to encourage students to pursue careers in science, technology, engineering, and mechanics. It is based in Fredericksburg, Texas. It allows students to learn more about the past, present, and future of rocket technology, as well as use information learned from independent study to complete hands-on projects.

== Annual Rocket Meet ==
Every spring, teams from high schools in the US gather in at several sites to launch their semester project rockets. The program offers high school students three different levels of projects, ranging from a mid-sized rocket traveling to a one mile apogee to rockets weighing several hundred pounds with the potential to reach near-space altitudes.

== Program levels ==
Tsiolkovsky Level : The first stage of the Program, named after the Soviet rocket scientist Konstantin Tsiolkovsky, requires students to propel a research package to an altitude of 5,280 feet (one mile) and to recover it after launch.

Oberth Level : The intermediate stage, named after the German physicist Hermann Oberth, gives students the goal of designing and launching a rocket able to reach transonic velocity while maintaining a maximum altitude of less than 13,000 feet.

Goddard Level : The most advanced level, named after the American engineer and rocket scientist Robert H. Goddard, challenges students to create a rocket from scratch that can reach an altitude of 50,000 feet, which is considered to fall within the near space region of Earth’s atmosphere. Rockets for this level are often several hundred pounds and can reach velocities of Mach 3 or even Mach 4. Launches for this level are hosted by the US Army at the White Sands Missile Range, New Mexico.

== Recognition ==
The SystemsGo program has been recognized and supported by such organizations as SpaceX, Dow Chemical, Boeing, NASA, and The Space Foundation.
