= L. D. Bell High School =

School in Texas, United States

Coordinates: 32.842911°N 97.162727°W

Location
- 1601 Brown Trail; Hurst, Tarrant County, Texas 76054; United States

Information
- Type: Co-Educational, Public, Secondary
- Motto: We do not imitate, but are a model for others.
- Established: 1957
- School district: Hurst-Euless-Bedford Independent School District
- NCES School ID: 482406002663
- Principal: Randy Belcher
- Faculty: 144.66 (FTE)
- Grades: 10–12
- Enrollment: 2,370 (2023–2024)
- Student to teacher ratio: 16.38
- Colors: Blue, silver, white
- Mascot: Blue Raider
- Rival: Trinity High School
- Newspaper: Blueprint
- Website: ldbell.hebisd.edu

Lawrence Dale Bell High School (generally known as L.D. Bell High School and also known as Hurst Bell) is an American high school located in the cities of Hurst and Bedford, Texas and part of the Hurst-Euless-Bedford Independent School District. The school is named for Lawrence Dale Bell, the founder of nearby Bell Helicopter Textron, and was recognized as a National Blue Ribbon School for 1994–96.

L. D. Bell's marching band won the Bands of America Grand National Championship in 2007. The men's and women's gymnastics teams have won a combined total of 36 state championships since 1967.

== History ==
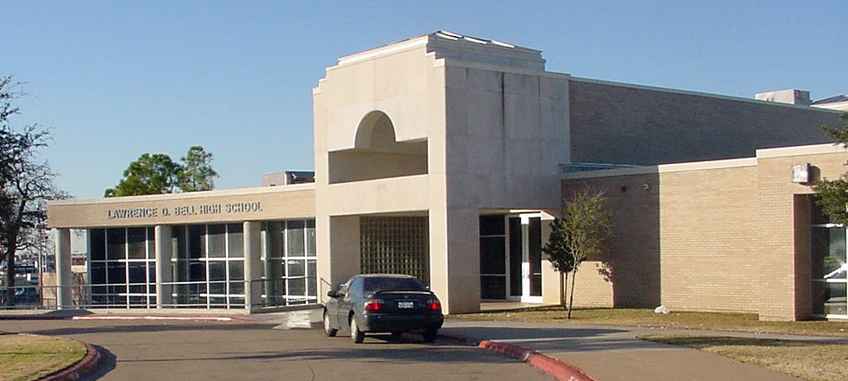
L.D. Bell High School Front Entrance

L.D. Bell High School opened in 1957 at a campus on Pipeline Road. Lawrence Dale Bell High School was relocated to the current campus on Brown Trail in 1965, at a site donated to the school district by Lawrence D. "Larry" Bell, Founder and President of Bell Helicopter Textron in Fort Worth. The new location was able to accommodate a growing student population resulting from the rapid suburban growth in Hurst, Euless, Bedford, and Colleyville. The former high school grounds now house Central Junior High, the H-E-B Athletic Complex, KEYS (Keeping Eligible Youth in School) High School, and the Forrest E. Watson (F.E.W.) Center.

Preceding Randy Belcher as principal was Jim Bannister, who was preceded by Jim Short. All three were preceded by the state legislature-commended E. Don Brown, a former president of both the National Association of Secondary School Principals (NASSP) and the Texas Association of Secondary School Principals (TASSP).

In 2002, the school was at the center of a national zero tolerance debate when an honor student was expelled for having a non-serrated bread knife in his truck-bed. A combination of federal, state, and school district rules led the Texas Education Agency to advise that the student must be expelled for one year. The superintendent then reduced the expulsion to "time served".

In November 2023, voters approved an HEB ISD bond package that included plans to replace L.D. Bell High School with a new building at the same campus.

== Campus and facilities ==
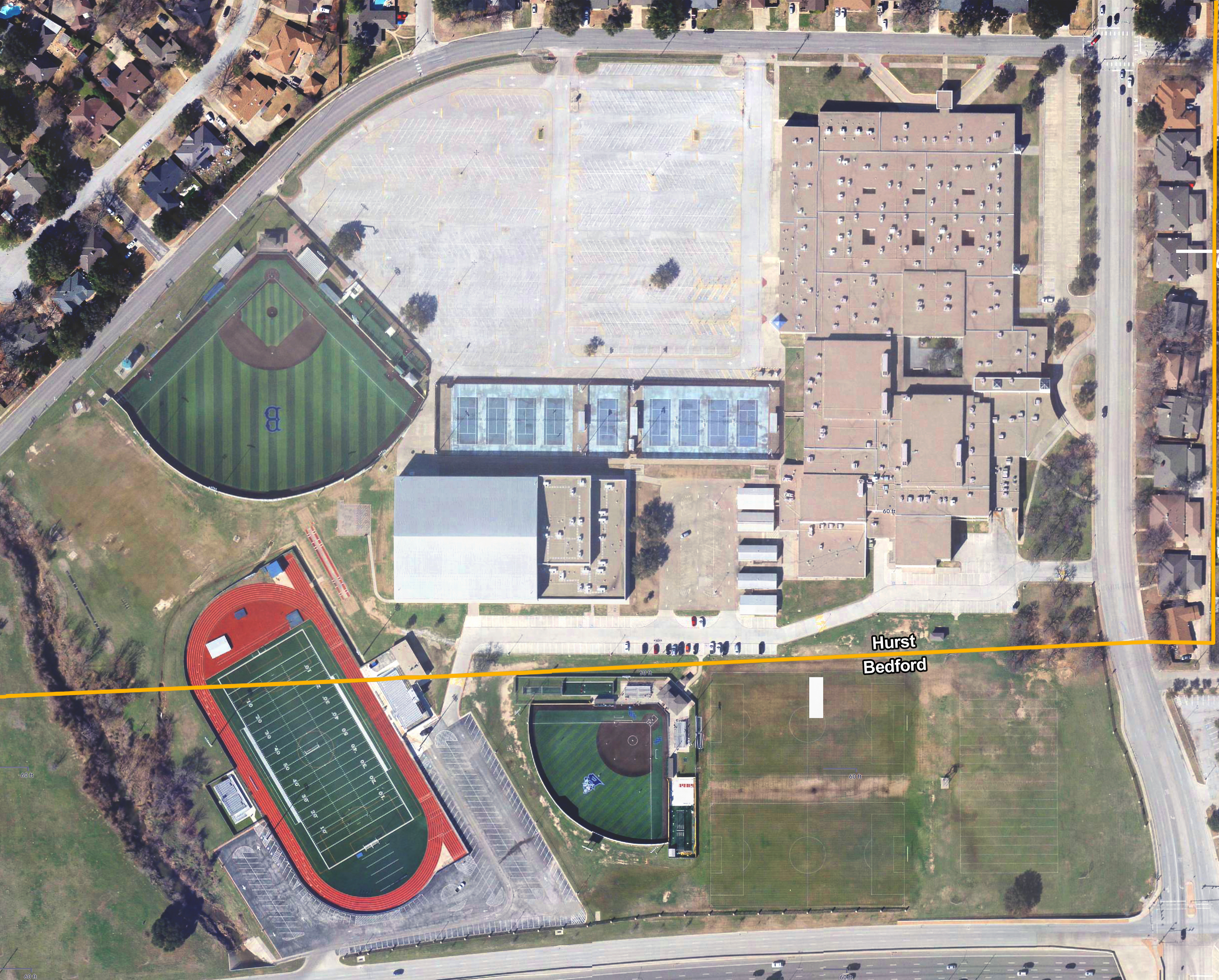
Aerial image of the main L.D. Bell High School campus circa 2022.

L. D. Bell High School moved to its present location in 1965. Venues on the L.D. Bell High School campus include Nathan F. Danford field (baseball); a softball field; the Raider Bowl - a football field with permanent bleachers, a track, a field house, and an observation deck; a practice football field for the marching band with an observation deck; several other large football fields; and four parking lots (faculty, student, band hall and Bell Freeway Entrance (B.F.E.) / Raider Bowl). An activity center named for former principal E. Don Brown opened in 2013 with a 60-yard indoor field, offices, and locker rooms.

The northern section of the campus grounds, including all buildings, is within the Hurst City limits. The softball diamond and most of the Raider Bowl and track are located within Bedford city limits.

L.D. Bell shares the use of district facilities such as Pennington Field for soccer, football, and marching band events and the HEB athletic field located at Central Junior High.

== Student body ==
During the 2014–2015 school year, L. D. Bell High School enrolled 2,143 total students in grade 10 (35.5%), grade 11 (32.5%), and grade 12 (32.0%). Ethnicities represented include white (49.5%), Hispanic (27.7%), Asian and Pacific Islander (6.7%), African American (13.3%), and Native American (0.6%). Forty percent were economically disadvantaged.

There were 600 graduates in the class of 2014. The annual dropout rate is 0.2% (in 2013–2014).

L.D. Bell receives students from three feeder schools: all students from Bedford Junior High school and Hurst Junior High school attend Bell along with a share of the students from Central Junior High school. Students in the attendance zones for Bedford Heights, Bellaire, Bell Manor, Donna Park, Harrison Lane, Hurst Hills, River Trails, Shady Brook, Shady Oaks, Stonegate, and Trinity Lakes elementary schools attend L. D. Bell High School.

L.D. Bell students carry on many traditions, including "head-banging" to the drumline during pep rallies and at football games, as well as Seniors storming the gym floor at the beginning of the fight song at the end of each pep rally.

== Academics ==
The district has offered the IB Diploma Programme and Pre-IB preparatory classes at L. D. Bell since fall 2002, graduating the first class of IB students in spring 2004. L.D. Bell students may study specialized or vocational topics—such as video production, automotive repair and service, culinary arts, computer aided drafting, and cosmetology—at the Gene A. Buinger Career and Technical Education Academy.

Among L.D. Bell's class of 2014, the average SAT score was 1514 (Texas state average was 1417), and the average ACT score was 22.3 (Texas state average was 20.6). In 2007, the school had 5 National Merit Finalists.

On The Washington Post's 2016 list of America's most challenging high schools, L.D. Bell High School is ranked 1039th out of approximately 22,000 public high schools, based on a ratio of 2.445 college-level exams taken per graduate. In 2007, Newsweek used similar criteria to rank L.D. Bell as 303rd in the nation (and 4th within Tarrant County).

Among Tarrant County high schools, Bell High School ranks eleventh (of forty-six) in average points above passing on the 11th grade TAKS test.

TAKS - Met Standard (Sum of All Grades Tested)
Subject	2005 School (10,11)	2006 School (10,11)	2006 District (all grades)	2006 State (all grades)
Reading/ELA	82%	94%	93%	87%
Mathematics	75%	81%	85%	75%
Science	72%	81%	80%	70%
Soc. Studies	93%	94%	94%	87%
All Tests	58%	71%	79%	67%

== Athletics ==
Despite not having freshmen on campus, the 9th graders at each feeder campus are technically eligible for varsity sports programs, and on rare occasion make the teams and participate with the high school attendees.

=== Football ===
The 1982/83 varsity football team had an undefeated season and playoffs, (beating Trinity twice), before being defeated in the state championship game by West Brook Senior High (Beaumont, TX).

=== Gymnastics ===
Men's Gymnastics State Championships: 1967, 1968, 1969, 1970, 1971, 1972, 1973, 1975, 1977, 1980, 1981, 1982, 1985, 1988, 1993, 2007.

The men's gymnastics team has won 16 state titles since it was founded in 1966. The Bell men's team won their sixteenth state title in 2007, their first title in 14 years.

Women's Gymnastics State Championships: 1967, 1968, 1970, 1976, 1978, 1980, 1981, 1982, 1983, 1984, 1986, 1987, 1988, 1993, 1999, 2002, 2003, 2004, 2005, 2016, 2018.

The women's gymnastics team has won 21 state championships since 1967. The team claimed state titles from 2002 to 2005.

=== Baseball ===
Men's baseball is played on campus at Nathan F. Danford field, located along Pleasantview Dr. on the northwest corner of campus. Former head coach Paul Gibson was named “Coach of the Year” in 1995, 1996, 1999, 2002, 2004, 2005, 2008, 2011 and 2018.

=== Ice Hockey ===
The ice hockey team plays at area ice rinks, including the Dr. Pepper Star's Centers in Euless, Grapevine, and Coppell.

=== Tennis ===
The school has a full complement of tennis courts located between the new Don Brown Activity Center and the parking lot at the rear of the school building. The Varsity team accepts 9th graders from the two Junior High Schools that feed L.D. Bell - Bedford Junior High and Hurst Junior High. The JV team also plays home and away games with select high schools.

=== Other ===
L.D. Bell High School also fields teams in volleyball, soccer, softball, golf and men's and women's basketball. The men's and women's soccer teams' home games are typically played at Pennington Field. Softball home games are played at the softball field on the south end of campus near the Raider Bowl.

== Fine Arts / UIL Competitive Organizations ==
=== Band ===
In addition to the University Interscholastic League (UIL) competitions, the band regularly competes in independent contests (usually run by schools) and Bands of America (BOA) contests at both the regional and national levels. In November 2007, the Bell marching band won the BOA Grand National Championship and additional awards for Outstanding Music Performance and Outstanding General Effect. In 2006, the marching band was awarded "Outstanding Musical Performance" and placed 2nd overall at the BOA Grand Nationals. In 2004, the band won the BOA St. Louis Super-Regional and captured all captions (specific categories of judgment - music, marching, and general effect). In other BOA Grand National competitions, the band placed 4th in 2001, 5th in 2003, 3rd in 2005, 2nd in 2006, 1st in 2007, 2nd in 2008, 2nd in 2009, 3rd in 2010, and 10th in 2013. Since 2000, the band has medaled at 22 BOA events and 4 of 4 times at the UIL State Marching Band Contest. From 1998 to 2013, the L.D. Bell Marching Band placed in the top 5 of every contest entered.

== Notable alumni ==
Notable alumni are listed in chronological order by graduation (or expected graduation) year.

Name	Distinction	Graduated
John T. Montford	Former Texas state senator (1983–96) and Texas Tech chancellor (1996–2007)	1961
Charlie Durkee	American football player with the New Orleans Saints	c. 1962
Bill Line	American football player with the Chicago Bears	c. 1966
Michael W. Young	Awarded the 2017 Nobel Prize in Physiology or Medicine	1967
James L. Haley	Author (Texas history and fiction)	1970
Karen Tandy	Administrator of U.S. Drug Enforcement Administration 2003	
Buddy Whittington	Guitarist and blues musician	1975
Ron Faurot	American football player with New York Jets	c. 1980
Lezlie Deane	Star of 976-EVIL, Girlfriend from Hell, and Freddy's Dead: The Final Nightmare, founding vocalist of Fem2Fem and Scary Cherry And The Bang Bangs	1982
Johnny Solinger	Lead vocalist of Skid Row (American band) from 1999 to 2015	1983
Cary Blanchard	NFL placekicker (1992–2000) with Jets, Colts, Redskins, Giants and Cardinals	1987
Adam Setliff	1996, 2000 Olympian; 1988 State 5A discus champion and state record holder	1988?
Tommy Maddox	UCLA and pro quarterback, 2002 NFL Comeback Player of the Year	1989
Dennis Allen	Former Head Coach of New Orleans Saints, former head coach of Oakland Raiders	1991
Eric Vance	NFL safety (1998–2002) for Buccaneers and Colts; went to Vanderbilt	1993
Mike Holloway	Survivor: Worlds Apart winner	1994
Ryan Roberts	MLB player with Boston Red Sox, made debut with Toronto in 2006	1999
3 of Hearts	Female country music trio	2000
Chase Holbrook	Football player at Southeastern Louisiana and New Mexico State; threw for over 11,000 career passing yards	2004
Marshall Henderson	College basketball player with Ole Miss Rebels	2009
Josh Mauro	American football player with the Arizona Cardinals	c. 2009
Kyle Bartsch	Baseball pitcher, formerly with the Kansas City Royals and San Diego Padres organizations	c. 2009
Kenneth Farrow	American football player with the Seattle Dragons	2010
Destiny Vélez	Miss Puerto Rico 2015; Miss America Finalist 2016; Miss Fort Worth 2014; Miss Trujillo Alto 2015; SWAC Bowling Championship Winner	2014

== Awards and recognitions ==
Year	Organization	Award
1982	Varsity Football	UIL 5A State Finalist (2nd place)
1986	Varsity Football	UIL 5A State Semifinalist
1994–1996	School	National Blue Ribbon School
1995	Theater	UIL One Act Play State Champion
2000	Marching Band	UIL 5A State Champions
2001	Marching Band	BOA Grand National Finalist (4th Place)
2002	Gymnastics-women's	State Champions
2002	Marching Band	UIL 5A State Finalist (2nd place)
2003	Gymnastics-women's	State Champions
2003	Marching Band	BOA Grand National Finalist (5th Place)
2004	Gymnastics-women's	State Champions
2004	Marching Band	UIL 5A State Champions
2005	Gymnastics-women's	5A State Champions
2007	Gymnastics (Men - Team)	State Champions (Team)
2007	Gymnastics (Men - Individual)	Individual High Bar State Champion
2007	Gymnastics (Men - Individual)	Individual Vault State Champion
2007	Marching Band	BOA Grand National Champion;
2008	Gymnastics (Men - Individual)	All-Around State Champion
2008	Gymnastics (Men - Individual)	Individual Floor and Parallel Bars State Champion
Gymnastics (Men-Individual)	Vault State Champion	
2010	Gymnastics (Men-Individual)	Floor, Parallel Bars and All Around State Champion
2010	Choral (Bell System Show Choir)	First Place Show Choir, Windy City Classic, Chicago
2010	Choral (A Cappella Choir)	Vocal Ensemble Grand Champions, Windy City Classic, Chicago
