= Pennington Field =

Multi-purpose stadium in Bedford, Texas

Coordinates: 32.832755°N 97.136374°W

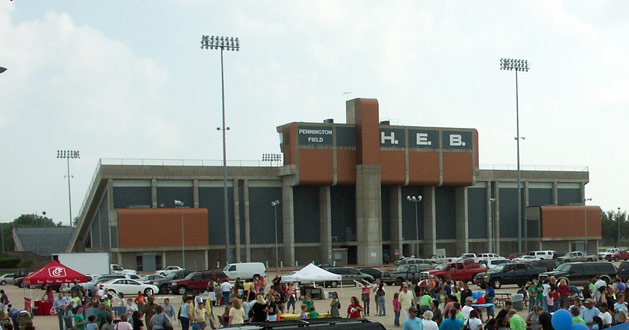
- Interactive map of Pennington Field
- Location: 1501 Central Dr., Bedford, TX, USA
- Owner: Hurst-Euless-Bedford Independent School District
- Operator: Hurst-Euless-Bedford Independent School District
- Capacity: 12,500 seats
- Surface: Hellas Matrix turf (artificial turf)

Construction
- Opened: Fall 1987
- Renovated: Fall 2003

Tenants
- L.D. Bell High School (UIL) (1987–present); Trinity High School (UIL) (1987–present); Lone Star Mustangs (WFA) (2008–present)

Pennington Field is a multi-purpose stadium located in Bedford, Texas. The 12,500-capacity facility is primarily used for local high school football and soccer teams of Trinity High School and L.D. Bell High School. It is owned and operated by the Hurst-Euless-Bedford Independent School District.

In addition to high school sports, Pennington Field was previously used by the DFW Tornados of the Premier Development League from 2004-2010, the American Eightman Football League (AEFL), and the Red River Bowl for NJCAA. In 2024, it was announced as a practice facility for the San Antonio Brahmas and Michigan Panthers of the UFL.

Pennington Field does not have a track around the field, partly because the city of Bedford has an ordinance requiring all tracks to be open to the public. The result is that the seats are closer to the sidelines, creating a more intimate spectator experience.

== History ==
The name "Pennington Field" was first given to an existing American football field near what was then L. D. Bell High School (now the site of Central Junior High). The field was named for Fred Pennington, the L.D. Bell High School football coach, after his accidental death in 1962.

The stadium opened in 1987 as a state-of-the-art venue that would host not only American football games, but soccer matches and special events as well. Pennington Field is still well known in the Dallas-Fort Worth Metroplex as one of the most advanced and high-quality high school sports stadiums in the area. In June 2010, the stadium's playing surface was replaced with a new Hellas Matrix turf. The artificial turf field is specially engineered to allow for proper drainage.
