= Bedford, Texas =

- City
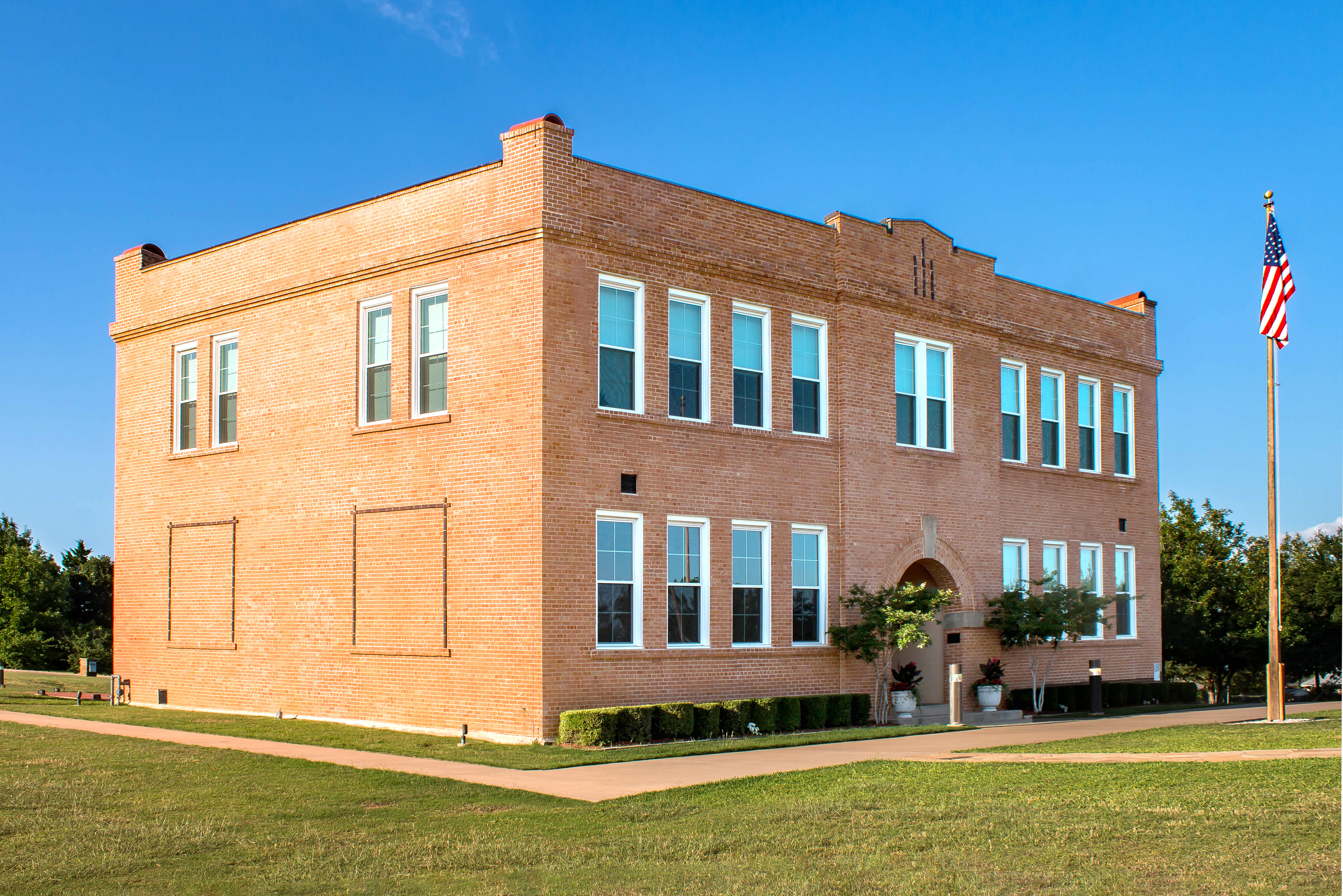
- Bedford School
- Interactive map of Bedford, Texas
- Location in Texas Bedford (the United States) Bedford (North America)
- Coordinates: 32°50′52″N 97°07′20″W
- Country: United States
- State: Texas
- County: Tarrant

Government
  - Type: Council-Manager

Area
  - Total: 10.04 sq mi (26.00 km^{2})
  - Land: 10.03 sq mi (25.98 km^{2})
  - Water: 0.012 sq mi (0.03 km^{2}) 0.10%
- Elevation: 600 ft (180 m)

Population (2020)
  - Total: 49,928
  - Density: 4,977.9/sq mi (1,921.96/km^{2})
- Time zone: UTC-6 (CST)
  - Summer (DST): UTC-5 (CDT)
- ZIP codes: 76021, 76022, 76095
- Area codes: 214, 469, 945, 972, 682, 817
- FIPS code: 48-07132
- GNIS feature ID: 2409810
- Website: bedfordtx.gov

Bedford is a city located in northeastern Tarrant County, Texas, United States, in the "Mid-Cities" area between Dallas and Fort Worth. It is a suburb of Dallas and Fort Worth. The population was 49,928 at the 2020 census. Bedford is part of the Hurst-Euless-Bedford Independent School District.

== Geography ==
- According to the United States Census Bureau, the city has a total area of 10.0 square miles (26 km^{2}), of which 0.10% is water.
- Neighboring cities include Hurst and Euless.
- Prominent highways include State Highway 121 and State Highway 183, also known as Airport Freeway (a reference to the Dallas/Fort Worth International Airport, so called because this was the main thoroughfare to the airport in the early years of its history).

== Demographics ==
Historical population
Census	Pop.	Note	%±
1960	2,706		—
1970	10,049		271.4%
1980	20,821		107.2%
1990	43,762		110.2%
2000	47,152		7.7%
2010	46,979		−0.4%
2020	49,928		6.3%
2024 (est.)	48,771		−2.3%
U.S. Decennial Census

As of the 2020 census, Bedford had a population of 49,928, 21,693 households, and 12,431 families residing in the city.

The median age was 40.1 years. 19.8% of residents were under the age of 18 and 18.9% of residents were 65 years of age or older. For every 100 females there were 90.8 males, and for every 100 females age 18 and over there were 86.4 males age 18 and over.

100.0% of residents lived in urban areas, while 0% lived in rural areas.

There were 21,693 households in Bedford, of which 26.3% had children under the age of 18 living in them. Of all households, 43.2% were married-couple households, 19.0% were households with a male householder and no spouse or partner present, and 31.6% were households with a female householder and no spouse or partner present. About 33.1% of all households were made up of individuals and 12.1% had someone living alone who was 65 years of age or older.

There were 22,863 housing units, of which 5.1% were vacant. Among occupied housing units, 53.5% were owner-occupied and 46.5% were renter-occupied. The homeowner vacancy rate was 1.1% and the rental vacancy rate was 7.7%.

Racial composition as of the 2020 census
Race	Percent
White	64.2%
Black or African American	11.7%
American Indian and Alaska Native	0.6%
Asian	5.3%
Native Hawaiian and Other Pacific Islander	0.8%
Some other race	5.0%
Two or more races	12.3%
Hispanic or Latino (of any race)	16.9%

Bedford racial composition as of 2020 (NH = Non-Hispanic) (Note: Note: the US Census treats Hispanic/Latino as an ethnic category. This table excludes Latinos from the racial categories and assigns them to a separate category. Hispanics/Latinos can be of any race.)
Race	Number	Percentage
White (NH)	29,991	60.07%
Black or African American (NH)	5,693	11.4%
Native American or Alaska Native (NH)	184	0.37%
Asian (NH)	2,626	5.26%
Pacific Islander (NH)	417	0.84%
Some Other Race (NH)	191	0.38%
Mixed/Multi-Racial (NH)	2,366	4.74%
Hispanic or Latino	8,460	16.94%
Total	49,928	

== Local government ==
- The City of Bedford, Texas Home Rule Charter was adopted September 24, 1966. The city operates under a Council-Manager form of government and provides the following services by its charter: public safety, public works, health, culture, recreation, community development, water and sewer utilities.
- According to the city's 2013–2014 Comprehensive Annual Financial Report, the city's various funds had $62.5 million in revenues, $56.9 million in expenditures, $127.4 million in total assets, $67.2 million in total liabilities, and $22.4 million in cash and investments.

=== Tax rollback of 2005 ===
- In 2004, the Bedford city council determined that after years of cost-cutting, a property tax increase would be necessary. The council adopted a higher tax rate, but it triggered a tax rollback election in March 2005. The rollback provision passed and the city council revised the budget immediately due to the lack of funds, cutting city services including swimming pools, recreational centers, and the city library. However, an anonymous donation of $300,000 allowed the reopening of the library, one pool, the recreational center, and senior center. Another $20,000 was raised through a resident fundraising drive to help reopen the library. City records show they had budget surpluses in the following years.

== Economy ==
=== Top employers ===
- According to Bedford's 2023 Annual Comprehensive Financial Report, the top employers in the city are:

#	Employer	# of Employees
1	Texas Health Resources	1,480
2	Carter BloodCare	961
3	HEB ISD	796
4	State National Companies	559
5	Walmart Supercenter	415
6	City of Bedford	357
7	Daystar Television Network	296
8	Bedford Wellness & Rehab	150
9	Kroger Foods	101
10	LINQ Transportation & Logistics	90

== Education ==
- Bedford is within the Hurst-Euless-Bedford Independent School District. School district facilities in Bedford include Pennington Field stadium, Gene A. Buinger Career and Technical Education Academy, two junior high schools, six elementary schools, and administrative offices. High School Students are also served by L.D. Bell High School in Hurst and Trinity High School or KEYS High School in Euless.

== Notable people ==
- Cayden Boyd, actor
- Scott Chandler, football player
- Colt David, football player
- Evah Destruction, drag queen
- Clint Ford, American actor and writer
- Donnie Hart, MLB pitcher
- Courtney Kupets, Olympic gymnast
- R. K. Milholland, author of the webcomic Something Positive
- Kyler Murray, Quarterback for the Minnesota Vikings
- Betty Pariso, IFBB professional bodybuilder
- Splurge, rapper
- Jonathan Stickland, Republican member of the Texas House of Representatives from District 92
- Blake Swihart, baseball player
- Myles Turner, NBA basketball player for the Milwaukee Bucks
- Daniel Woolard, professional soccer player
- Dustin Ybarra, stand-up comedian and actor
