= Hurst-Euless-Bedford Independent School District =

School district in Texas, United States

Hurst-Euless-Bedford Independent School

Location
- 1849 Central Drive, Bedford, Texas 76022 United States of America

District information
- Type: Public
- Motto: Empowering Today to Excel Tomorrow
- Grades: Pre-K through 12
- Established: 1958
- Superintendent: Joe Harrington
- Governing agency: Texas Education Agency
- Budget: $213 million (2021–22)
- NCES District ID: 4824060

Students and staff
- Students: 22,780
- Teachers: 1,337.5
- Staff: 2,511.1

Other information
- Website: www.hebisd.edu

Hurst-Euless-Bedford Independent School District (HEB ISD) is a K-12 public school district based in Bedford, Texas (USA). The district serves the city of Bedford, most of the cities of Euless and Hurst, and small parts of North Richland Hills, Colleyville, Fort Worth, and Arlington. The district operates twenty-one elementary schools, five junior high schools, two traditional high schools, and additional specialized facilities.

HEB ISD offers "Schools of Choice" programs, which provide unique opportunities for students to develop skills beyond standard primary and secondary school curriculum. The district was named by Education Resource Group in 2008–2011 as the top district in the state and has been recognized for achievements in academics and student performance, music education, public relations practices, operating efficiency, and teacher salaries. In August 2018, HEB ISD was rated "A" by the Texas Education Agency, placing it in the top quintile of Texas school districts.

== History ==
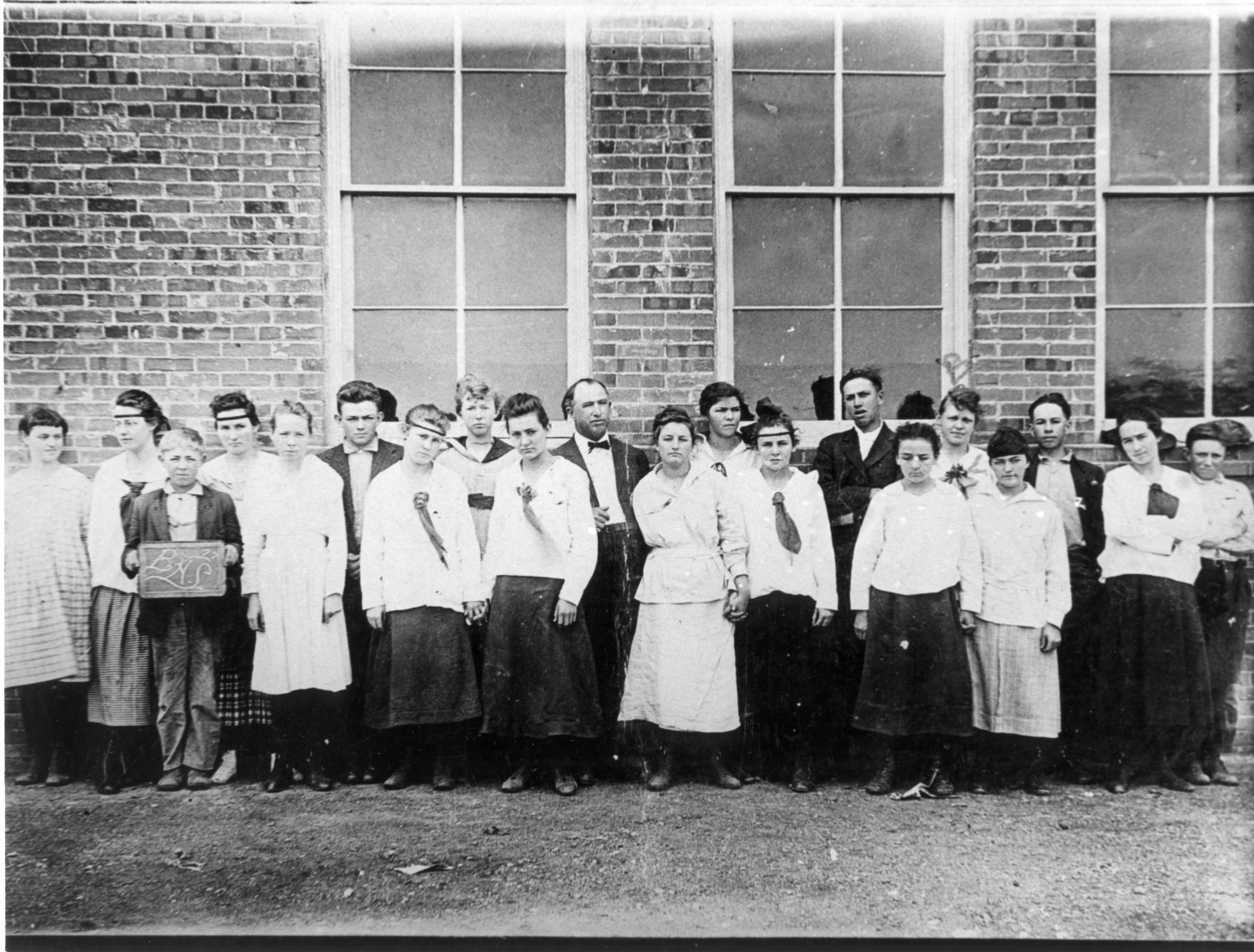
Bedford School class (1917)

Before the creation of the Hurst-Euless-Bedford school district, many schools and school districts served the area's education needs. Notable early schools included:

- Bedford College (1882–1893) A private combined high school and junior college that attracted students from out of state. The quality of education dwindled and became more like a public elementary and secondary school before it burned down in 1893 amidst rumors of arson.
- Bedford School (1912-current) This two-story brick building was restored after a fire in January 1991 and houses the Bedford School Museum. The school is also commonly known as the Old Bedford School.
- Euless School (1913–1970) Another two-story brick schoolhouse, the cornerstone was laid for Euless School in 1913 (on the site of present-day South Euless Elementary). Beginning in 1934 the school served as a high school, until 1955 when a new high school was built and Euless School was renamed South Euless Elementary. In 1970, the original building was demolished and replaced by the current building. In 2010, a historical marker was placed at South Euless Elementary.
- Mosier Valley School (1883–1968) In 1949–1950, a local crisis centered on Mosier Valley School, as parents and school employees struggled against state law requiring racial segregation. Mosier Valley School was organized in 1883 as part of Evatt School District and met in buildings shared with Oak Grove Baptist Church. In 1918, the school moved into its own schoolhouse. The school was closed in 1949; the wooden frame building was in poor condition and still had no heating, lighting, or sanitary facilities. In June 1950, a federal judge ordered the Euless School District to provide a separate school for African American children. To comply, the district temporarily re-opened Mosier Valley School. By September 1951, classes were moved into a new brick building. In 1968, the Mosier Valley school was closed when students integrated into other district schools. In 1984, a historical marker was dedicated at the original location of the school. The original wooden school house was moved to Bedford in May 1984. In 2014, the city of Fort Worth acquired the site of the school for the future creation of a city park.

=== Combined districts ===
The Euless and Hurst school districts merged in 1955. The combined district served 1,418 students and grew to almost 2,300 students in the next two years. In 1955, Lawrence D. Bell High School also known as L.D. Bell was founded.

In 1958, the residents of the Bedford School District voted to merge with the Hurst-Euless School District by 212 to 189. (Similar attempts to combine the cities themselves have not succeeded.) The tri-city district served 3,116 students during its first year, including 68 high school seniors, at seven schools:

- Bell High School (at the current site of Central Junior High)
- Bedford Elementary (the afore-mentioned Bedford School, now City of Bedford property)
- South Hurst (no longer district property)
- North Hurst (now Hurst Junior High)
- Mosier Valley Elementary (now a community building)
- Euless Elementary (now South Euless Elementary)
- West Elementary (now West Hurst Elementary).

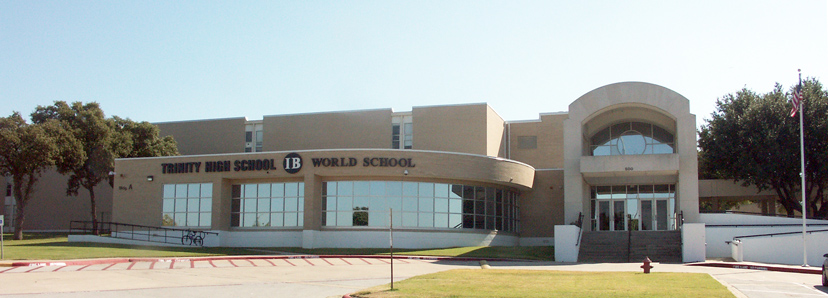
Trinity High School

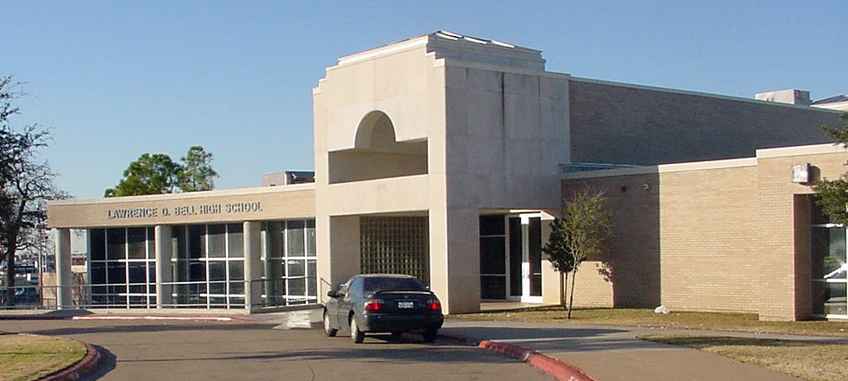
L. D. Bell High School

Later that school year, North Euless Elementary opened and Pennington Field was completed. The next decade brought Oakwood Terrace Elementary (1962) Wilshire Elementary (1964), the current L.D. Bell High School campus (1965), Donna Park Elementary (1966), Midway Park Elementary (1967), Bell's Driver's Education Facility (1968), and in 1969 Trinity High School, Bell Manor Elementary and Hurst Hills Elementary. Racial integration began in the summer of 1965 in a Head Start class. HEB ISD desegregated in 1968.

=== Events since 1997 ===
In 1997, voters approved a municipal bond of $170 million, the largest bond package that the district had ever proposed. The package included nearly $50 million for technology alone, allowed major renovations at nearly all campuses, and funded the construction of the Pat May Center administration building. The District called River Trails Elementary (opened August 2002) a "bonus" from the bond; the school's $7.5 million construction was paid for entirely by interest and investment of the bond fund.

HEB ISD's grade configuration of elementary (K-6), junior high (7–9), and high school (10–12) differs from the most common alignment among school districts in Texas (K–5, 6–8, 9–12). In September 2006, a task force of parents, teachers, and other district staff was created to study 10 possible grade configurations in anticipation of future growth. Their scientific opinion poll found that 80% of parents were either very satisfied or satisfied with the district's configuration; however, 68% of parents would support a district decision to change the configuration if the district believed it was best for students. On June 19, 2007, the board of trustees unanimously approved the Grade Alignment Task Force's recommendation to keep the established grade configuration.

During the 2006–2007 school year, fifth-grade students at Bellaire, Midway Park, Shady Brook, Bell Manor, Shady Oaks, and Wilshire elementary schools participated in the pilot of a ballroom dance program called "Dancing Classrooms". A survey conducted by the University of Texas at Arlington kinesiology program and the comments of staff at the elementary schools indicate that students who participated in the program experienced major improvements in self-esteem and social skills. The following school year, the District began to offer Dancing Classrooms during physical education classes at all elementary schools. HEB ISD and nearby Fort Worth Independent School District were among eight cities in the nation that offered the program, begun by Pierre Dulaine in New York City and made famous in the movies Mad Hot Ballroom and Take the Lead. Due to cuts in funding from the state, the Dancing Classrooms program was discontinued after the 2010–2011 school year.

On May 14, 2011, voters approved two bond proposals for a total of $136.5 million. Proposition 1 outlined $112.8 million for building repairs, classroom technology upgrades, and relocation of two buildings due to expansion of Texas State Highway 183. Proposition 2 allowed for the construction of activity centers to house extracurricular programs at L.D. Bell and Trinity High Schools, and for renovations to re-purpose the spaces those extracurricular programs were using, at a cost of $23.7 million.

In August 2014, the Hurst-Euless-Bedford ISD opened Viridian Elementary in north Arlington and the Gene A. Buinger Career and Technical Education Academy, replacing the Technical Education Center.

In a May 2018 election, more than 71% of voters approved a $199 million bond issue that focused on accommodating continuing growth in the school district. The proposal's plans included building two new elementary schools, repurposing an existing elementary school, expanding junior high schools, and upgrading technology infrastructure.

Voters approved both bond propositions on the ballot in November 2023, for a combined total of $997.3 million. Funds from the largest bond package in the school district's history will be used to completely replace aging buildings, including L.D. Bell and Trinity High Schools and four elementary schools, and fund smaller projects supporting KEYS High School, technology, and school safety.

== Students ==
=== Academics ===
STAAR - Percent at Level II Satisfactory Standard or Above (Sum of All Grades Tested)
Subject	HEB ISD	Region 11	State of Texas
Reading/ELA	84%	76%	73%
Mathematics	85%	78%	76%
Writing	80%	72%	69%
Science	88%	81%	79%
Soc. Studies	89%	80%	77%
All Tests	85%	77%	75%

Students in Hurst-Euless-Bedford ISD typically outperform local region and statewide averages on standardized tests. In 2015–2016 State of Texas Assessments of Academic Readiness (STAAR) results, 85% of students in HEB ISD met Level II Satisfactory standards, compared with 77% in Region 11 and 75% in the state of Texas. The average SAT score of the class of 2015 was 1488, and the average ACT score was 22.2. In 2016, 23 high school juniors were recognized through the National Merit Scholarship Program and the National Hispanic Recognition Program based on PSAT/NMSQT scores. In 2017 and 2018, HEB ISD was among the 5% of school systems that received Texas Education Agency's post-secondary readiness distinction.

=== Demographics ===
In the 2015–2016 school year, the school district had a total of 22,780 students, ranging from early childhood education and pre-kindergarten through grade 12. The class of 2015 included 1,469 graduates; the annual drop-out rate across grades 9–12 was less than 1%.

HEB ISD has been recognized as the second most diverse school district in Texas and the 18th (of 7,719 total) most diverse school district in the country. As of the 2015–2016 school year, the ethnic distribution of the school district was 39.2% White, 29.3% Hispanic, 18.3% African American, 6.9% Asian, 2.3% Pacific Islander, 0.5% American Indian, and 3.4% from two or more races. Economically disadvantaged students made up 52.8% of the student body.

== Curriculum and "Schools of Choice" Programs ==
Curriculum programs offered are generally uniform throughout district schools. Core classes are supplemented by "Schools of Choice" or "Edge" programs, which focus on providing unique opportunities for students to develop their skills to compete in the global job market. These internationally oriented electives have been recognized for the unique opportunities they offer to students. "Schools of Choice" programs accept applications from students who live outside of Hurst-Euless-Bedford ISD's boundaries; residents of the HEB area are given first priority. Students who are not residents must provide transportation and, for elementary programs, pay tuition.

=== University-level courses ===
The District has offered the International Baccalaureate (IB) diploma program at both its high schools since fall 2002, graduating the first class of IB students in spring 2004. The program is the highest academic curriculum offered; students study six subjects in college-level classes that culminate in comprehensive exams or artistic portfolio assessments. HEB ISD was the first district in Tarrant County to offer the program and is the only multi-high school district in Texas where all high schools have an IB program. In 2012, students in HEB ISD had a passing rate of 83% on IB exams, higher than the US national passing rate (66.9%) and the global passing rate (78.4%).

Advanced Placement (AP) classes are offered at both high school campuses, with a Pre-AP curriculum available at the junior high and elementary school levels. Students in AP courses, like IB, complete college-level work throughout the year and take tests in May; many universities will award college credit for high enough test scores. Each student in an AP class is required to take a qualifying exam, and if the student meets the standard in that subject, the district pays the test fee.

=== Language and cultural study ===
Beginning in the 2007–2008 school year, Hindi and Mandarin Chinese language classes are offered at Central Junior High. HEB ISD was the second school district in the nation to offer Hindi, and the first in Northeast Tarrant County to offer Mandarin Chinese. Starting in the 2011–2012 school year, the program was expanded to include Arabic language classes. Viridian Elementary began an elementary world languages program in 2014, allowing HEB ISD students to complete an aligned course of Arabic, Hindi, or Mandarin Chinese study from first grade through high school graduation.

Spanish Immersion is offered to English-speaking students entering first grade at Bedford Heights and Meadow Creek elementary schools with the goal of fluency in Spanish by completion of sixth grade. Classes attended by participants in the program – including math, science, and social studies – are taught in Spanish; English is studied and read at home. Students continue in the program throughout elementary school, and in the 2007–2008 school year, the first Spanish Immersion class continued their studies in seventh grade.

=== Career and technical education ===
The district has offered automotive technician training programs since 1971. In 2006, the program received certification from the National Automotive Technicians Education Foundation for brake repair, electrical electronic systems, engine performance, and suspension and steering. The Automotive Collision Repair program has also been certified in Non-Structural Analysis/Damage Repair and Painting and Refinishing. These certifications are awarded after on-site evaluations of instruction, facilities, and equipment and are recognized by the National Institute for Automotive Service Excellence. On May 10, 2009, the Automotive Collision Repair program's first entry in the Houston Art Car Parade won the parade's People's Choice Award, one of three grand trophies that are the parade's highest honors, by earning more votes than the parade's 263 other entries.

=== Orchestra ===
Students at Bellaire, Hurst Hills, Lakewood, North Euless, River Trails, Shady Brook, South Euless, Spring Garden, Viridian, and Wilshire elementary schools can participate in orchestral instruction based on the Suzuki method. Beginning in the 2005–2006 school year, students could continue the program at Central Junior High and, starting in the 2008–2009 school year, at L.D. Bell High School.

=== STEM education ===
Central Junior High has offered accelerated biology and physics classes, where students are able to take high school biology in 8th grade and high school physics in 9th grade (which was later discontinued in the year 2026 replacing it with chemistry), since the 2013–2014 school year. However, after a 2015–2016 pilot program at Stonegate Elementary and Central Junior High involving hands-on projects and project-based learning, the school was officially designated a STEM (Science, Technology, Engineering, and Mathematics) School of Choice for the 2016–2017 school year. The program continues through the high school level at the Buinger Career and Technical Education Academy with many STEM classes such as Engineering Design and Honors Aerospace.

In conjunction with Bell Helicopter Textron and other local companies, HEB ISD also hosts an annual drone camp at the Buinger Career & Technical Education Academy.

== Schools and facilities ==
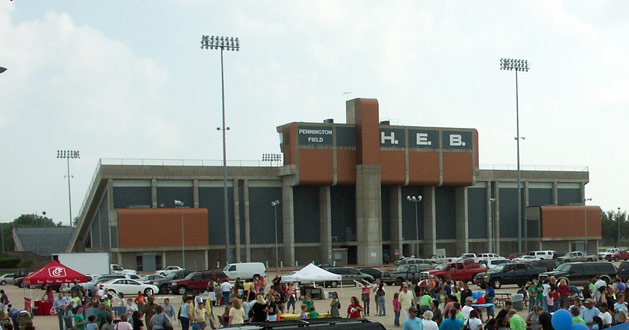
Pennington Field

The district has 21 elementary schools, 5 junior high schools, 2 traditional high schools, one non-traditional high school, and a career and technical education academy. Students are assigned to elementary schools, junior high schools, and high schools based on the location of their home but may apply to transfer to other schools if they would like to participate in certain programs. Students at both traditional high schools can travel during the school day to the academy to participate in specialized career training programs. Unique among area districts, the two HEB ISD high schools consist of Grades 10 through 12; 9th graders remain at the junior high level, but can try out and compete for high school teams.

HEB ISD schools have been recognized four times by the Blue Ribbon Schools Program: Harwood Junior High was recognized in 1986–1987, L. D. Bell High School in 1994–1996, and both Central and Hurst Junior High Schools in 2010.

The school district also owns and operates Pennington Field, a stadium used by both of the district's high schools, the DFW Tornados PDL soccer team, and the Dallas Diamonds football team.

== Leadership ==
The District is led by a Superintendent chosen by the Board of Trustees.

On January 27, 1964, the Board of Trustees replaced at-large elections with elections for designated district-wide positions. The seven members of the Board of Trustees are elected in May of odd-numbered years to serve staggered four-year terms. They meet at least twice each month to discuss policy, bond elections and tax rates, approving district personnel, and governing the management of the District. During at least one board meeting each month, an Open Forum session is held, which invites public participation and comments similar to a town hall meeting.

Board of Trustees

- Place 1 - Julie Cole (2013–2027)
- Place 2 - John Biggan (2025–2029)
- Place 3 - Matt Romero (2013–2029)
- Place 4 - Becky Ewart (2024–2029)
- Place 5 - Chris Brown (2021–2029)
- Place 6 - Andy Cargile (2008–2027)
- Place 7 - Fred Campos (2015–2027)

Former superintendent Dr. Gene Buinger planned to retire on June 30, 2012, as announced on the District's official website. The former Deputy Superintendent of Educational Operations, Steve Chapman, succeeded Dr. Buinger. Chapman was officially appointed at a February 2013 board meeting. Steve Chapman announced his own retirement on December 14, 2021. On March 28, 2022, the HEB ISD school board approved Joe Harrington as the school district's new superintendent.

== Honors ==
The HEB ISD School Board of Trustees was the eighth Texas school board (out of 1,050) ever to be recognized with an award from the Texas Association of School Boards for Good Governance and "walking the talk", including voluntarily participating in and passing a governance audit, supporting a fiscally responsible school district, and undergoing school board training.

Both of HEB ISD's high schools are ranked on Newsweek's 2007 list of the top 1,200 high schools in the country: L.D. Bell High School is listed 210th (4th highest in Tarrant County) and Trinity High School is listed 304th (6th highest in Tarrant County). The rankings are based on the number of Advanced Placement and International Baccalaureate tests taken by graduating seniors.

SchoolMatch named HEB ISD a What Parents Want Award-winner for the first time in 1992 and again every year from 1994 through 2012. The honor is given to the top 16% of the 15,571 public school districts that SchoolMatch monitors, based on criteria compiled through over 97,000 parent questionnaires: academics, instructional expenditures, secondary-level programs, and more.

After being named a "Best Practices" district in March 2007 and a top four district in August 2007, HEB ISD was named the top school district in the state in 2008, 2009, 2010, and 2011 by the Education Resource Group (ERG). The awards are based on a combination of student performance and operating efficiency.

In 2007 through 2017, the American Music Conference (sponsored by the NAMM Foundation) named HEB ISD one of the "Best Communities for Music Education". Applicant districts provided information about funding, enrollment, student-teacher ratios, music class participation, instruction time, facilities, support for the music program, private music lesson participation, and more.

The Texas Education Agency (TEA) has awarded the District "Superior" ratings in the Financial Integrity Rating System of Texas (FIRST) for eight years in a row (2003–2010). These ratings are based on criteria including low administrative spending, low student-teacher ratios, and more.

In October 2006, United Educators Association of Texas (UEA) presented to the HEB ISD Board of Trustees a special proclamation in honor of the Board's history of support for teacher salaries at all levels. Out of 32 school districts in the western Dallas/Fort Worth Metroplex area, HEB ISD ranked in the top three in every category compared (including teachers with a bachelor's or master's degree, and years of experience varying from none to 30).

In March 2005, the District received the Lone Star Award for best public relations practices in the state from the Texas Public Relations Association, recognizing outstanding ethics and business operations when communicating with stakeholders.
