= Trinity High School (Euless, Texas) =

Coordinates: 32.842892°N 97.09639°W

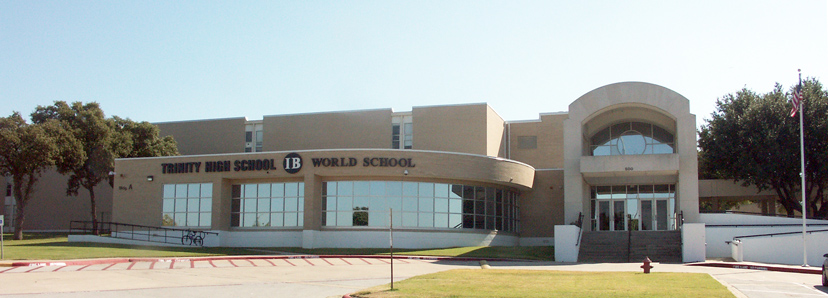

Location
- 500 North Industrial Boulevard; Euless, Tarrant County, Texas 76039; United States

Information
- Type: Public
- Motto: Responsibility, Pride, and Determination Make Trinity Different
- Established: 1968
- School district: Hurst-Euless-Bedford Independent School District
- NCES School ID: 482406002682
- Principal: Ronald Pugh
- Faculty: 156.39 (FTE)
- Grades: 10–12
- Enrollment: 2,710 (2023–2024)
  - Grade 10: 914
  - Grade 11: 922
  - Grade 12: 874
- Student to teacher ratio: 17.33
- Colors: Scarlet and Black
- Athletics conference: UIL Class 6A
- Mascot: Trojan
- Rival: L.D. Bell High School
- Newspaper: Palantir
- Yearbook: Triune
- Website: www.hebisd.edu/Trinity

Trinity High School (also known as Euless Trinity in sports) is a public high school in Euless, Texas. The school serves grade levels 10–12 and is a part of the Hurst-Euless-Bedford Independent School District.

The school is named "Trinity" as an homage to the three cities comprised by the school district in which it is located: Hurst, Euless, and Bedford (and also as a reference to the nearby Trinity River, which forms the southern border of the school district). The school's mascot is a Trojan. The Trinity High School football team has won the Texas 5A Division 1 State Championship three times (2005, 2007, 2009).

As of 2025, education platform Niche ranked Trinity High School as the most diverse public high school in Texas and the 16th most diverse public high school in the country based on student demographics and parent/student surveys. In 2017, the school was rated "Met Standard" by the Texas Education Agency, with a 5-Star Distinction for Academic Achievements in ELA/Reading, Mathematics, Science, Social Studies, and Post Secondary Readiness.

== History ==
Alternate logo of Trinity High School, used on some school stationery

Trinity was established as the second high school in the Hurst-Euless-Bedford Independent School District. The first HEB ISD high school was L.D. Bell High School, which opened in 1957 in Euless, but moved to its current site in Hurst in 1965. The Trinity campus sits on a hillside in west central Euless, less than 500 feet from the Euless-Bedford city limit.

In November 2023, voters approved an HEB ISD bond package that included plans to replace Trinity High School's current buildings with a new building at the same campus.

== Campus ==
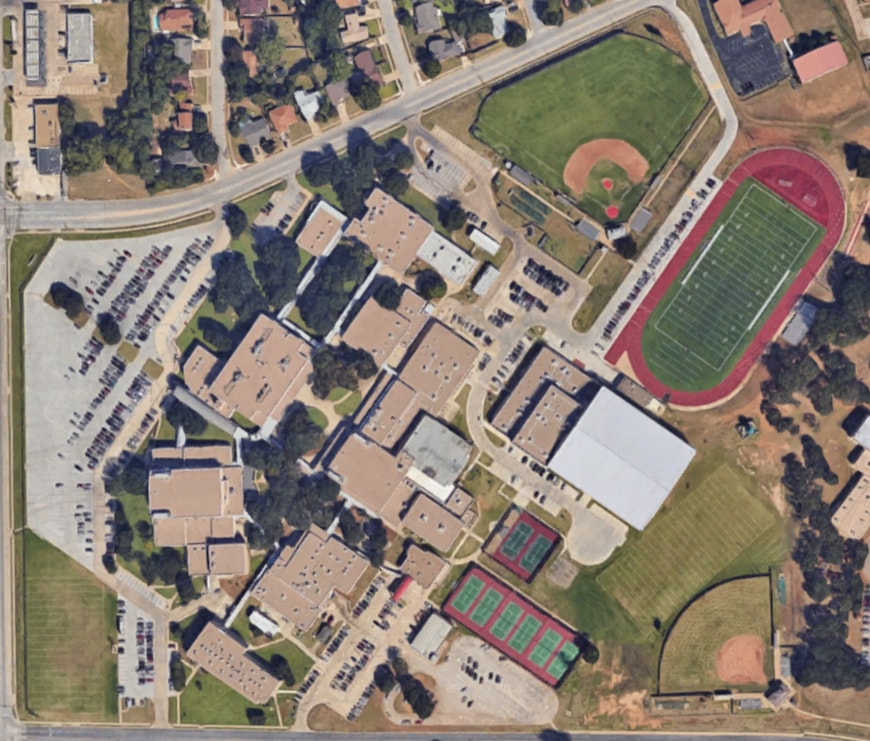
Aerial image of the entire campus

Trinity High School is made up of eleven distinct buildings, most of which are named for the department they house (often abbreviated to just the first letter). The nine original buildings were: the Fine Arts Building, the Academics Building, the Library, the Science Building, the Physical Education Building, the Cafeteria, the Driver's Education Building, a small two-story building called D-Building, and an Administration Building. The Physical Education building formerly included a natatorium that was mothballed and eventually demolished in the 2010s. The late 1990s brought three major changes to the campus: a system of covered walkways was built to connect most of the school's buildings, a new band hall was added to the Fine Arts Building, and a wing was added to the Academics Building. This new wing became the new face of the campus because of its large and prominent façade and provided new offices for the principal, assistant principals, and secretaries. The original Administration Building was converted to house the counselors' offices.

In the first few years of the new millennium, two new buildings were added to the Trinity campus. The two-story N-Building lies on the campus's southern edge and houses the Foreign Language Department and many classes of and the office of the coordinator of the International Baccalaureate program. Just a little further into campus from the D-Building is the new W-Building. The W-Building houses special education classrooms and is specifically designed to accommodate the needs of students with physical disabilities. An activity center named for former principal B.J. Murray opened in 2013 with a 70-yard indoor field, offices, locker rooms, and a weight room dedicated after Trinity alum Ryan McBean. The center is colloquially referred to as "the Mac".

== Student body ==
During the 2016–2017 school year, Trinity High School enrolled 2,574 students in grade 10 (34.4%), grade 11 (34.0%), and grade 12 (31.6%). Ethnicities represented include white (31.3%), Hispanic (29.2%), African Americans (21.4%), Asian and Pacific Islander (9.9%), Native Hawaiians and Pacific Islander (3.2%), two or more races (4.3%), and Native American (0.8%). Forty-eight percent were economically disadvantaged.

Euless is home to one of the largest Tongan populations outside of Tonga; the school is known for welcoming and celebrating students from diverse backgrounds. One of the school's most visible cultural celebrations is the varsity football team's performance of the Sipi Tau before and after each game.

Trinity High School receives students from three feeder schools: all students from Euless Junior High school and Harwood Junior High school attend Trinity along with roughly half of the students from Central Junior High school. Students in the attendance zones for Bell Manor, Lakewood, Meadow Creek, Midway Park, North Euless, Oakwood Terrace, Shady Brook, South Euless, Spring Garden, Viridian, and Wilshire elementary schools attend Trinity High School.

The State of Texas defined "college readiness," or readiness to undergo university studies, by scores on the ACT and SAT and in the 11th grade Texas Assessment of Knowledge and Skills (TAKS) tests. Holly Hacker of The Dallas Morning News said that the school was "high-performing" in that regard.

== Academics ==
Among Tarrant County high schools, Trinity High School ranks eighth (of forty-six) in average points above passing on the 11th grade TAKS test.

On The Washington Post's 2016 list of America's most challenging high schools, Trinity High School is ranked 1497th out of approximately 22,000 public high schools, based on a ratio of 1.886 college-level exams taken per graduate. Using similar criteria, the school was ranked 304th in the nation (and 6th within Tarrant County) on Newsweek's 2007 list of the top 1,200 high schools in the country

Among Trinity's class of 2016, the average Old SAT score was 1442 (Texas state average was 1375), and the average ACT score was 21.8 (Texas state average was 20.3). In 2016, the school had 7 National Merit semifinalists and 2 semifinalists in 2017.

Trinity High School is an International Baccalaureate World School. The program graduated its first group of seniors in 2004.

== Athletics ==
Trinity High School has been ranked in the top 1% of "Best High Schools Sports" at the local, state-wide, and national levels. Trinity hosts its home football games at Pennington Field, which they share with L.D. Bell High School. Most athletic activity at Trinity occurs in the "P" building, as well as the activity center.

Players performing the Haka in the annual game versus L.D. Bell

=== Championships ===
Rodeo

- 1978 Chute dogging Individual State Champion (Barry Winford)
- 1979 Saddle bronc Individual State Champion (Dino Hebb)

Speech & Debate

- 1987 Debate Team State Mock Trial State Championship
- 1995 Texas Forensic Association Lincoln Douglas Debate State Championship (Jay Conklin)

Boys' Gymnastics

- 1990 THSGCA Division I State Champions
- 2002 THSGCA Division I State Champions

Drama

- 1992 One Act Play UIL 5A State Champions You Can’t Take It With You

Journalism

- 1992 UIL Silver Star Award for Newspaper, The Palantir

Girls' soccer

- NSCAA Team Academic Awards - 2005 thru 2019 (15 consecutive)

Football

- 28 state playoff appearances, including 23 district championships, seven semifinal appearances, five state championship appearances, and three state titles.
- 2005 5A D1 UIL State Champions
- 2007 5A D1 UIL State Champions
- 2009 5A D1 UIL State Champions

Girls Lacrosse

- 2007 TGHSLL Division II State Champions
- 2009 TGHSLL Division II State Champions

Cheerleading

- 2008 National Champions

Criminal Justice

- 2008 Texas Public Service Association State Champions

Girls Wrestling

- 2020 UIL State Champions

== Fine arts ==
=== Band program ===
In January 1972, Trinity's symphonic band was invited to represent the United States by Mexico's Department of Cultural Exchange, performing at Three Rivers High School before playing three concerts in Monterrey, Mexico.

The band continues to participate in UIL competitions. In 2017, they resumed membership in Bands of America and participated in the Super-Regional Championship in Atlanta at the new Mercedes-Benz Stadium, where they placed 15th.

=== Drama ===
The Trinity Drama Department has also had its share of success, advancing to the State finals for UIL One Act Play in 1987, 1990, 1991, and 1992. They won the State Championship in 1992.

=== Photography ===
The Trinity Photography Department is a 6 time State Champion program. In 2008 Trinity had at least 9 finalists in the Best of College Photo Contest. At the Texas A&M Photo Shootout and the Association of Texas Photography Instructors Winter Conference in Arlington the Trojans brought home 33 awards. In 2008 alone the Trinity Photo Department won over 100 awards. They also had a special appearance in the nationally broadcast Dallas Cowboys End of Year Special in 2008. The Trinity Photography Department won State Championships in 1996, 1997, 1999, 2002, 2005, and 2019.

=== Choir ===
The Trinity Choir program has seen success after success in National Competitions and at home. In 2007, the Trinity High School Choirs won 10 out of the 11 awards at the Disney Festival and received Sweepstakes ratings in the UIL Competition. The show choir, Harmony, is a 14-16 member auditioned ensemble and perform throughout the Metroplex including places such as The Mansion on Turtle Creek, the Nationalization Ceremony for immigrants, and the Ft. Worth Petroleum Club.

=== Yearbook ===
Trinity's Triune Yearbook has received National Awards for its 2007 publication. Including the Gold Medalist from the Columbia Scholastic Press Association, the highest ranking category. They have been nominated to receive the prestigious CSPA Crown Award presented only to the top 30 yearbooks in the Nation. They received the All-American rating with 5 marks of Distinction from the National Press Association, the NSPA's highest ranking. Triune has been selected as an elite NSPA Pacemaker Finalist recognizing the top 25 books nationally. They have also been selected by Taylor Publishing as a top 5% outstanding yearbook that will be shared with yearbook staffs around the country.

=== Trojan Crew ===
Formerly called Trojan Men, the now co-educational Trojan Crew waves the schools banner during football games, the school scores a touchdown, the Crew runs the letter flags and Nike flags down the field in support, raising the spirits of the players and the student section.

== Notable alumni ==
- Mike Baab; 1978; Former NFL center (1982–92) for the Browns, Patriots, and Chiefs
- Mack Beggs; 2018; Wrestling champion and transgender rights activist
- Layzie Bone; 1991; Rapper, member of Bone Thugs-n-Harmony
- D. J. Brigman; 1994; professional golfer
- Brandon Brooks; 2005; Basketball player formerly with the Tulsa 66ers
- Neil Denari; 1975; Architect
- Ollie Gordon II; 2022; Running back for the Miami Dolphins
- Robert Griffin; 2007; Former NFL player with the New York Jets and Indianapolis Colts
- Erek Hansen; 2001; Basketball player, formerly with the Albuquerque Thunderbirds
- Jhivvan Jackson; 2017; basketball player for San Pablo Burgos of the Spanish Liga ACB.
- Kader Kohou; 2015; NFL cornerback for the Miami Dolphins
- Bethany Joy Lenz; attended c. 1999 (graduated elsewhere); Actress on One Tree Hill (TV series) and singer-songwriter
- Kim Matula; 2006; Actress
- Ryan McBean; 2003; Former NFL defensive end with the Baltimore Ravens
- Denarius McGhee; 2010; College and NFL football coach
- R. K. Milholland; 1993; Webcomic author
- Michael Muhney; 1993; Actor
- Dimitri Nance; 2006; Former NFL running back with the Atlanta Falcons and Green Bay Packers, Super Bowl XLV Champion
- Sarah Shahi; 1998; Actress
- Garth TenNapel; 1972; Former NFL linebacker (1976–78) for the Lions and Falcons
- Sam Tevi; 2013; Former NFL player for the Los Angeles Chargers and Indianapolis Colts
- Myles Turner; 2014; NBA Center with the Indiana Pacers
- Trevor Vittatoe; 2006; Former NFL quarterback with the Chicago Bears and Indianapolis Colts
- Sara Grace Wallerstedt; 2017; Fashion model
- Daniel Woolard; 2003; Daniel Woolard; 2003; Former professional soccer player (Chicago Fire, D.C. United)
- Dustin Ybarra; 2004; Stand-up comedian and actor
