= Euless, Texas =

- City
- City of Euless
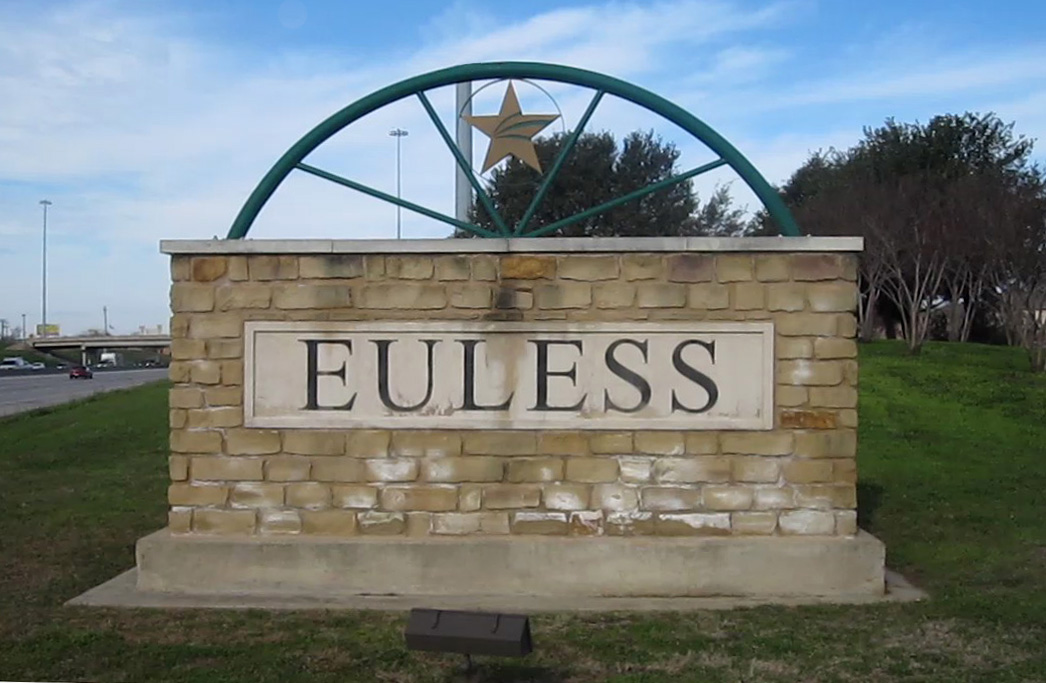
- Sign when entering Euless

- Location of Euless in Tarrant County, Texas
- Coordinates: 32°51′02″N 97°06′30″W
- Country: United States
- State: Texas
- County: Tarrant

Government
  - Type: Council-Manager

Area
  - City: 16.20 sq mi (41.96 km^{2})
  - Land: 16.12 sq mi (41.76 km^{2})
  - Water: 0.077 sq mi (0.20 km^{2})
- Elevation: 581 ft (177 m)

Population (2020)
  - City: 61,032
  - Rank: (US: 691st)
  - Density: 3,547.8/sq mi (1,369.81/km^{2})
  - Urban: 5,121,892 (6th)
  - Metro: 6,810,913 (4th)
- Time zone: UTC-6 (CST)
  - Summer (DST): UTC-5 (CDT)
- ZIP codes: 76039-76040
- Area codes: 214, 469, 945, 972, 682, 817
- FIPS code: 48-24768
- GNIS feature ID: 2410461
- Website: www.eulesstx.gov

Euless (/ˈjuːlɪs/ YOO-liss) is a city in Tarrant County, Texas, United States, and a suburb of Fort Worth. Euless is part of the Mid-Cities region between Dallas and Fort Worth. In 2020 Census, the population of Euless was 61,032. The population of the city increased by 19.02% in 10 years.

The southwestern portion of Dallas/Fort Worth International Airport is inside the city limits of Euless.

== History ==
Euless is named after Elisha Adam Euless, a native of Tennessee who moved to Texas in 1867 and later bought 170 acres (0.69 km^{2}) of land on the current intersection of North Main St. and West Euless Boulevard. Euless started a cotton gin and a community center on his property and quickly became a prominent figure among other settlers. He was eventually elected county sheriff, both in 1892 and in 1894, after which Euless retired for health reasons. They developed around the land Euless owned, and the locals decided to name the city in honor of him.

=== Merced vs Kasson ===
In 2009 the U.S. Fifth Circuit Court of Appeals sided against the City of Euless in Merced vs Kasson. The city had tried to prohibit Mr. Merced (a Santeria priest) from practicing religious animal sacrifice in his home temple. The Court found that the city ordinances substantially burdened Mr. Merced's free exercise of religion and ordered that Mr. Merced could continue to practice his religious rituals. Also, the city was ordered to pay the plaintiff's court fees.

== Geography ==
According to the United States Census Bureau, the city has a total area of 16.3 square miles (42 km^{2}), all land.

=== Climate ===
The climate in this area is characterized by hot, humid summers and generally mild to cool winters. According to the Köppen Climate Classification system, Euless has a humid subtropical climate, abbreviated "Cfa" on climate maps.

== Demographics ==
Historical population
Census	Pop.	Note	%±
1960	4,263		—
1970	19,316		353.1%
1980	24,002		24.3%
1990	38,149		58.9%
2000	46,005		20.6%
2010	51,277		11.5%
2020	61,032		19.0%
2024 (est.)	60,010		−1.7%
U.S. Decennial Census

=== 2020 census ===
As of the 2020 census, Euless had a population of 61,032 and 24,800 households in the city.

The median age was 35.8 years. 22.9% of residents were under the age of 18 and 11.1% of residents were 65 years of age or older. For every 100 females there were 95.9 males, and for every 100 females age 18 and over there were 92.6 males age 18 and over.

100.0% of residents lived in urban areas, while 0.0% lived in rural areas.

There were 24,800 households in Euless, of which 32.1% had children under the age of 18 living in them. Of all households, 42.2% were married-couple households, 21.3% were households with a male householder and no spouse or partner present, and 29.6% were households with a female householder and no spouse or partner present. About 30.9% of all households were made up of individuals and 7.2% had someone living alone who was 65 years of age or older.

There were 26,450 housing units, of which 6.2% were vacant. The homeowner vacancy rate was 0.6% and the rental vacancy rate was 7.6%.

43.9% of the housing units were owned by the residents and the median value of the houses were estimated to be $200,500; 56.1% of the population lived in rented dwellings with median gross rent estimated to be $1,320 per month.

There were 13,245 families residing in the city; 6.1% of the population was under 5 years of age, 23% was under 18 years, 10.2% was 65 years and older, and 51% were female. There were 2,376 veterans residing in the city, the average household size was 2.56, and the average family size was 3.31.

Racial composition as of the 2020 census
Race	Number	Percent
White	28,304	46.4%
Black or African American	9,870	16.2%
American Indian and Alaska Native	450	0.7%
Asian	8,981	14.7%
Native Hawaiian and Other Pacific Islander	1,251	2.0%
Some other race	4,537	7.4%
Two or more races	7,639	12.5%
Hispanic or Latino (of any race)	12,274	20.1%

=== Tongan minority ===
Euless is notable for having one of the largest concentrations of Tongans outside of Tonga, with a community of 3,000–4,000 people.

The first Tongans to settle in Euless were either Siupeli Netane, an American Airlines employee, and his wife Halatono or the brothers Sione and Tevita Havea, students at the University of Texas at Arlington, depending on sources.

=== Nepalese minority ===
In some neighborhoods in Euless, the Nepalese community is quite culturally prevalent. Many people of Nepali origin have come as refugees from Bhutan. Due to a high concentration of Nepalese residents in the adjacent city of Irving, many important Nepalese cultural and national holidays are celebrated throughout Euless.

== Surrounding cities ==
Euless is located within the Mid-Cities region between Dallas and Fort Worth. Other cities within 10 miles (16 km) of Euless include Bedford to the west, Grapevine to the north, and Irving to the east.

== Government ==
=== Local government ===
According to the city's 2007–2008 Comprehensive Annual Financial Report, the city's various funds had $82.7 million in revenues, $73.7 million in expenditures, $239.5 million in total assets, $76.8 million in total liabilities, and $54.7 million in cash and investments.

The structure of the management and coordination of city services is:

City Department	Director
City Manager	Loretta Getchell
Deputy City Manager	Chris Barker
Director of Finance	Janina Jewell
Fire Chief	Wes Rhodes
Police Chief	Michael Brown
Director of Parks and Community Services	Ray McDonald
Director of Planning & Economic Development	Mike Collins
Director of Public Works	Hal Cranor

The Euless City Council as of October 2026 consisted of:

- Mayor: Tim Stinneford
- Place 1: Zariyan Stark
- Place 2: Jeremy Tompkins
- Place 3: Eddie Price
- Place 4: Perry Bynum, Mayor Pro Tem
- Place 5: Annabel Eads
- Place 6: Tika Paudel

The city of Euless is a voluntary member of the North Central Texas Council of Governments association, the purpose of which is to coordinate individual and collective local governments and facilitate regional solutions, eliminate unnecessary duplication, and enable joint decisions.

=== Arbor Daze ===
Arbor Daze is a celebration of trees. It is usually held in the municipal complex on the last weekend of April from Saturday to Sunday. During Arbor Daze there is a business tent, an art tent and two concert stages, as well as a kids' tent called Kidz Zone. Parking is available anywhere in the municipal complex or at the nearby church, First Baptist Euless.

The Arbor Daze festival has received over 47 awards and recognitions for its various programs and publications, making it one of the most decorated festivals in Texas.

=== Education ===
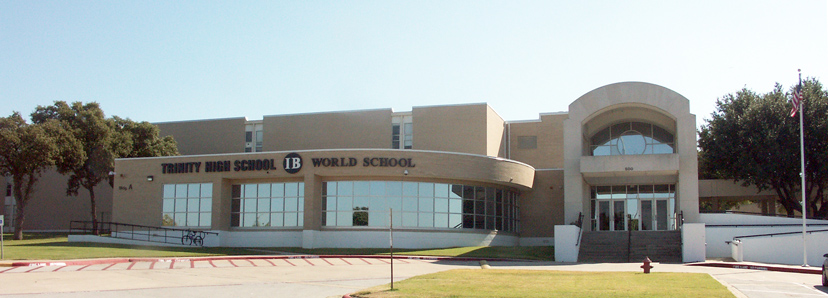
Trinity High School

Euless has eight elementary schools, two junior high schools, and one high school. Most of Euless is served by the Hurst-Euless-Bedford Independent School District. Some parts of the city belong to Grapevine-Colleyville Independent School District. Most GCISD grapevine students are zoned to Heritage Middle School, with some zoned to Colleyville Middle School. All are zoned to Colleyville Heritage High School.

There are two charter schools in the city: Harmony Science Academy (run by Harmony Public Schools) and Treetops School International.

The football team of Euless's Trinity High School has achieved national notoriety for its pre-game and post-game ritual dance, the New Zealand Māori Ka Mate haka, started by several players of Tongan descent. The team won 5A Division 1 state football championships in 2005, 2007, and 2009 and was featured in an EA Sports commercial in 2010.

== Economy ==
According to the city's 2022 Annual Comprehensive Financial Report, the top employers in the city are:

#	Employer	# of Employees	% of Total City Employment
1	Hurst-Euless-Bedford Independent School District	1,033	4.16%
2	LSG Sky Chefs, Inc.	663	2.67%
3	City of Euless	398	1.60%
4	Target	250	1.01%
5	Lowe's	225	0.91%
6	Life Outreach International	186	0.75%
7	Redi-Mix Concrete	185	0.74%
8	Dave and Buster's	150	0.60%
9	QuikTrip	130	0.52%
10	Flynn BEC, LP	120	0.48%
10	Thirsty Lion	120	0.48%

== Notable people ==
- Mike Baab, former NFL player for Cleveland Browns, and New England Patriots
- Aimee Buchanan (born 1993), American-born former Olympic figure skater for Israel
- James T. Draper Jr., Baptist minister and former president of the Southern Baptist Convention
- Dianna Graves, member of the West Virginia House of Delegates
- Gary Hart, wrestler/manager, WCW, WCCW, Mid-Atlantic wrestling
- Kader Kohou, Ivorian professional American football cornerback
- Michael Muhney, actor on Veronica Mars and The Young and the Restless
- Adam Roarke, film actor who lived in Euless at the time of his death
- Sarah Shahi, actress on The L Word
- Garth TenNapel, former professional football player attended Trinity High School and Texas A&M
- Kevin Thompson, member of the Arizona Corporation Commission, and former City of Mesa, Arizona
- Janine Turner, actress who starred on Northern Exposure, raised in Euless
- Myles Turner, professional basketball player was raised in Euless and attended Trinity High School
