= History of Dallas (1996–present) =

This article traces the history of Dallas, Texas (USA) during the city's modern period from 1996 to the present.

== Telecom boom ==
In the late 1990s, the booming telecom industry exploded in Dallas, especially in areas like Las Colinas and the Telecom Corridor. During this time, Dallas became known as Texas's Silicon Valley, or the "Silicon Prairie."

== 2001 recession ==
Following the dot-com bubble-burst and the 11 September attacks on New York City and Washington, D.C., the city slipped into recession from damage to two of its vital industries — transportation and telecommunications.

== 21st Century boom ==
By 2004, signs of an economic turnaround began to appear. In 2005, three towers began construction amid tens of residential conversions and smaller residential projects. By the year 2010, the North Central Texas Council of Governments expects 10,000 residents to live within the loop. Just north, Uptown is one of the hottest real estate markets in the country. At the beginning of 2006, nine highrise residential buildings or hotels were under construction in that area. Leading the way is the US$500 million phase two of Victory Park, a $3 billion+ project. At full build-out, it should contain more than 4,000 residences and 4,000,000 square feet (370,000 m^{2}) of office and retail space.

The Arts District in downtown is also expected to become a major point of growth. As the Dallas Center for the Performing Arts Foundation implements construction on several new projects in its master plan for the area. When the new Winspear Opera House (Foster and Partners) and Wyly Theatre (Office for Metropolitan Architecture - Rem Koolhaas) join the existing Nasher Sculpture Center (Renzo Piano) and Meyerson Symphony Center (I.M. Pei and Partners), Dallas will be the only city in the world that has four buildings within one contiguous block that are all designed by Pritzker Architecture Prize winners.

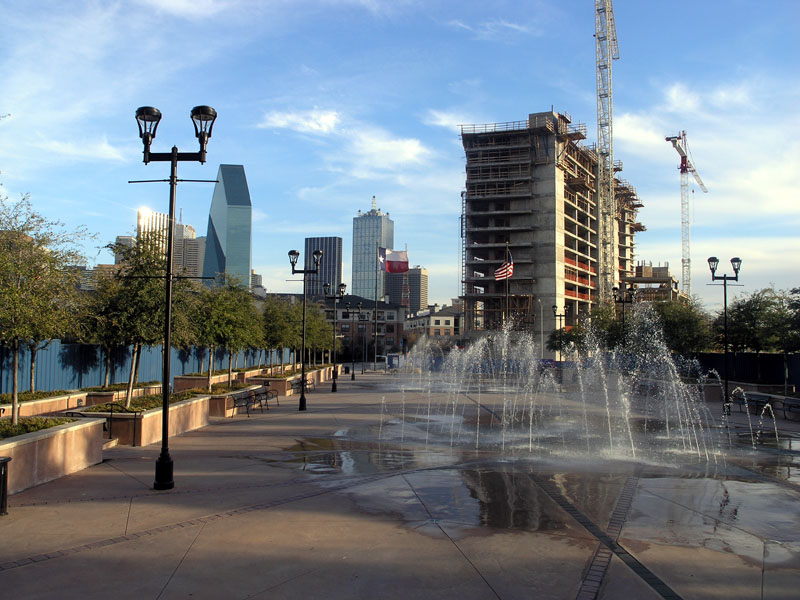
Construction in Victory Park in early 2005

== Hurricanes Katrina and Rita ==
Dallas served as a major refuge city for 2005's Hurricane Katrina and Rita. Reunion Arena and the Dallas Convention Center served as evacuee camps for thousands in the months following the storms. In all, 46,000 evacuees filled Texas public schools after Katrina in the fall of 2005 — the largest increases in the Dallas area took place in the Dallas Independent School District with 1,900 new students, Arlington ISD with 1,069, Richardson ISD with 964, and Fort Worth ISD with 846.

== 2006 immigration record setting rally ==
An estimated half a million people attended the largest mass gathering in Dallas history and perhaps state history.
