= History of Dallas =

This article traces the history of Dallas, Texas, (United States).

== Indigenous and colonial era (to 1838) ==
The Caddo inhabited the Dallas area before it was settled by Europeans. All of Texas became part of the Spanish Viceroyalty of New Spain in the 16th century. The area was also claimed by the French, but in 1819 the Adams-Onís Treaty officially placed Dallas well within Spanish territory by making the Red River the northern boundary of New Spain.

One European who probably visited the Dallas area was Athanase de Mezieres in 1778. De Mezieres, a Frenchman in the service of the King of Spain probably crossed the West Fork of the Trinity River near present-day Fort Worth. He wrote:

It is worthy to note that from the Brazos River on which the Tuacanas are established, and until one reaches the river which bathes the village of the Taovayzes (Red River), one sees on the right a forest that the natives appropriately call the Grand Forest. ...it is very dense, but not very wide. It seems to be there as a guide to even the most inexperienced, and to give refuge in this dangerous region to those who, few in number and lacking in courage, wish to go from one village to another. — De Mezieres

Bolton argues that de Mezieres was describing the Eastern Cross Timbers and the route would have him crossing the West Fork of the Trinity River between the present Fort Worth and Arlington.

Present-day Dallas remained under Spanish rule until 1821, when Mexico declared independence from Spain, and the area became part of the Mexican state of Coahuila y Tejas. The Republic of Texas broke off from Mexico in 1836 and remained an independent country for nearly 10 years.

== Settlement (1839–1855) ==
John Neely Bryan, looking for a good trading post to serve Native Americans and settlers, first scouted the Dallas area in 1839, likely drawn by the intersection of Native American trails at a natural ford on the main stem of the Trinity. Bryan also knew that the planned Preston Trail was to run near the ford — the north–south route and the ford at Bryan's Bluff became more important when the United States annexed Texas in 1845.

After Bryan visited the area, he returned home to Arkansas. While there, a treaty was signed removing all Native Americans from Northern Texas. When he returned in November 1841, half of his customers were gone. He decided that, rather than a trading post, he would create a permanent settlement, which he founded in November 1841. In 1844 J. P. Dumas surveyed and laid out a 0.5 square miles (1.3 km^{2}) section of blocks and streets near present downtown. The origin of the name is uncertain. The official historical marker states it was named after future Vice President George M. Dallas of Philadelphia, Pennsylvania (1845-1849). However, this is disputed. Other potential theories for the origin include his brother, Commodore Alexander James Dallas, as well as brothers Walter R. Dallas or James R. Dallas.

== Early years (1856–1873) ==
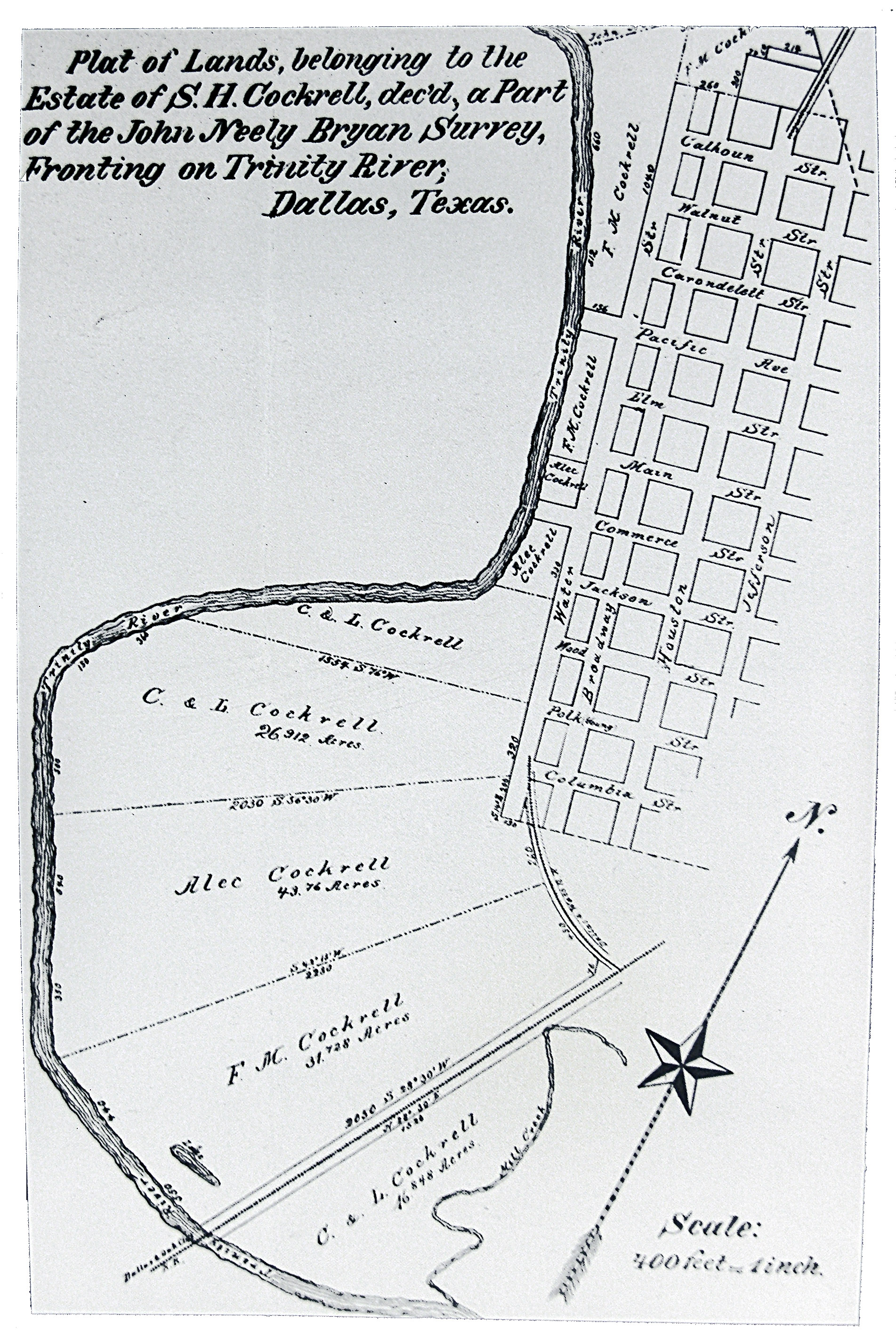
Map of central Dallas c. 1871

On 2 February 1856, Dallas was granted a town charter during the Regular session of the Sixth Texas Legislature. Samuel Pryor was elected the first mayor along with a constable, a treasurer-recorder, and six aldermen. By 1860, the town's population reached 678, including 97 African Americans (mostly enslaved), as well as Belgian, French, German, and Swiss immigrants. By that year, the railroad was approaching from the south, and several stage lines were already passing through the city.

In July 1860, a fire broke out in the square, destroying most of the buildings in the business district of Dallas. Many white residents assumed that slaves were behind the fire; two white abolitionists were run out of town, three African-American slaves were lynched at what would become Martyrs Park, and city officials ordered all other slaves in Dallas to be whipped. This period would later be characterized as the "Texas Troubles". On the eve of the Civil War in 1861, Dallas County voted 741–237 in favor of secession. On 8 June of that year, a state of war was declared, and citizens were very supportive of the effort. The town was a long way from any battles, and suffered no direct damage from the war.

On 19 June 1865 (Juneteenth), Texan slaves were emancipated, as announcement of the end of the war was delayed. Many African Americans migrated to Dallas after the war for work, because the city was thriving compared to other Southern cities. They also wanted to leave rural areas to escape the supervision of whites and establish their own communities. Freedmen's towns were scattered throughout Dallas. In attempts to maintain white supremacy, white insurgent veterans established a Ku Klux Klan chapter in 1868. By 1871, Dallas legally became a city. In 1869 the Reconstruction legislature established a funding mechanism to support public education for the first time, and authorized school districts to be set up across the state.

The major north–south (Houston and Texas Central Railroad) and east–west (Texas and Pacific Railway) Texas railroad routes intersected in Dallas in 1873, making it a regional commercial hub. The arrival of the trains also meant soaring populations — the population of Dallas shot from 3,000 in early 1872 to more than 7,000 in September of the same year. New buildings and new businesses appeared daily. Dallas was the epicenter of the markets for raw materials and commodity crops, such as grains and cotton, which were shipped to the South and East.

== Industrial period (1874–1929) ==
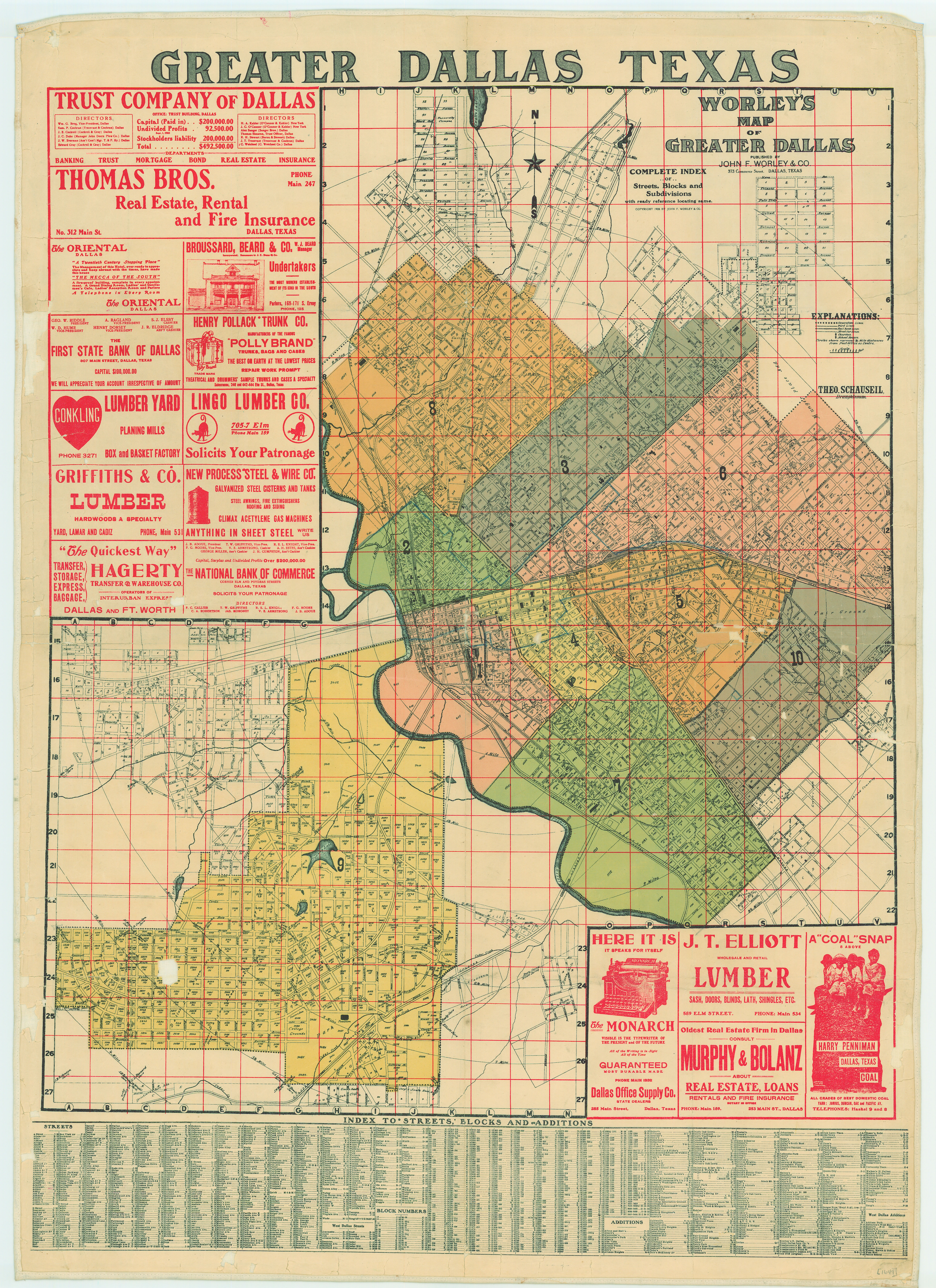
Dallas in 1905

In the decades after the railroads arrived, Dallas grew from a center of farming and ranching into a major city. The industrial growth in Dallas formed partially out of problems hurting Dallas area farmers: After buying supplies on credit during the year, farmers owed merchants the majority of their crop. Costs to ship to the coast were very high, and the price of cotton was dropping.

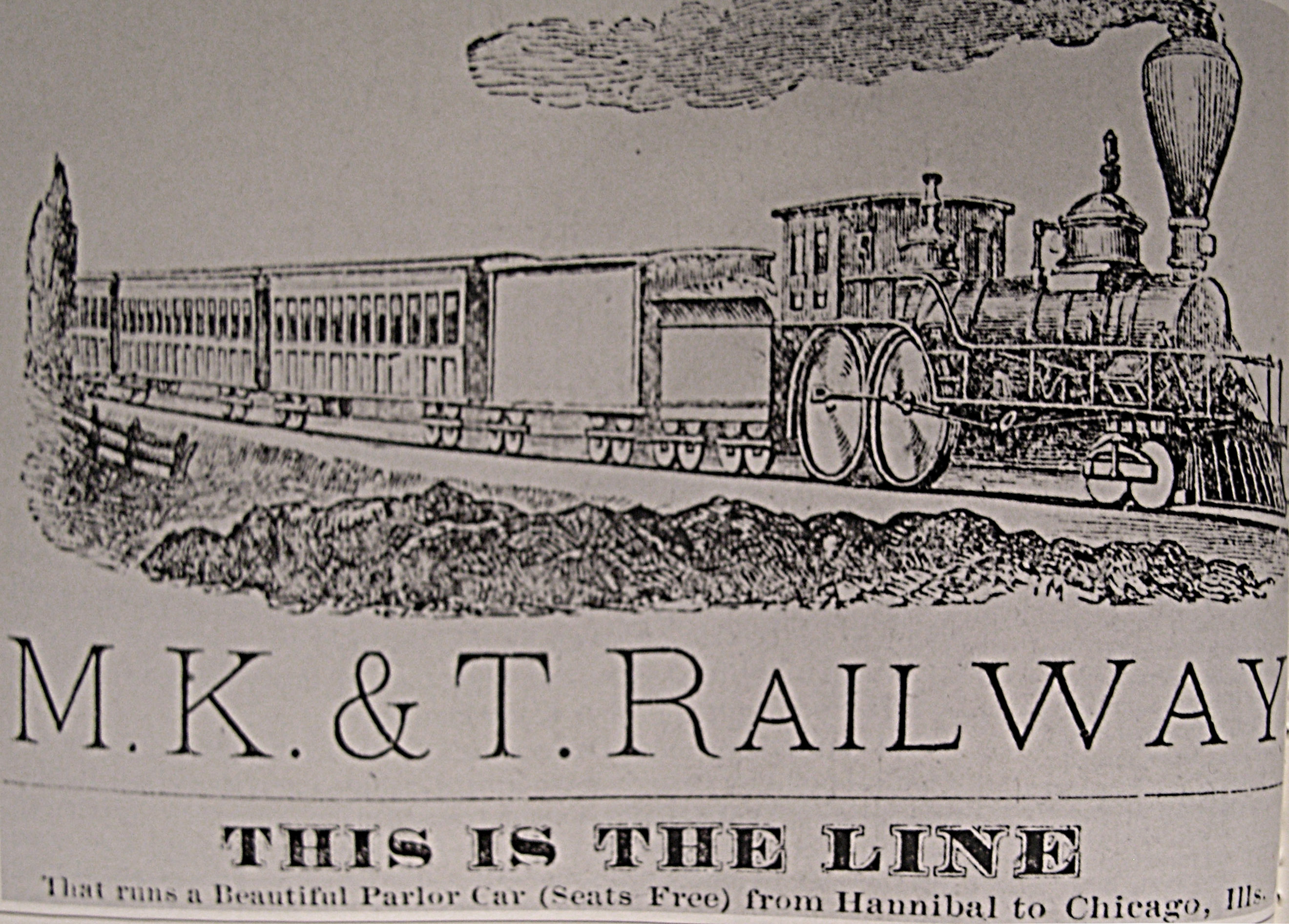
An advertisement for the Missouri-Kansas-Texas Railroad in an 1881 Dallas city directory

By 1880, the Missouri-Kansas-Texas Railroad, under the leadership of Jay Gould, reached Dallas. In 1885, the Main Street was lit with electricity. In 1888, the Dallas Zoo opened making it the first zoological garden in the state.

In 1890, Dallas annexed the city of East Dallas, which was larger geographically than Dallas. The annexation made Dallas the most populous city in Texas. In 1893, following the national financial panic, numerous industries and five Dallas banks failed. Cotton prices dipped below five cents a pound, and the lumber and flour markets had all but vanished, so many people began leaving the city. By 1898, the city began to recover and grow again. In 1894, Parkland Memorial Hospital opened just west of Oak Lawn. In 1903, Oak Cliff, a city across the Trinity River, was annexed.

By the turn of the 20th century, Dallas was the leading drug, book, jewelry, and wholesale liquor market in the Southwestern United States. It also quickly became the center of trade in cotton, grain, and even buffalo. It was the world's leading inland cotton market, and it still led the world in manufacture of saddlery and cotton gin machinery. During the early 20th century, Dallas transformed from an agricultural center to a center of banking, insurance, fashion retailing and other businesses. Founded here were Neiman Marcus and the now-defunct A. Harris and Sanger Brothers ready-to-wear stores. The 14-story Praetorian Building was the first skyscraper west of the Mississippi River and the tallest building in Texas.

Texan blacks, Mexican Americans and poor whites were excluded from much of the progress by being disfranchised when the state legislature imposed a poll tax in 1902. In addition, it had earlier established Jim Crow laws, making racial segregation legal and imposing white supremacy.

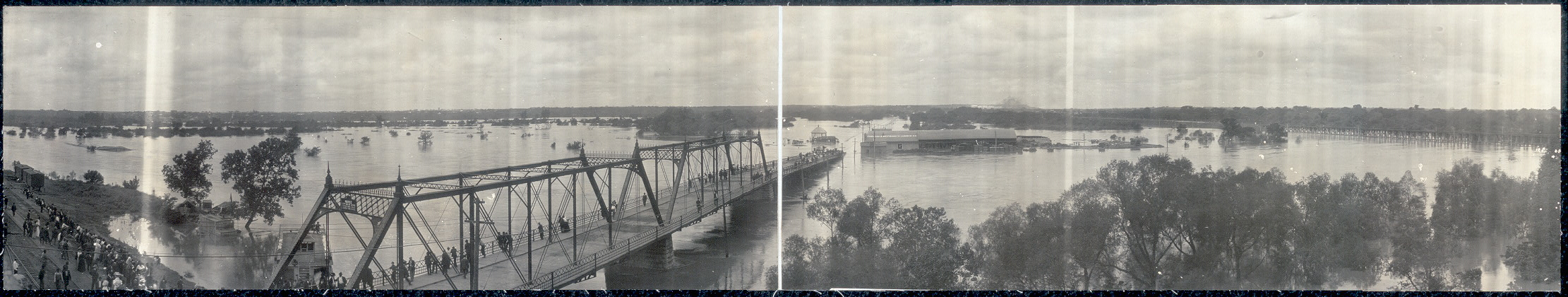
The Trinity River flooding on 8 July 1908.

In 1908, the Trinity River flooded, reaching a depth of 52.6 feet (16.03 m) and a width of 1.5 miles (2.4 km). Five people died, 4,000 were left homeless, and property damages were estimated at US$2.5 million at the time of the flood. After the flood, the city wanted to take action to control the Trinity and to build a bridge linking Oak Cliff and Dallas. In 1911, George Kessler, a city planner, created a plan for both the Trinity and the city. His plans were initially ignored but ultimately brought back, updated, in the 1920s. By the 1930s, many of his plans had been realized.

The expansion of industrial jobs attracted migrants from across the region, as well as waves of immigrants, first from southern and eastern Europe. The area bordered by Maple Avenue, McKinney Avenue and the MKT (Missouri, Kansas, Texas) Railroad became known as Little Mexico following 1910, when it was settled by a wave of Mexican immigrants, who left the disruption following the defeat of President Porfirio Diaz and his government, and the start of the Mexican Revolution (1910–1920). Mexicans from all walks of life came to the Dallas area to take jobs in factories, agriculture and the railroads.

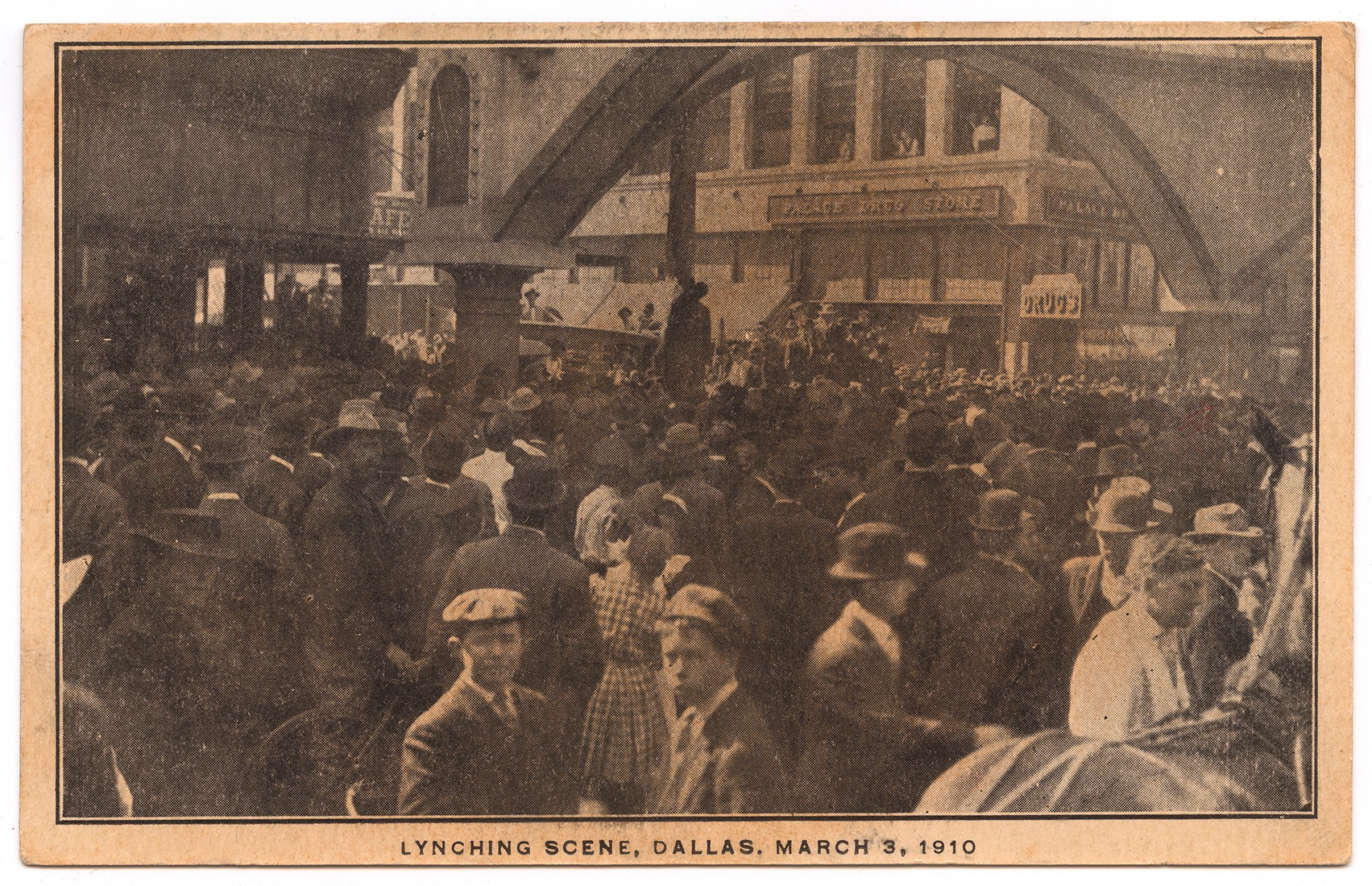
Postcard commemorating the 1910 lynching of Allen Brooks

A white mob of hundreds of people lynched a Black man, Allen Brooks, in 1910. The mob tortured Brooks, then killed him at the downtown intersection of Main and Akard by hanging him from a decorative archway inscribed with the words "Welcome Visitors." Thousands of men, women, and children came to gawk at the torture scene, collecting keepsakes of the murder. It was commemorated with picture postcards. No one was charged with a crime because authorities claimed they could not find anyone responsible.

In 1911, Dallas was chosen as the location of the eleventh regional branch of the Federal Reserve Bank. That year millionaire Dr. William Worthington Samuell, purchased the first ambulance for the city of Dallas, and later donated thousands of dollars to expand Parkland Hospital.

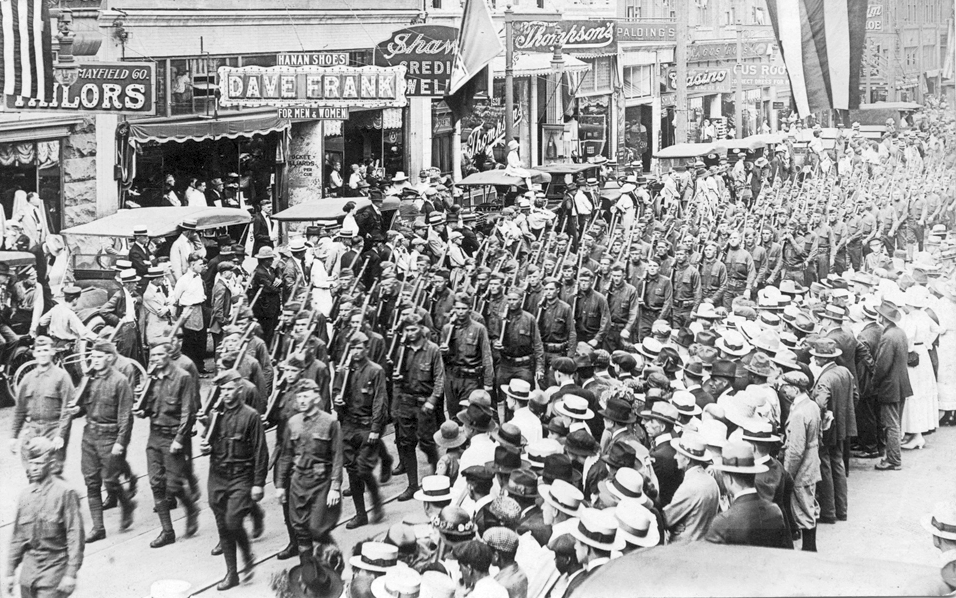
World War I soldiers parade through Dallas in 1919

The growth of aviation generated new development in the city in World War I. Love Field was established as an aviation training ground. Fair Park was the home of Camp Dick, a training facility as well. The city purchased Love Field in 1927 to use as a municipal airport. In 1915, Southern Methodist University opened.

== Oil period (1930–1945) ==
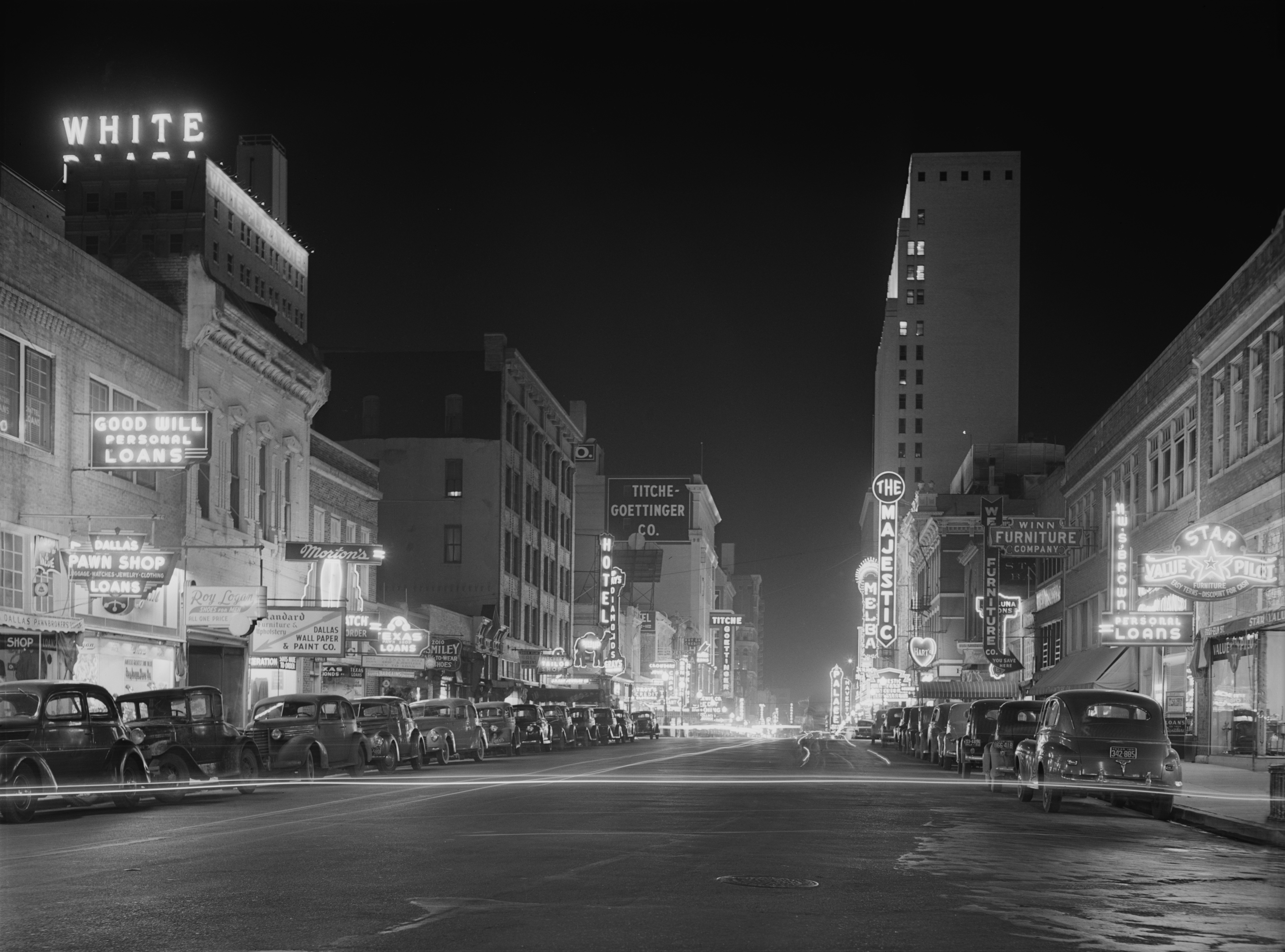
Night view of Elm Street, January 1942

Despite the onset of the Great Depression, business in construction was flourishing in 1930. That year, Columbus Marion "Dad" Joiner struck oil 100 miles (160 km) east of Dallas in Kilgore, spawning the East Texas oil boom. Dallas quickly became the financial center for the oil industry in Texas and Oklahoma. Banks made loans to develop the oil fields, and Dallas became the financial center for all oil fields in the Texas Panhandle, the Permian Basin, East Texas, Gulf Coast, and Oklahoma. This put off most thoughts of depression until the middle of 1931, when falling prices and overproduction affected the city economy negatively. By then, more than 18,000 people in the city were unemployed. Before the New Deal policy began, the city had a work-for-food program that helped many.

After a long campaign in the years leading up to 1936, the state of Texas chose Dallas as the site of the 1936 Texas Centennial Exposition. More than fifty buildings were built for the Exposition in Fair Park, and 10 million visitors came to see the US$25 million spectacle (US$580 million in today's terms).

During World War II, Dallas served as a manufacturing center for the war effort. In 1942, the Ford Motor plant in Dallas converted to war-time production, producing only jeeps and military trucks. In 1943 the city began war rationing, with 376,085 ration books distributed.

== Mid century (1946–1974) ==
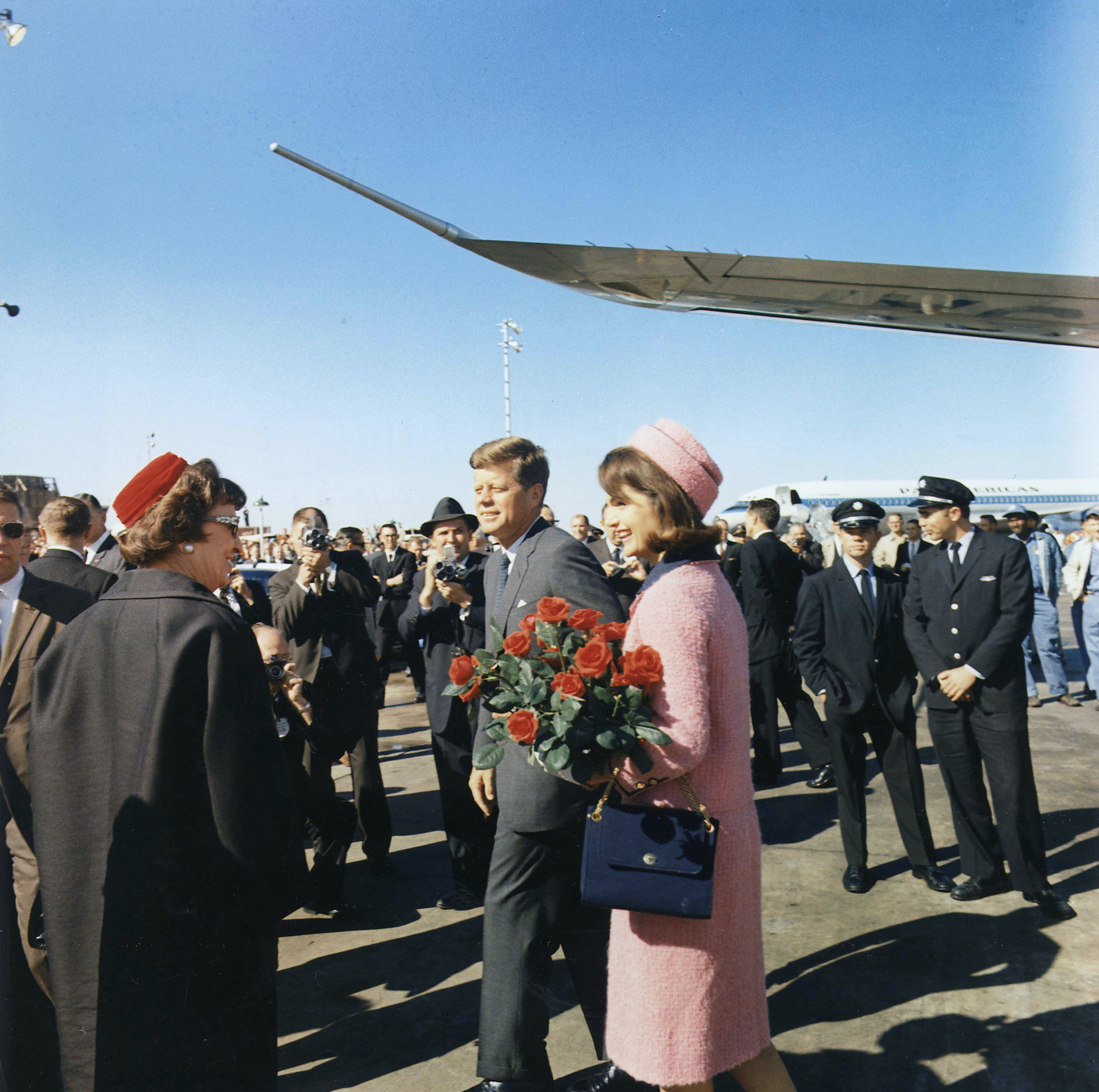
President Kennedy and his wife Jackie arriving at Love Field, Dallas, Texas, November 22, 1963

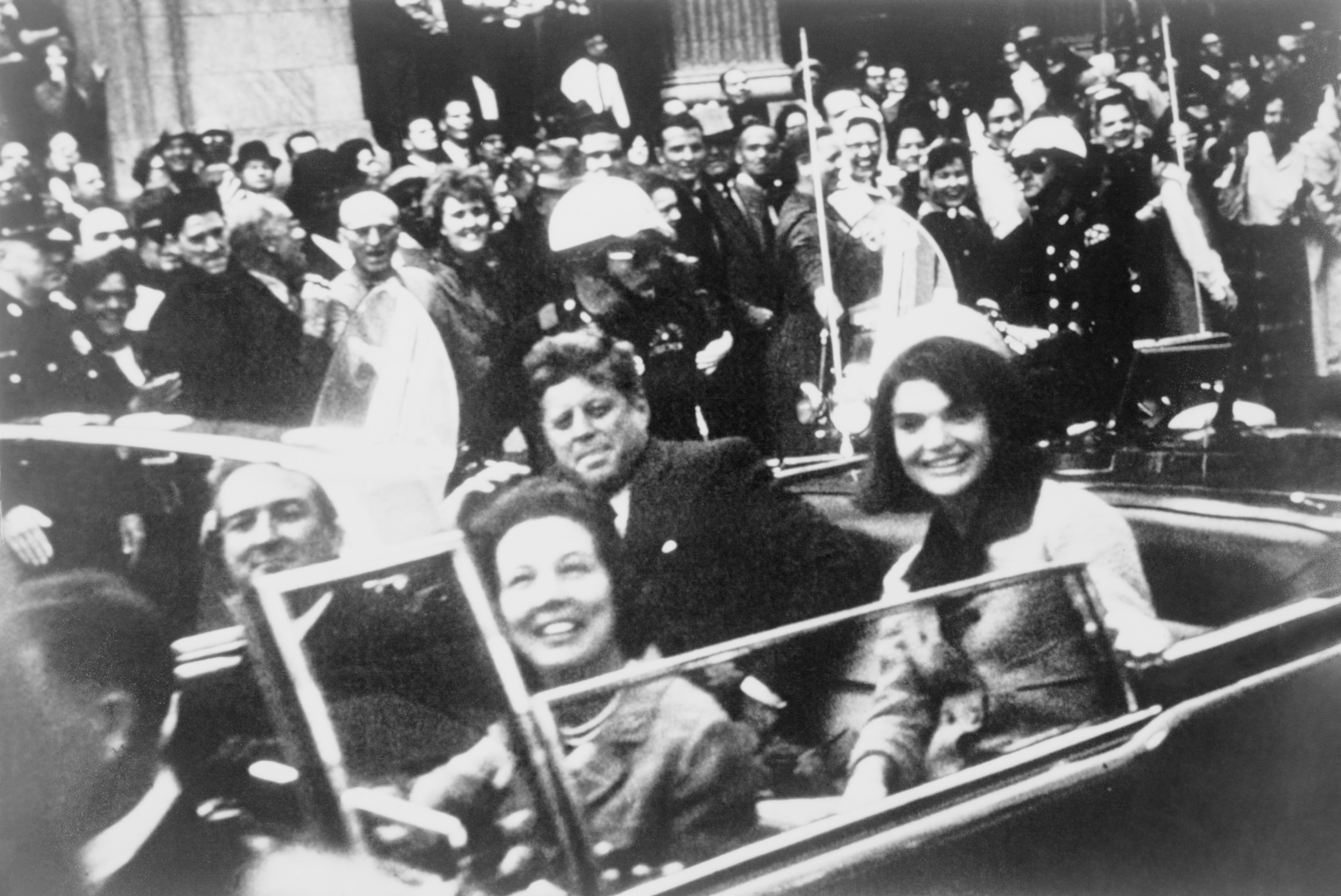
President John F. Kennedy in the presidential limousine, minutes before his assassination

In 1958 a version of the integrated circuit was invented in Dallas by Jack Kilby of Texas Instruments; this event punctuated the Dallas area's development as a center for high-technology manufacturing (though the technology Mr. Kilby developed was soon usurped by a competing technology simultaneously developed in the "Silicon Valley" in California by engineers who would go on to form Intel Corporation). During the 1950s and 1960s, Dallas became the nation's third-largest technology center, with the growth of such companies as Ling-Temco-Vought (LTV Corporation) and Texas Instruments. In 1957, developers Trammell Crow and John M. Stemmons opened a Home Furnishings Mart, designed by Donald H. Speck, that grew into the Dallas Market Center, the largest wholesale trade complex in the world. The same year, the Dallas Memorial Auditorium (now the Kay Bailey Hutchison Convention Center) opened near Canton and Akard Streets in what is now the Convention Center District of downtown. On November 22, 1963, United States President John F. Kennedy was assassinated on Elm Street while his motorcade passed through Dealey Plaza in downtown Dallas. The upper two floors of the building from which Lee Harvey Oswald shot Kennedy, the Texas School Book Depository, have been converted into a historical museum covering the former president's life and accomplishments, Kennedy was declared legally dead at Parkland Memorial Hospital, 30 minutes after the shooting.

== Real estate boom (1975–1985) ==
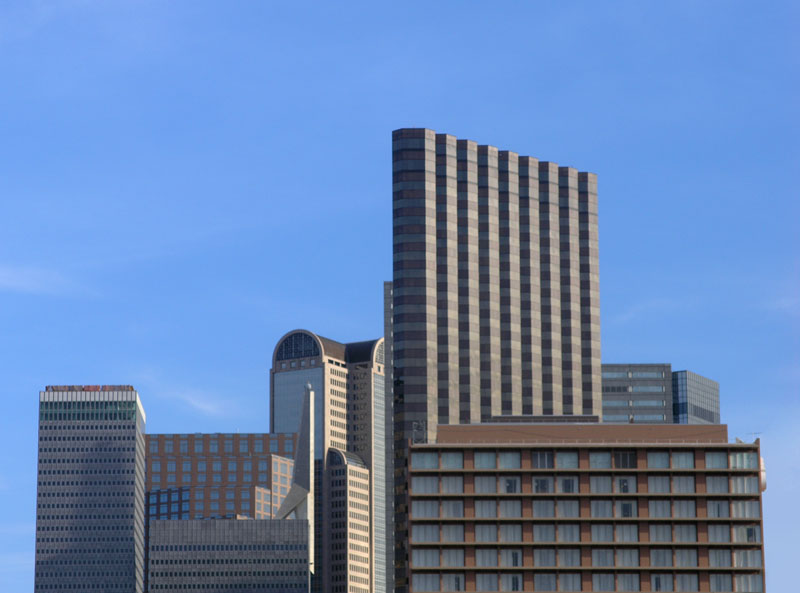
Every structure shown here was built during this period, along with tens of others

In the late 1970s and early to mid-1980s, Dallas underwent the building boom which produced a distinctive contemporary profile for the downtown area and a prominent skyline, influenced by nationally acclaimed architects. By the 1980s, when the oil industry mostly relocated to Houston, Dallas was beginning to benefit from a burgeoning technology boom (driven by the growing computer and telecom industries), while continuing to be a center of banking and business. In 1983, voters in Dallas and area cities approved the creation of Dallas Area Rapid Transit to replace the Dallas Transit System. Dallas annexed Audelia in 1981, and Renner in 1983. In 1984, the Dallas Museum of Art moved from Fair Park as one of the first buildings in downtown's Arts District. Also in 1984, the Republican National Convention was held in Dallas. In 1985, at the peak of the real estate boom, the 72-story Bank of America Plaza (then InterFirst Plaza) opened as the tallest building in Dallas. From the mid-to-late 1980s, many banks, especially in Dallas, collapsed during the Savings and Loan crisis, nearly destroying the city's economy and scrapping plans for hundreds of structures.

== Recession (1986–1995) ==
From the mid-1980s to 2005, not a single highrise structure was built within the downtown freeway loop. Over-speculating, over-building and the Savings and Loan crisis practically destroyed the city economically. In 1987, Annette Strauss was inaugurated as the first female mayor of Dallas. In 1989, the Morton H. Meyerson Symphony Center opened in the Arts District of downtown. Also during this time (1991), Dallas celebrated its 150th anniversary. During this time Dallas was one of the last remaining major cities with two major newspapers covering the news. However the Dallas Times Herald ended its publication in 1991, leaving The Dallas Morning News as the lone major newspaper covering Dallas news.

== Current period (1996–present) ==
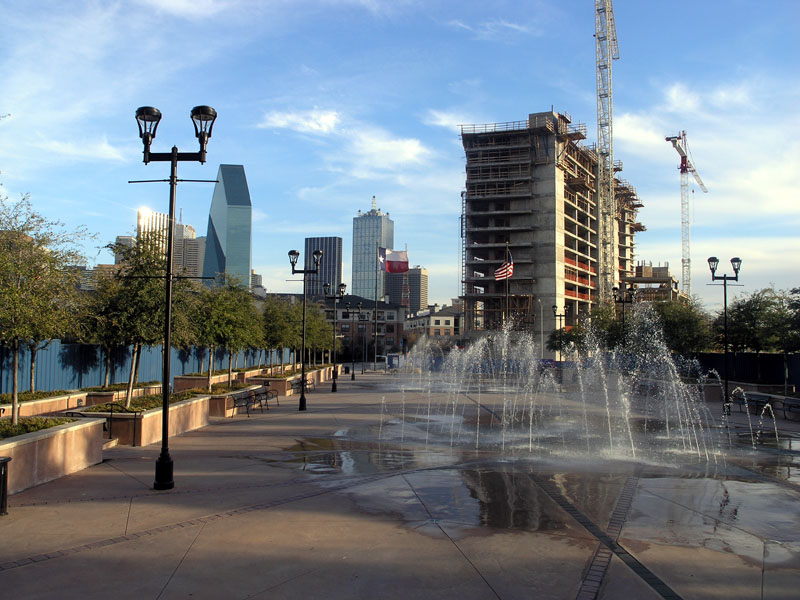
Construction in Victory Park in early 2005

In the late 1990s, the booming telecom industry exploded in Dallas, especially in areas like Las Colinas and the Telecom Corridor. During this time, Dallas became known as Texas's Silicon Valley, or the "Silicon Prairie". Another recession prompted by the dot-com bubble-burst and the 2001 terrorist attacks hurt several of the city's vital industries. By 2004, signs of an economic turnaround began to appear. In 2005, three towers began construction amid tens of residential conversions and smaller residential projects. By the year 2010, the North Central Texas Council of Governments expects 10,000 residents to live within the loop. Just north, Uptown is one of the hottest real estate markets in the country. At the beginning of 2006, nine highrise residential buildings or hotels were under construction in that area. Leading the way is the $500M phase two of Victory Park, a $3B+ project. At full build-out, it should contain more than 4,000 residences and 4M ft² of office and retail space.

The Arts District in downtown became a major point of growth as the Dallas Center for the Performing Arts Foundation implemented construction on several new projects in its master plan for the area. When the Winspear Opera House (Foster and Partners) and Wyly Theatre (Office for Metropolitan Architecture - Rem Koolhaas) joined the Nasher Sculpture Center (Renzo Piano) and Meyerson Symphony Center (I.M. Pei and Partners), Dallas became the only city in the world with four buildings within one contiguous block that were all designed by Pritzker Architecture Prize winners.

On May 31, 2016, several cities experienced record setting flooding.

On July 7, 2016, multiple shots were fired at a protest in downtown Dallas, held against the police killings of two black men from other states. The gunman targeted white officers, killing five and injuring nine. This marked the deadliest day for U.S. law enforcement since the September 11 attacks. After hours of negotiation failed, police resorted to a robot-delivered bomb, killing the gunman inside El Centro College.

On June 17, 2019, a shooting occurred outside the Earle Cabell Federal Building and Courthouse leaving the perpetrator dead and one injured.

== See also ==
- Dallas Historical Society
- National Register of Historic Places listings in Dallas County, Texas
- List of Dallas Landmarks

== Bibliography ==
=== Guides and popular history ===
- Acheson, Sam (1977). Dallas Yesterday. Dallas: SMU Press. ISBN 978-0870741609.
- Buckner, Sharry (2000). City Smart: Dallas/Ft. Worth. Avalon Travel Publishers. ISBN 978-1562614331. excerpt and text search
- Calvin, Peter A. (2007). Dallas, Texas: A Photographic Portrait. Rockport, MA: Twin Lights Publishers. ISBN 978-1885435750. excerpt and text search
- Fitzgerald, Ken (2013). Dallas Then and Now. London: Pavilion Books. ISBN 978-1909108400. excerpt and text search
- Hazel, Michael V (1997). Dallas: A History of Big D. Austin: Texas State Historical Society. ISBN 978-0876111635.
- Hill, Patricia Evridge (1996). Dallas: The Making of a Modern City. Austin: University of Texas Press. ISBN 978-0292731042.
- McDonald, William L. (1978). Dallas Rediscovered: A Photographic Chronicle of Urban Expansion, 1870–1925. Dallas: Dallas Historical Society. ISBN 978-0932018007.
- Payne, Darwin (2000). Big D: Triumphs and Troubles of an American Supercity in the 20th Century (Revised ed.). Dallas: Three Forks Press. ISBN 978-1893451049.
- Payne, Darwin (1982). Dallas: An Illustrated History. Woolands Hills, CA: Windsor Publications. ISBN 978-0897810340.
- Rafferty, Robert R.; Reynolds, Loys (2003). Lone Star Guide to the Dallas/Fort Worth Metroplex (Revised ed.). Lanham, MD: Taylor Trade Publishing. ISBN 978-1589070059.
- Rogers, John William (1951). The Lusty Texans of Dallas. New York: Dutton.
- Shay, Kevin James (2003). A Parent's Guide to Dallas-Fort Worth. Mars Publishing. ISBN 978-1931199247. excerpt and text search
- Maxine, Holmes; Saxon, Gerald D., eds. (1992). The WPA Dallas Guide and History. Dallas: Dallas Public Library. ISBN 0-929398-31-9.

=== Specialized studies ===
- Acheson, Sam (1938). 35,000 Days in Texas: A History of the Dallas News and its Forbears. New York: The Macmillan Company.
- Adler, Rachel H. (2008). Yucatecans in Dallas, Texas: Breaching the Border, Bridging the Distance (Second ed.). London: Routledge. ISBN 978-0205521029.
- Biderman, Rose G. (1996). "The Sanger Brothers and Their Role in Texas History". Western States Jewish History. 28 (2): 149–158. ISSN 0749-5471
- Chipman, Donald E.; Campbell, Randolph; Calvert, Robert (1970). The Dallas Cowboys and the NFL (Second Printing ed.). Norman, OK: University of Oklahoma Press. ISBN 978-0806109206.
- Clark, Emily; Gower, Patricia (2015). "'Well, Bless Your Heart!': Rhetoric and Power in Dallas Women during the Progressive Era". East Texas Historical Journal. 53 (1): 48–66.
- Cristol, Gerry (1998). A Light in the Prairie: Temple Emanu-El of Dallas, 1872–1997. Fort Worth, TX: TCU Press. ISBN 978-0875651842.
- Crowell, Gwinetta Malone. To Keep Those Red Lights Burning: Dallas' Response to Prostitution, 1874-1920. Master's thesis. University of Texas at Arlington (2010). online access
- Enstam, Elizabeth York (2002). "The Dallas Equal Suffrage Association, Political Style, and Popular Culture: Grassroots Strategies of the Woman Suffrage Movement, 1913–1919". The Journal of Southern History. 68 (4): 817–848. doi:10.2307/3069775. JSTOR 3069775. ISSN 0022-4642
- Enstam, Elizabeth York (1998). Women and the Creation of Urban Life: Dallas, Texas, 1843–1920. College Station, TX: Texas A&M University Press. ISBN 978-0890967997.
- Fairbanks, Robert B (1999). "Rethinking Urban Problems: Planning, Zoning, and City Government in Dallas, 1900–1930". Journal of Urban History. 25 (6): 809–837. doi:10.1177/009614429902500602. ISSN 0096-1442
- Fairbanks, Robert B. (1998). For the City as a Whole: Planning, Politics, and the Public Interest in Dallas, Texas, 1900–1965. Columbus, OH: Ohio State University Press. ISBN 978-0814207994.
- Gower, Patricia Ellen. "Dallas: Experiments in Progressivism, 1898-1919." PhD dissertation Texas A. & M. U. 1996. 228 pp. DAI 1997 58(1): 263-A. DA9718350 Fulltext: ProQuest Dissertations & Theses
- Graff, Harvey J (2008). The Dallas Myth: The Making and Unmaking of an American City. Minneapolis: University of Minnesota Press. ISBN 978-0816652693. excerpt and text search
- Hazel, Michael V., ed. (1995). Dallas Reconsidered: Essays in Local History. Three Forks Printing. ISBN 978-0963762931.
- Hazel, Michael V (2001). The Dallas Public Library: Celebrating a Century of Service, 1901–2001. Denton, TX: University of North Texas Press. ISBN 9781574411416.
- Hill, Patricia Evridge (1996). Dallas: The Making of a Modern City. Austin: University of Texas Press. ISBN 978-0292731042. the standard scholarly history
- Hill-Aiello, Thomas A. "Dallas, Cotton and the Transatlantic Economy, 1885-1956." PhD dissertation U. of Texas, Arlington 2006. 326 pp. DAI 2007 67(9): 3555-A. DA3229563 Fulltext: ProQuest Dissertations & Theses
- McElhaney, Jacquelyn Masur (1998). Pauline Periwinkle and Progressive Reform in Dallas. College Station: University of Texas A&M Press. ISBN 978-0890968000.
- Mims, Dennis M. "A Queer History of Dallas: the Formation, Development, and Integration of Big D's LGBT Community, 1965-2005" (PhD. Diss. U Texas-Dallas 2019) online.
- Minutaglio, Bill; Davis, Steven L. (2013). Dallas 1963. New York: Twelve. ISBN 978-1455522095. excerpt; on the political environment of an assassination
- Ofman, May Walters. "The Practice of Social Welfare: A Case Study in Dallas, Texas, 1890-1929." (PhD dissertation U. of Michigan 1999. 456 pp. DAI 2000 60(7): 2650-A. DA9938505 Fulltext: ProQuest Dissertations & Theses
- Payne, Darwin (1999). As Old as Dallas Itself: A History of Lawyers in Dallas, the Dallas Bar Associations, and the City They Helped Build. Three Forks Press. ISBN 978-1893451018.
- Portz, Kevin G. (2015). "Political Turmoil in Dallas: The Electoral Whipping of the Dallas County Citizens League by the Ku Klux Klan, 1922". Southwestern Historical Quarterly. 119 (2): 148–177. doi:10.1353/swh.2015.0076. JSTOR 26432322.
- Tatman, Arthur T. "La Camara, 1939': a Mexican Chamber of Commerce Forms in Dallas." Journal of the West (2006) 45(4): 36–47. ISSN 0022-5169 online at ABC-CLIO
- Thometz, Carol Estes (2012). The Decision-Makers: The Power Structure of Dallas. Literary Licensing, LLC. ISBN 978-1258361068.
- Williams, Roy H.; Shay, Kevin James (1999). And Justice for All: The Untold History of Dallas. CGS Communications. ISBN 9780965050579. excerpt and text search

=== Race relations ===
- Behnken, Brian D. (2007). "The 'Dallas Way': Protest, Response, and the Civil Rights Experience in Big D and Beyond". Southwestern Historical Quarterly. 111: 1–29. doi:10.1353/swh.2007.0059. ISSN 0038-478X
- Decker, Stefanie. "Women in the Civil Rights Movement: Juanita Craft Versus the Dallas Elite." East Texas Historical Journal 2001 39(1): 33–42. ISSN 0424-1444
- Gower, Patricia E. "The Price of Exclusion: Dallas Municipal Policy and its Impact on African Americans." East Texas Historical Journal, 2001 39(1): 43–54. ISSN 0424-1444
- Lawe, Thedore M. (2008). "Racial politics in Dallas in the Twentieth Century". East Texas Historical Journal. 46 (2): 27–41.
- Linden, Glenn M. (1995). Desegregating Schools in Dallas. Three Forks Press. ISBN 978-0963762917.
- Morgan, Ruth P. Governance by Decree: The Impact of the Voting Rights Act in Dallas. University Press of Kansas, 2004. 326 pp.
- Phillips, Michael (2006). White Metropolis: Race, Ethnicity, and Religion in Dallas, 1841–2001. Austin: University of Texas Press. ISBN 0-292-71274-X.
- Prior, Marsha, and Robert V. Kemper. "From Freedman's Town to Uptown: Community Transformation and Gentrification in Dallas, Texas," Urban Anthropology and Studies of Cultural Systems and World Economic Development, Vol. 34, 2005
- Schutze, Jim (2021). The Accommodation: The Politics of Race in an American City (Second ed.). Dallas: La Reunion. ISBN 978-1646050963. excerpt

=== Historiography and memory ===
- Behnken, Brian D. "The Southwestern Historical Quarterly and the State of Civil Rights History in Texas." Southwestern Historical Quarterly 125.4 (2022): 482–494. excerpt

== Online resources ==
- Handbook of Texas Online (2008), with many articles about Dallas-related people and topics
- Levinthal, Dave (2009), Group seeks road to be named after Gandhi, archived from the original on 2011-10-27
- Lost Dallas - by D Magazine
