= History of Dallas (1975–1985) =

The history of Dallas, Texas, United States, from 1975 to 1985 concerns the real estate boom.

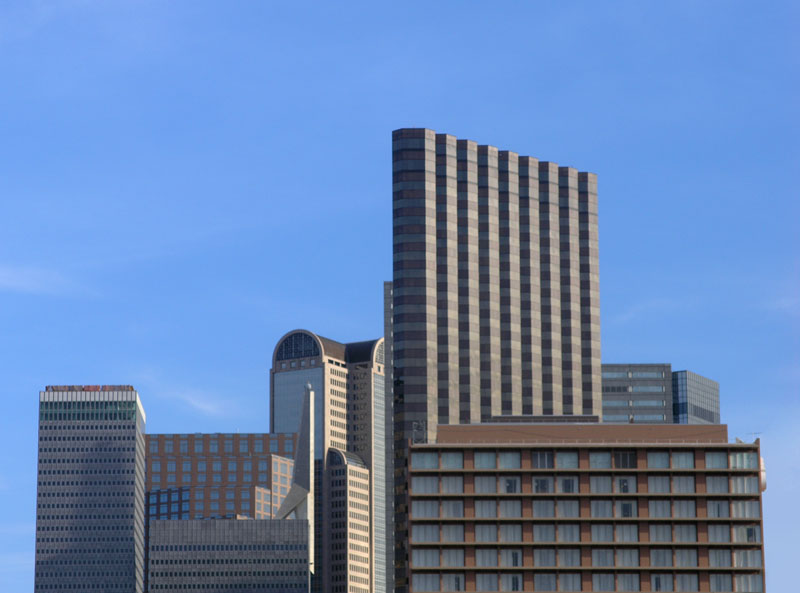
Every structure shown here was built during this period, along with dozens of others

In the late 1970s and early to mid-1980s, Dallas underwent the building boom which produced a distinctive contemporary profile for the downtown area and a prominent skyline, influenced by nationally acclaimed architects. By the 1980s, when the oil industry mostly relocated to Houston, Dallas was beginning to benefit from a burgeoning technology boom (driven by the growing computer and telecom industries), while continuing to be a center of banking and business. In 1983, voters in Dallas and area cities approved the creation of Dallas Area Rapid Transit to replace the Dallas Transit System. In 1984, the Dallas Museum of Art moved from Fair Park as one of the first buildings in downtown's Arts District. Also in 1984, the Republican National Convention was held in Dallas. In 1985, at the peak of the real estate boom, the 72-story Bank of America Plaza (then InterFirst Plaza) opened as the tallest building in Dallas. From the mid-to-late 1980s, many banks, especially in Dallas, collapsed during the Savings and Loan crisis, nearly destroying the city's economy and scrapping plans for hundreds of structures.
