= Elaine D. and Charles A. Sammons Park =

Public park in Dallas, Texas

- Interactive map of Elaine D. and Charles A. Sammons Park
- Type: public park
- Location: Dallas, Texas
- Coordinates: 32°47′25″N 96°47′51″W
- Area: 10-acre (40,000 m^{2})
- Created: 2009
- Operator: City of Dallas
- Open: All year
- Public transit: M-Line: Olive & Flora
- Website: Dallas Center for the Performing Arts website

The Elaine D. and Charles A. Sammons Park is a public park in the new AT&T Performing Arts Center, located in the Arts District of downtown Dallas, Texas (USA). The park opened on October 12, 2009, and weaves together the Margot and Bill Winspear Opera House, the Dee and Charles Wyly Theatre, Annette Strauss Artist Square and City Performance Hall. It includes canopies of mature trees, large expanses of grass and a series of gardens, reflecting pools, promenades and walkways.

Designed by landscape architect Michel Desvigne of Paris in collaboration with JJR of Chicago, it is named for Sammons Enterprises, Inc., who donated $15 million to the Center.
