= Robert Folsom =

American politician (1927–2017)

51st Mayor of Dallas
- In office 1976–1981
- Preceded by: Adlene Harrison
- Succeeded by: Jack Evans

Personal details
- Born: February 15, 1927 Dallas, Texas, U.S.
- Died: January 24, 2017 (aged 89) Dallas, Texas, U.S.
- Spouse: Margaret Folsom (deceased)
- Education: Southern Methodist University
- Profession: real estate developer

Robert Folsom (February 15, 1927 – January 24, 2017) was mayor of Dallas from 1976 until 1981. His power base was in Dallas' business establishment.

== Early life and education ==
Robert Folsom grew up in the Oak Cliff district of Dallas. He attended Sunset High School where he was a standout athlete and student. After high school, Folsom attended The United States Military Academy in West Point, NY where he played football and basketball for the Cadets. During his time at the academy, Folsom played in two "Games of the Century" 1945 vs. Navy and 1946 vs. Notre Dame. President Truman attended the game against Navy. Playing against Michigan in Yankee Stadium in 1945, Folsom caught a touchdown pass. During his time at Army, Folsom was a part of two national championship teams. After two years at West Point, Folsom transferred back to his hometown University, Southern Methodist University. He would go on to be the only four sport letter winner in the history of the school (Football, Basketball, Track and Baseball). He is also one of the only college football players to have played alongside three Heisman Trophy Winners (Glenn Davis, Doc Blanchard, and Doak Walker), as well against two others, (Johnny Lujack and Leon Hart)

Folsom along with fellow 1949 SMU Captains Doak Walker (37) and Dick Mckissack (38)

== Business career ==
Folsom is a "legendary investor and developer....who built a fortune as a master of real estate[.]" He chairs the board of directors of real estate development firm Folsom Properties, Inc. Since the early 1980s he has served on the boards of directors of BeautiControl Cosmetics, Inc. and Alcatel USA, Inc. (formerly DSC Communications Corporation); he also serves on the board of the Cox School of Business at Southern Methodist University. He was also chairman of the Board of Trustees of the Dallas Independent School District and chairman of the Board of Methodist Hospital of Dallas. He received the Hugh Prather Award for his real estate leadership and the Oak Cliff Lions Club Humanitarian Award for Service to his community. Folsom is a Member of the Sunset High School Hall of Fame.

== Dallas Chaparrals ==
Folsom started and owned the Dallas Chaparrals, the Dallas ABA team, with a group of other Dallas businessman. From 1967 to 1971, the team played in Dallas as one of the original 11 ABA teams. In 1971, Folsom leased the team to Red McCombs for a dollar for the season and then sold the team the following year to McCombs for $725,000. McCombs would turn the team into the San Antonio Spurs.

== Tenure as mayor ==
Folsom was elected mayor of Dallas in April 1976, in a special election held to replace Wes Wise, who had resigned in order to run for Congress. He served as mayor until 1981. During his time, he headed up several successful projects including: the tollway, Reunion Arena, and the Dallas Arts District

== Death ==
Folsom died on January 24, 2017, at his home in Dallas.
