= Annette Strauss =

American politician from Texas

54th Mayor of Dallas
- In office May 4, 1987 – December 2, 1991
- Preceded by: Starke Taylor
- Succeeded by: Steve Bartlett

Personal details
- Born: Annette Louise Greenfield; January 26, 1924 Houston, Texas, U.S.
- Died: December 14, 1998 (aged 74)
- Resting place: Sparkman-Hillcrest Memorial Park Cemetery
- Spouse: Ted Strauss
- Relations: Robert S. Strauss (brother-in-law)
- Education: University of Texas at Austin (BA); Columbia University

Annette Louise Greenfield Strauss (January 26, 1924 – December 14, 1998) was an American philanthropist and politician who served as the 54th mayor of Dallas. The Annette Strauss Artist Square in the Arts District of downtown Dallas, Texas is named in honor of her. She was the second female mayor and the second Jewish mayor of Dallas (Adlene Harrison was first; Laura Miller was the third). She was also the first woman elected to the post in her own right; Harrison served as a caretaker for the last months of Wes Wise's term after Wise resigned to run for Congress.

== Life ==
Born in Houston, Texas, Annette Strauss graduated from the University of Texas at Austin in 1944. She moved to New York City where she received master's degrees in sociology and psychology from Columbia University. She was a member of Phi Beta Kappa honor society and Alpha Epsilon Phi sorority. She worked as a Red Cross social worker in Houston for a year until she married Ted Strauss, Sr. Managing Director of Bear Stearns, in 1946 and moved to Dallas in 1947.

During the 1960s and 1970s, Strauss worked tirelessly as a fundraiser for various charities and organizations and also as a volunteer for a number of other organizations. She worked on behalf of the Dallas Symphony, the Crystal Charity Ball, Southern Methodist University, the United Way of America, the United Jewish Appeal, the Dallas Black Dance Theatre, Baylor University Medical Center and many other groups. Her efforts helped to raise millions for the arts in Dallas. Strauss was also one of the founding members of the Volunteer Center of North Texas.

Using her many connections in the city, Strauss was elected to a Dallas City Council seat in 1983. She became deputy mayor pro tem and then mayor pro tem in 1984. In 1987, Strauss ran for mayor of Dallas and won with 56 percent of the vote. Her opponents included the Texas Republican state chairman, Fred Meyer, a Dallas businessman originally from suburban Chicago.

During her tenure as mayor, Strauss helped to lead a city suffering from a sharp economic downturn.

While Mayor-Pro Tem, Annette spearheaded the effort to build a refuge for an increasing number of families living on the streets, victims of the collapsed Texas economy. The vision was a facility where homeless families could stay together as a family unit. A coalition of congregations responded, and Family Gateway was born. Originally named the Downtown Family Shelter, the S. St. Paul, 30-room facility was rededicated as the Annette. G. Strauss Family Gateway Center in 2000. The Center provides a private room, food and clothing for homeless families with children; coupled with the child care, educational and employment resources they need to recover from crisis and make positive choices for their future. Today, Family Gateway has grown to include transitional housing and permanent supportive housing units in the community to serve the growing number of homeless families. After 25 years Annette's original vision for Family Gateway continues today; to empower homeless families to break the cycle of homelessness and embrace a life of hope and promise.

In 1991, Strauss left the mayoral position and worked as a consultant and trustee for a number of boards and foundations, including the Children's Medical Center Foundation, the Dallas Methodist Hospitals Foundation, the St. Paul Hospital Foundation, the Timberlawn Foundation and the Texas Historical Foundation. She was also appointed "Ambassador-at-large" for the city of Dallas, an honorary position she held until her death from cancer in 1998. She was interred at Sparkman-Hillcrest Memorial Park Cemetery. Her husband Ted Strauss died on September 5, 2014.

== Awards ==
Strauss was awarded the H. Neil Mallon Award by the World Affairs Council in 1995. The H. Neil Mallon Award, hosted by the World Affair Council of Dallas/ Fort Worth, is presented annually to individuals who have excelled at promoting the international focus of North Texas. The prestigious Mallon Award is named after the Council’s founder and is presented annually to individuals who have excelled in promoting our region’s international profile. Funds raised from this event support the World Affair Council’s public and education programming, international exchanges, and diplomatic services.

== Legacy ==
In recognition of her many years of humanitarian service, many things have been named for Annette Strauss, including the Annette G. Strauss Family Gateway Center, the Annette Strauss Institute for Civic Life at the University of Texas at Austin and also the Annette Strauss Artist Square, an open-air Performing Arts area in downtown Dallas.

Political offices
Preceded by Starke Taylor	Mayor of Dallas; 1987-1991	Succeeded by Steve Bartlett
