= Jack Wilson Evans =

American politician

52nd Mayor of Dallas
- In office April 1981 – 1983
- Preceded by: Robert Folsom
- Succeeded by: Starke Taylor

Personal details
- Born: August 13, 1922
- Died: June 5, 1997 (aged 74)
- Resting place: Sachse, Texas
- Party: Republican
- Spouse: Imogene Sachse Evans
- Children: 3
- Education: Southern Methodist University
- Occupation: Various

Military service
- Branch/service: United States Army Air Corps
- Years of service: 1944-1947

Jack Wilson Evans (August 13, 1922 – June 5, 1997) was an American grocer and politician who served as mayor of Dallas, Texas.

== Biography ==
Working from his youth in grocery stores in Dallas, Jack Evans joined the Army Air Corps in 1944. Upon returning to Dallas in 1947, he began Evans Lakewood Food Mart at the site of a previously closed Safeway store. He joined Cullum Companies, which operated several grocery brands including Tom Thumb stores (now a part of Safeway) in Dallas, in 1966 and eventually became the chairman and CEO of the company in 1986. Evans went to college at Southern Methodist University. He graduated from Woodrow Wilson High School (Dallas) in 1940.

Norman Brinker, who owned or founded such restaurant chains as Chili's and Steak & Ale, reported Evans loaned him the money to open his third Steak & Ale restaurant in 1968, a key step to the eventual success of Brinker's restaurant empire.

Evans was kidnapped in February 1978 at the Tom Thumb Corporate Headquarters but escaped when the kidnappers went to collect the $100,000 ransom given by one of his sons, Roy Gene Evans.

=== Political career ===
Evans was elected mayor of Dallas in April 1981, collecting 72% of the vote while running against seven other candidates. In a city often suffering from racial and class divisions, Evans strove to be an inclusive mayor. He received criticism for being the first mayor to address a gay and lesbian organization, the Dallas Gay Alliance. The Dallas Morning News reported he told the group, "I'm one who accepts people for what they are, and I want you to make the most of what you are" and that he supported hiring gay police officers and firefighters. After receiving criticism from constituents and other city officials (homosexuality was illegal in Texas at the time), he retracted his support for hiring gay officers.

While mayor, he also acquired the land and spurred development for the future Dallas Arts District and led the coalition to attract the 1984 Republican National Convention to the city. In 1982 he founded the Dallas Mayor's committee for the employment of people with disabilities. His goal was to make Dallas a model city for the entire world. He added new and improved technology to the Police Department, looked more into urban crimes, and reinstated the Police Awards Banquet. Evans also made plans for a Dallas Police Memorial. Evans served one term and did not run for re-election in 1983, choosing to return to his previous position with Cullum Companies.

=== Post-mayoral work ===
He continued to work in a civic capacity in Dallas and the surrounding area after completing his mayoral term, serving as the executive director of Dallas Area Rapid Transit (DART) in 1992, as the chairman of the Dallas/Fort Worth International Airport Board, and on the boards of numerous local companies including Texas Utilities and Brinker International. In 1989, he was inducted into the Hall of Fame of his alma mater, Woodrow Wilson High School in Dallas.

=== Death ===
Evans died at his home in 1997 after a long bout with colon cancer, survived by his wife Imogene Sachse Evans, his three sons, Roy Gene Evans, Craig Evans, and Jack Evans Jr. and their families. He is buried in Sachse, Texas. He was given the Henry Cohn Humanitarian award before he died.

In 2000, a section of Fairmount Street in downtown Dallas, which runs through the Arts District he helped create, was renamed Jack Evans Street. In March 2003, the new headquarters of the Dallas Police Department was completed. It is named the Jack Evans Police Headquarters in honor of the former mayor.
