= Starke Taylor =

American mayor

53rd Mayor of Dallas
- In office 1983–1987
- Preceded by: Jack Wilson Evans
- Succeeded by: Annette Strauss

Personal details
- Born: Austin Starke Taylor Jr. July 2, 1922 Paris, Texas, U.S.
- Died: October 27, 2014 (aged 92) Dallas, Texas, U.S.
- Party: Republican
- Spouse(s): Delores Myrlee Burris, Carolyn Wray Norman Markle
- Education: Rice University
- Occupation: Cotton investor

Military service
- Allegiance: United States
- Branch/service: United States Navy
- Years of service: World War II

Austin Starke Taylor Jr. (July 2, 1922 – October 27, 2014) was mayor of Dallas, Texas, from 1983 to 1987, and a cotton investor.

== Biography ==
Taylor was born on July 2, 1922, in Paris, Texas, in Lamar County to Austin Starke Taylor Sr. and Veryl Georgette Lamb. He married Delores Myrlee Burris, daughter of Clarke E. Burris on August 29, 1942, in Durant, Oklahoma. They had three children: Austin Starke III, Janet Charlene, and Charles Claiborne. He and Mrs. Taylor divorced in 1973. He married Carolyn Wray Norman Markle on April 7, 1973, in Dallas.

Starke Taylor graduated from Highland Park High School in 1939 where he was editor of the yearbook. In 1943 he graduated from Rice University, at the time called Rice Institute. While there he was elected president of the sophomore class.

He served in the Navy during World War II. His father, Starke Taylor Sr., was involved in buying and selling cotton and served a term as mayor of Highland Park. Stark Taylor Jr. joined his father's firm in 1946 and assumed control when is father retired in 1962. He sold the firm in 1982.

He served on the Parks and Recreation Board under Jack Evans. He defeated City Councilman and former Mayor Wes Wise in an election where he outspent the other candidate 10 to 1. In his 1985 re-election campaign, he defeated Max Goldblatt.

Starke Taylor Jr., CEO, Taylor Investments was on the 2012 AT&T College Bowl Board. He was also president of the Cotton Council International.

== Death ==
Taylor died at his home in Dallas on October 27, 2014.

Political offices
Preceded by Jack Wilson Evans	Mayor of Dallas; 1983-1987	Succeeded by Annette Strauss
