= Klyde Warren Park =

Public park in Dallas, Texas, U.S.

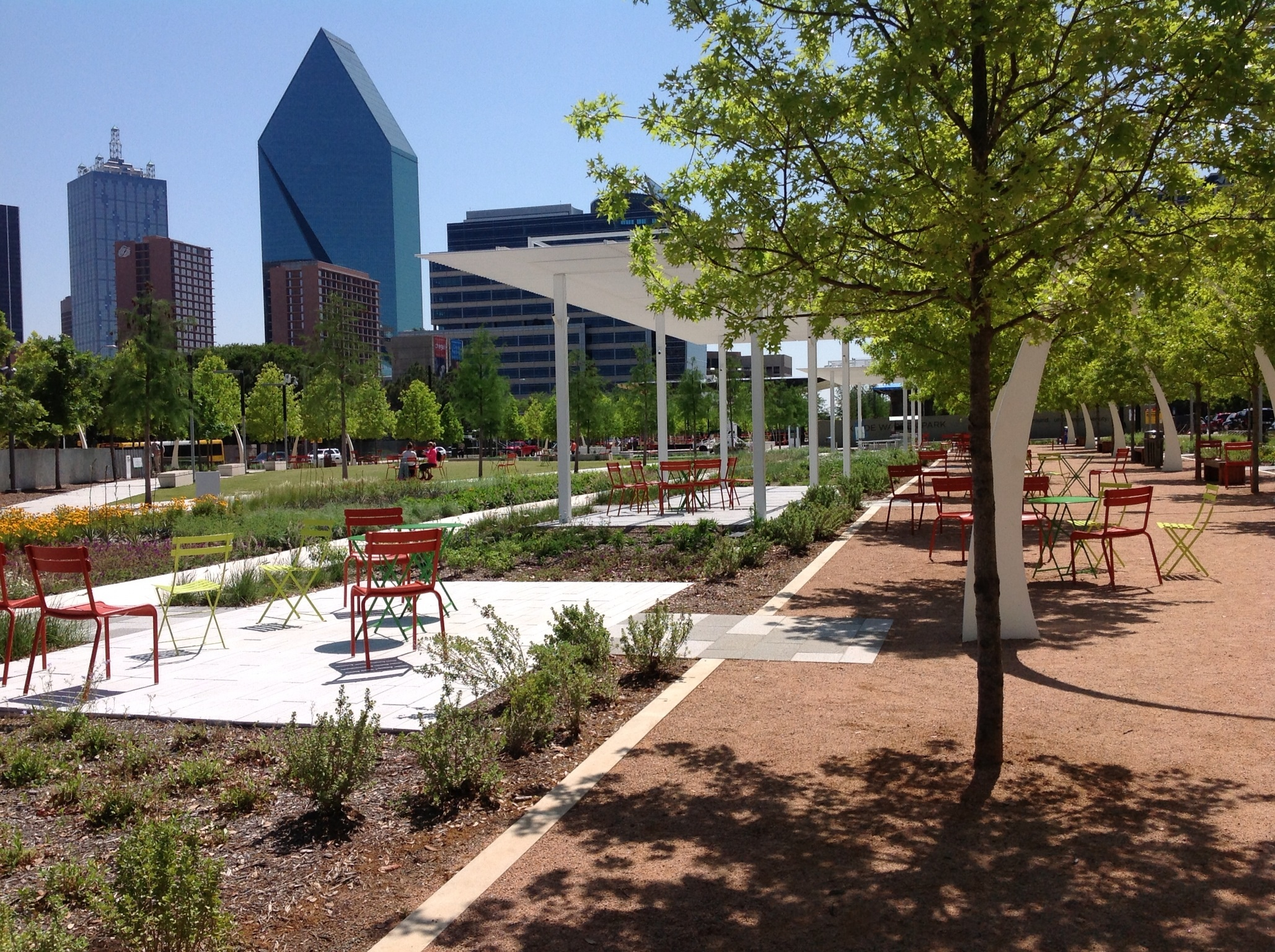
- Klyde Warren Park over the Woodall Rodgers Freeway, connecting Downtown and Uptown.
- Interactive map of Klyde Warren Park
- Type: Public Park
- Location: Downtown Dallas, Texas, U.S.
- Coordinates: 32°47′22″N 96°48′06″W
- Area: 5.4-acre (22,000 m^{2})
- Created: October 27, 2012; 14 years ago
- Operator: Woodall Rodgers Park Foundation
- Status: Open
- Public transit: M-Line: St Paul & McKinney, KWP/Arts District
- Website: http://www.klydewarrenpark.org

Klyde Warren Park is a 5.4-acre (2.2 ha) public park in Downtown Dallas, Texas, United States. The park is over the Woodall Rodgers Freeway, and opened in 2012. It is named for Klyde Warren, the young son of billionaire Kelcy Warren who donated $10 million to the development of the park.

The urban park is open to the public, but is operated by the private Woodall Rodgers Park Foundation. Unlike other public parks within the city, Klyde Warren Park has operating hours from 6am to 11pm.

== Description ==
The park is constructed above a section of below-grade Woodall Rodgers Freeway, for three blocks between Pearl Street and St. Paul Street. It connects the Dallas Arts District to other areas and serves as a central public gathering space for Dallas residents and visitors to enjoy.

Designed by landscape architecture firm The Office of James Burnett, the park includes a mix of active and passive spaces like children's parks and reading spaces, fountains, game areas, and dog parks. A 6,000-square-foot (560 m^{2}) restaurant and performance stage, designed by Thomas Phifer and Partners, is in the center of the park.

=== Location ===
The park is located on the edge of the Arts District, between Downtown Dallas and Uptown. The urban park stretches for three city blocks between Pearl and St. Paul Streets, and covers the below-grade Woodall Rodgers Freeway. The park connects with the M-Line Trolley.

Adjacent structures include the Dallas Museum of Art, Nasher Sculpture Center, AT&T Performing Arts Center, Morton H. Meyerson Symphony Center, Parkside Condominiums, Ritz-Carlton Hotel and Residences, and several commercial offices. Museum Tower, a 42-story residential tower, is also located next to the park.

=== Construction and management ===
The idea of a park had been discussed for many years, until a 2004 feasibilty grant provided the first concrete progress towards making the park a reality.

Utility construction began in January 2009, with a "ground-making" ceremony held in September 2009. The park opened on October 27, 2012. In 2022, the 95-foot-high Nancy Best Fountain opened in the park. In 2026, plans for a $200 million, 1.7-acre expansion were announced, westward to Akard Street.

The complex design was led by two design firms, landscape architecture by The Office of James Burnett, and structural engineering by the Jacobs Engineering Group, Inc. The design and construction of the park was managed by Bjerke Management Solutions. The head engineer on file is Mir Hadi Ali, P.E. from Jacobs Engineering Group, Inc.

Construction of the park was funded through a public, private partnership including $20 million in bond funds from the city of Dallas, $20 million in highway funds from the state and federal government through TxDOT, and nearly $50 million from private donations. The biggest contributor was businessman Kelcy Warren who gave $10 million to the project; the gift gave him naming rights which he used to name the park after his then-nine-year-old son. In March 2009, the park was selected to receive $16.7 million in funds from the American Recovery and Reinvestment Act of 2009 that were specifically for transportation enhancement construction.

Klyde Warren Park is privately managed and programmed by the Woodall Rodgers Park Foundation. The park's amenities and 1,300 annual events and programming are paid for by private donations being raised by the Woodall Rodgers Park Foundation. The Woodall Rodgers Park Foundation continues to raise donations to fund operations, programming, and construction of new amenities.

== Gallery ==
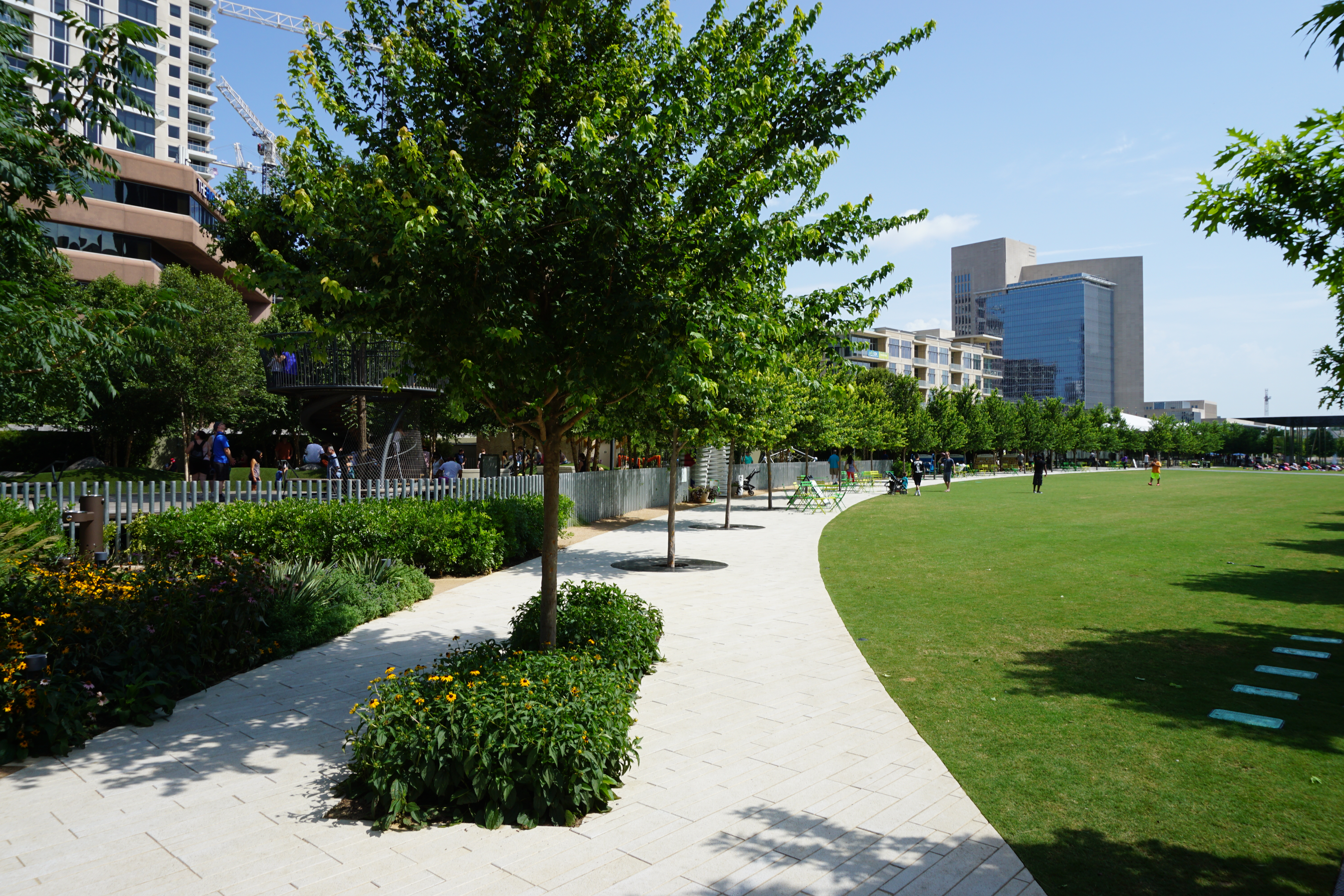
Path and the lawn inside the park

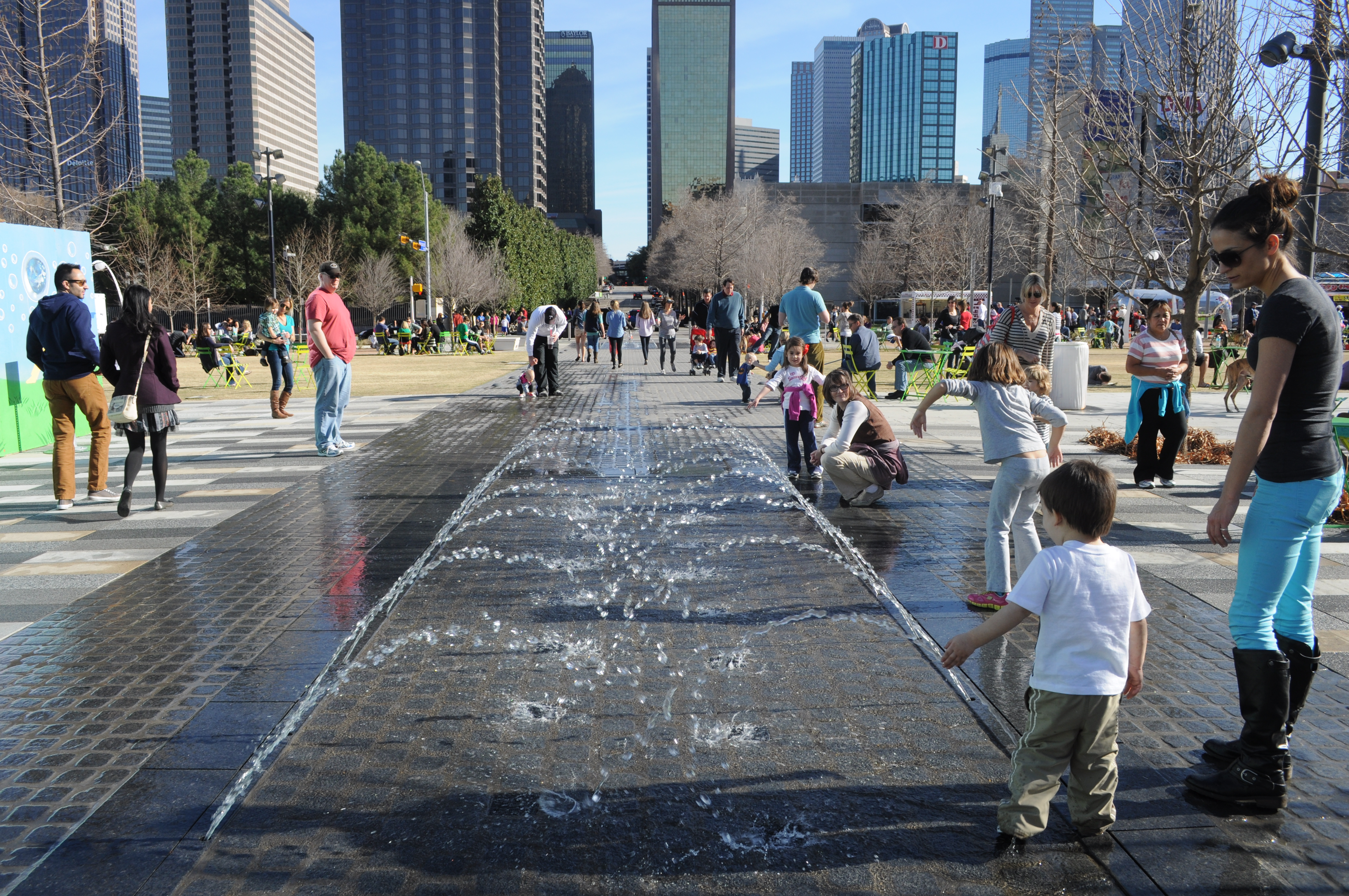
Play Fountain

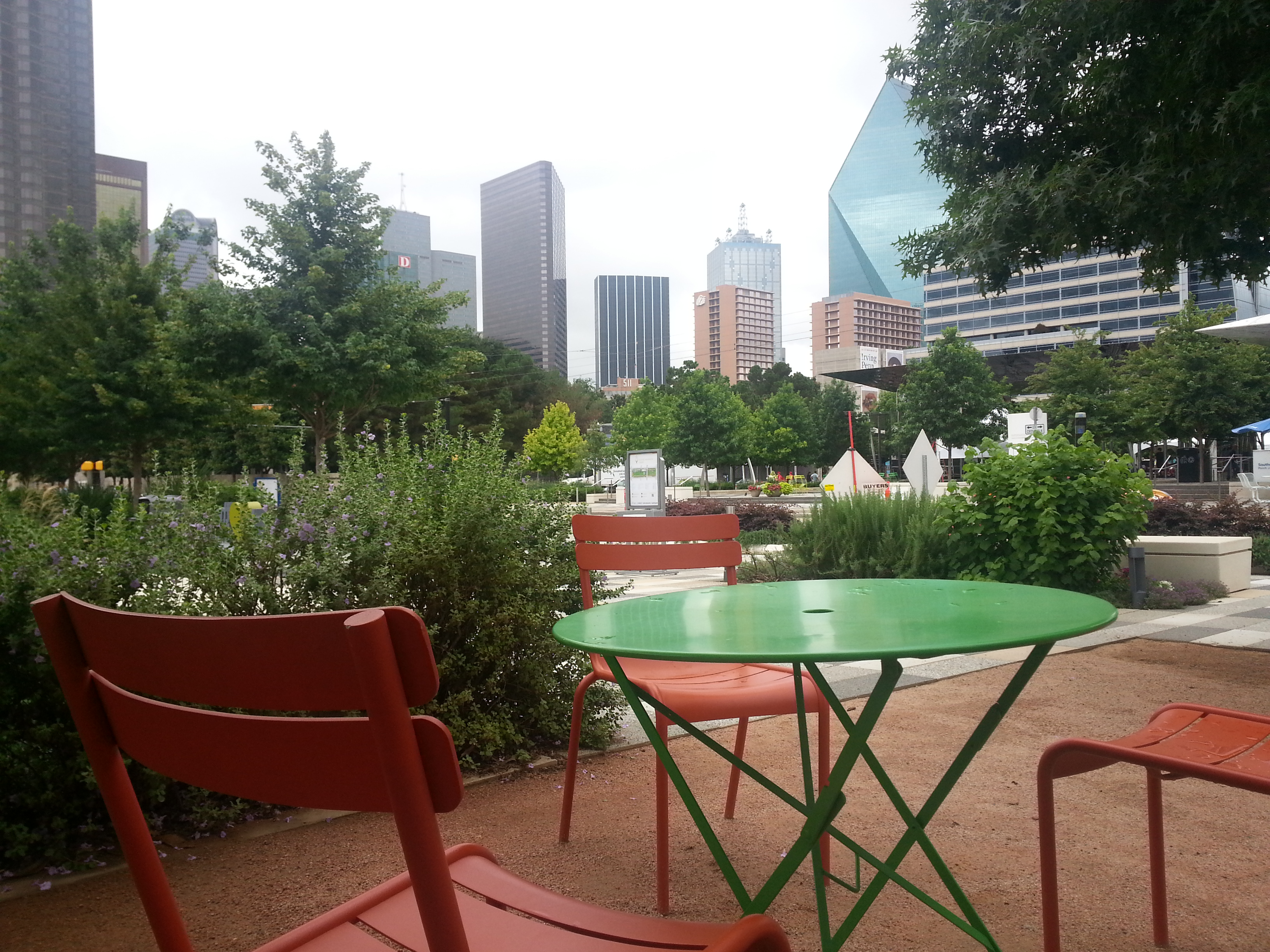
The vegetation and setting for Klyde Warren Park create an oasis among the soaring skyscrapers in downtown Dallas, TX

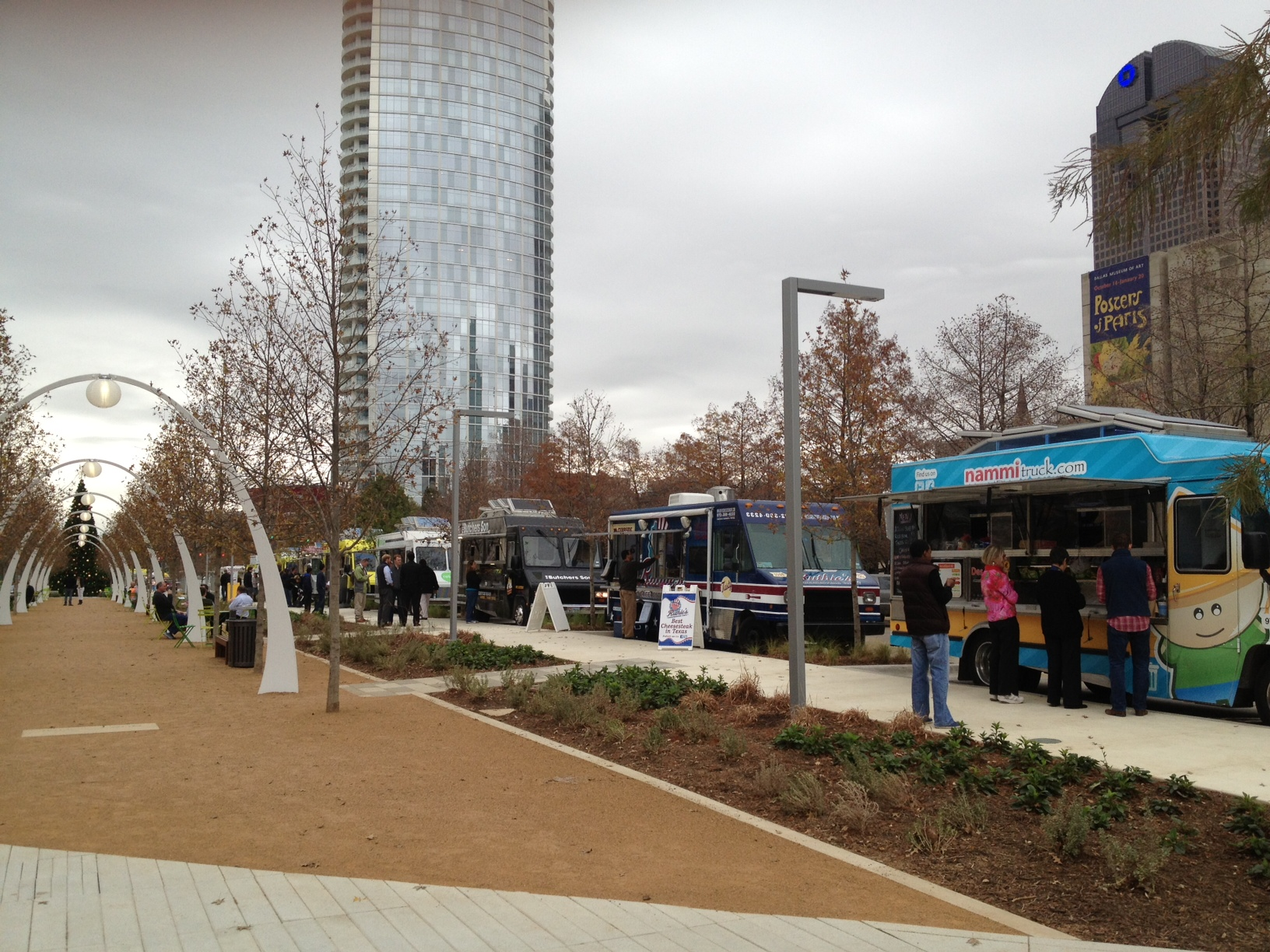
Klyde Warren Park, with a variety of food trucks that line the adjacent street

== See also ==
- Arts District, Dallas
- Parks in Dallas, Texas
