= Kevin Duncan =

American music producer

Kevin Duncan is an American music producer who has produced shows, concerts, recordings and events on Broadway and at concert halls around the world.

Duncan is closely associated with Paul Newman's SeriousFun Children's Network, formerly The Association of Hole in the Wall Camps, and its various camps within the network, including The Painted Turtle Camp and the Hole in the Wall Gang Camp, and works with them frequently to conceive and produce events. In early 2012, to launch the re-branding of the camps to the SeriousFun Children's Network, Duncan conceived and produced A Celebration of Paul Newman's Dream at Avery Fisher Hall, Lincoln Center. The event was hosted by Jake Gyllenhaal and featured performances by Paul Simon, Josh Groban, Elvis Costello and Trisha Yearwood, and appearances by Jimmy Fallon and Tina Fey.

Other events that Duncan has conceived and produced for the SeriousFun organization, such as the productions of Ernest Hemingway's and Aaron Copland's “The World of Nick Adams,” have received the support of the likes of Robert Redford, Julia Roberts, Bette Midler, Jerry Seinfeld, James Taylor, Bill Clinton, Paul McCartney, Gwyneth Paltrow, Meryl Streep, Stevie Wonder, Bruce Willis, Jack Nicholson and Danny DeVito, among many others. With rock legend Lou Adler, Duncan has created and produced events such as “Singers and Songs Celebrate Tony Bennett's 80th " and a one-night-only tribute for the 35th anniversary of “The Rocky Horror Picture Show, " as well as the Los Angeles and San Francisco productions of "The World of Nick Adams."

Duncan also produced with Adler "You've Got a Friend... A Live Celebration of Carole King and Her Music" at the Dolby Theatre in Hollywood that included performances by Katy Perry, Alicia Keys, Darlene Love, Herb Alpert, Carole King, John Legend, Amy Grant, Jakob Dylan and Jesse McCartney and was hosted by Quincy Jones, Danny DeVito and Jack Nicholson.

In addition to shows to benefit SeriousFun Children's Network and its family of camps, Duncan is also involved with creating and producing numerous live productions and Broadway shows. Duncan created and produced a live tribute to Stephen Sondheim, “The Ladies Who Sing Sondheim," which was directed by John Doyle and starring Patti LuPone, Kristin Chenoweth, Laura Benanti and Barbara Cook. The following year's tribute to John Kander, “Everybody Loves a Winner, " featured performances by Bebe Neuwirth, David Hyde Pierce, Ben Vereen and Eartha Kitt. Wesport's next event, “Footlights and Film: A Celebration of the Great Musicals of Stage and Screen," hosted by Julia Roberts, featured Bernadette Peters and Angela Lansbury. 2011's production, “An Enchanted Evening, " was a tribute to Mary Rodgers and Richard Rodgers, featuring performances by Jane Krakowski, James Naughton, Kelli O’Hara, Judy Kuhn and Karen Ziemba with a special award presented by Stephen Sondheim.

For Elton John, Disney and BC/EFA Duncan produced “This is your Song: Broadway Sings Elton John " with performances by Broadway stars to honor Elton John's partnership with Disney. For Time magazine and BC/EFA, he created the series for Broadway, “The Playwright's the Thing, " which celebrated the works of playwrights Christopher Durang, Terrence McNally, Neil Simon and Wendy Wasserstein. With Tony, GRAMMY and Emmy Award-winning composer Cy Coleman, he produced the all-star cast reunion of “Sweet Charity" at Lincoln Center, directed by Gwen Verdon, and Terrence McNally's “A Joyous Christmas.”

With Betty Buckley, Duncan produced the SRO concert and CD, “Betty Buckley: An Evening at Carnegie Hall" with the American Symphony Orchestra conducted by Paul Gemignani. Also with Ms. Buckley, Duncan produced the 2002 GRAMMY- nominated “Betty Buckley: Live at the Donmar," shot and recorded at the Donmar Warehouse in London for the BBC as well as Ms. Buckley's previous two releases, “Heart to Heart " and the 15th Anniversary re-release of her first album.

Duncan produced the grand opening of the Dallas Center for the Performing Arts (AT&T Performing Arts Center). Duncan spearheaded a series of Gala Performances and conceived a compendium of gala productions, in order to highlight both the respective venues within the center, as well as to showcase the featured talent. One evening included musical theatre at the Winspear Opera House, directed by Tony Award-winning director John Doyle, with performances by Tony Award- winners Kristin Chenoweth, Patti LuPone, George Hearn and Billy Elliott: The Musical's original Broadway Billy, Kiril Kulish. The other two evenings were held in the Wyly Theatre and were directed by Pulitzer Prize and multi Tony Award-winning writer/ director James Lapine. The festivities included a pre-Broadway preview of Lapine's play Mrs. Miller Does Her Thing; a set by hip hop performance artist Will Power; and a performance with Allen Menken and friends, hosted by Greg Kinnear and Bruce Willis.

For several years, Duncan has presented the entertainment for the Washington Wines Festival, with talent that has included Vince Gill, Amy Grant, Lisa Loeb and Carole King.

Duncan is an active voting member of The National Academy of Recording Arts & Sciences.
