= Adlene Harrison =

American politician (1923–2022)

Mayor of Dallas
- Acting; 1976
- Preceded by: Wes Wise
- Succeeded by: Robert Folsom

Personal details
- Born: November 19, 1923 Dallas, Texas, U.S.
- Died: February 19, 2022 (aged 98) Dallas, Texas, U.S.
- Party: Democratic
- Education: University of Missouri

Adlene Nathanson Harrison (November 19, 1923 – February 19, 2022) was an American politician who served on the Dallas City Council from 1973 to 1977, and was acting mayor of Dallas in 1976. Harrison was elected as city councilwoman three times. She also served as regional administrator for the Environmental Protection Agency from 1977 to 1981 and as the first chair of the Dallas Area Rapid Transit Board. She was the first Jewish woman to serve as Mayor of a major U.S. city. She was Dallas' first Jewish mayor and first female mayor; Annette Strauss would follow her in both categories. Harrison, a Democratic city councilwoman, succeeded Wes Wise as mayor when he resigned to run for the United States Congress. Harrison was generally referred to as being a proponent for urban Populism. Her acting mayoral term had focuses in expanding her existing environmental policy work as well as seeking the growth of municipal historical preservation efforts. While Harrison seriously considered running for mayor in the following election cycle, she ultimately decided that her political efforts were needed elsewhere, such as in her following positions within Environmental Protection Agency. She served until the election of a new mayor, Robert Folsom, at the end of the year.

Harrison also was on the boards of several local civic organizations, including the Dallas Jewish Coalition and the Dallas Arboretum.

Harrison died on February 19, 2022, at the age of 98.
