= Volunteer Center of North Texas =

The Volunteer Center of North Texas (VCNT), founded in 1971, is a volunteer center in Dallas, Texas. It seeks to recruit volunteers to serve nonprofits and their clients in the North Texas area. The Volunteer Center is an affiliate of the HandsOn Network.

== History ==
The Volunteer Center of North Texas (VCNT) was founded in 1971 by Annette Strauss, Mitch Jericho, Jan Sanders, and Helen Boothman. When the Center first opened in 1971, it operated from an office in downtown Dallas. Several years later, thanks to the generosity of The Meadows Foundation, the Volunteer Center moved to the Wilson Historical District to an impressive, two-story building on Live Oak Street. The Volunteer Center was initially called the Dallas Voluntary Action Center and later renamed the Volunteer Center of Dallas County. The VCNT merged with the Tarrant and Collin County volunteer centers and became the Volunteer Center of North Texas.

== Programs and services ==
- Bank of America Student Leaders
- Community Service Restitution
- Corporate Services
- Donated Goods Program
- ExxonMobil Community Summer Jobs Program
- Hands At Work Corporate Employee Program
- HandsOn
- ServiceWorks!
- Youth Volunteer Corps (YVC) of North Texas
- VeriFYI

== Mass Care Task Force ==
In 2005, Hurricane Katrina brought more than 30,000 evacuees to North Texas and area nonprofits found that they were unable to meet the needs of those who migrated into the area. Launched in 2006, the Mass Care Task Force (MCTF) is a collaboration between the American Red Cross North Texas Region, the North Texas Food Bank, The Salvation Army DFW Metroplex Command, and the Volunteer Center of North Texas with the goal of preparing North Texas for disaster. The task force is currently working on funding for the relief plan and recruiting disaster volunteers.
