= Annette Strauss Square =

Outdoor performance facility in Dallas, Texas

- Artist Square, Annette Strauss Artist Square
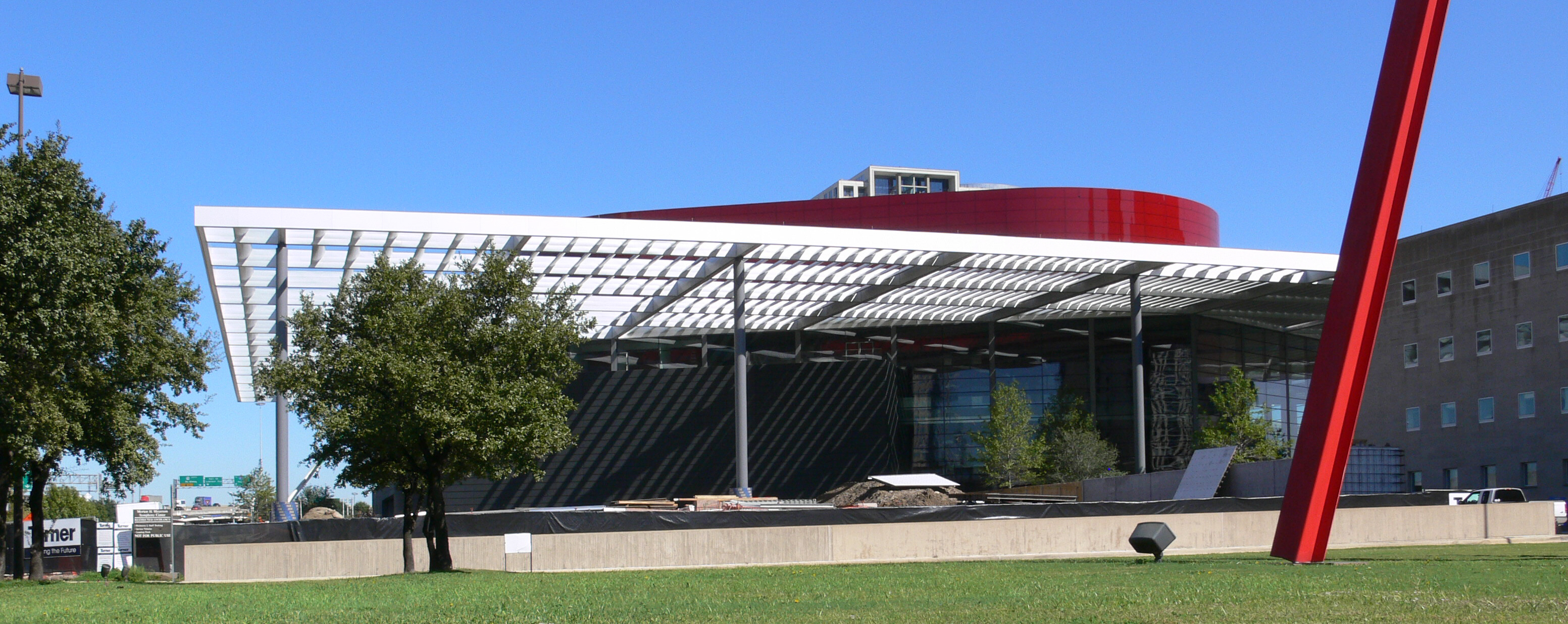
- Interactive map of Annette Strauss Square
- Address: Dallas Arts District; Dallas
- Coordinates: 32.790857°N 96.798703°W
- Capacity: 5,000
- Public transit: M-Line: Olive & Flora

Construction
- Opened: 1988
- Rebuilt: 2010
- Architect: Spencer de Grey

Website
- www.attpac.org

Annette Strauss Square is an 128,000 sq ft (11,900 m^{2}) outdoor performance facility in the AT&T Performing Arts Center, located in the Arts District of downtown Dallas, Texas (USA). It is the city's premier outdoor performing arts venue and a defining feature of the Elaine D. and Charles A. Sammons Park. Annette Strauss Square hosts a variety of outdoor events ranging from concerts to theatrical and dance performances to multi-day festivals, accommodating audiences of up to 5,000.

== History ==
Artist Square opened in 1989 as a 2-acre (8,100 m^{2}) lawn and performance pavilion constructed by the City of Dallas. The $1.8 million project, one of the early venues in the growing Arts District, was temporary in nature and built as a public forum for local visual and performing artists who couldn't afford more elaborate venues. It consisted of a main stage, sloping lawn and a smaller platform stage set in a grassy plaza. The original plan called for a black box theater and a small artists' compound containing galleries and studio space, but these were never completed. The site regularly drew 200,000 visitors each year to concerts, dance events and festivals.

In 1998 the facility was renamed "Annette Strauss Artist Square" for Annette Strauss, the late former Mayor of Dallas who was a passionate supporter of the arts and the Dallas Arts District.

As the AT&T Performing Arts Center took shape, a new permanent facility (designed by architectural firm Foster and Partners with Dallas based Good Fulton & Farrell serving as Architect of Record) was designed for the same general area. The original venue closed in 2005 and was rededicated "Annette Strauss Square" in the northwest corner of the new Center in September 2010.
