= Audelia, Dallas =

Coordinates: 32°54′34″N 96°43′04″W

Audelia
- Area
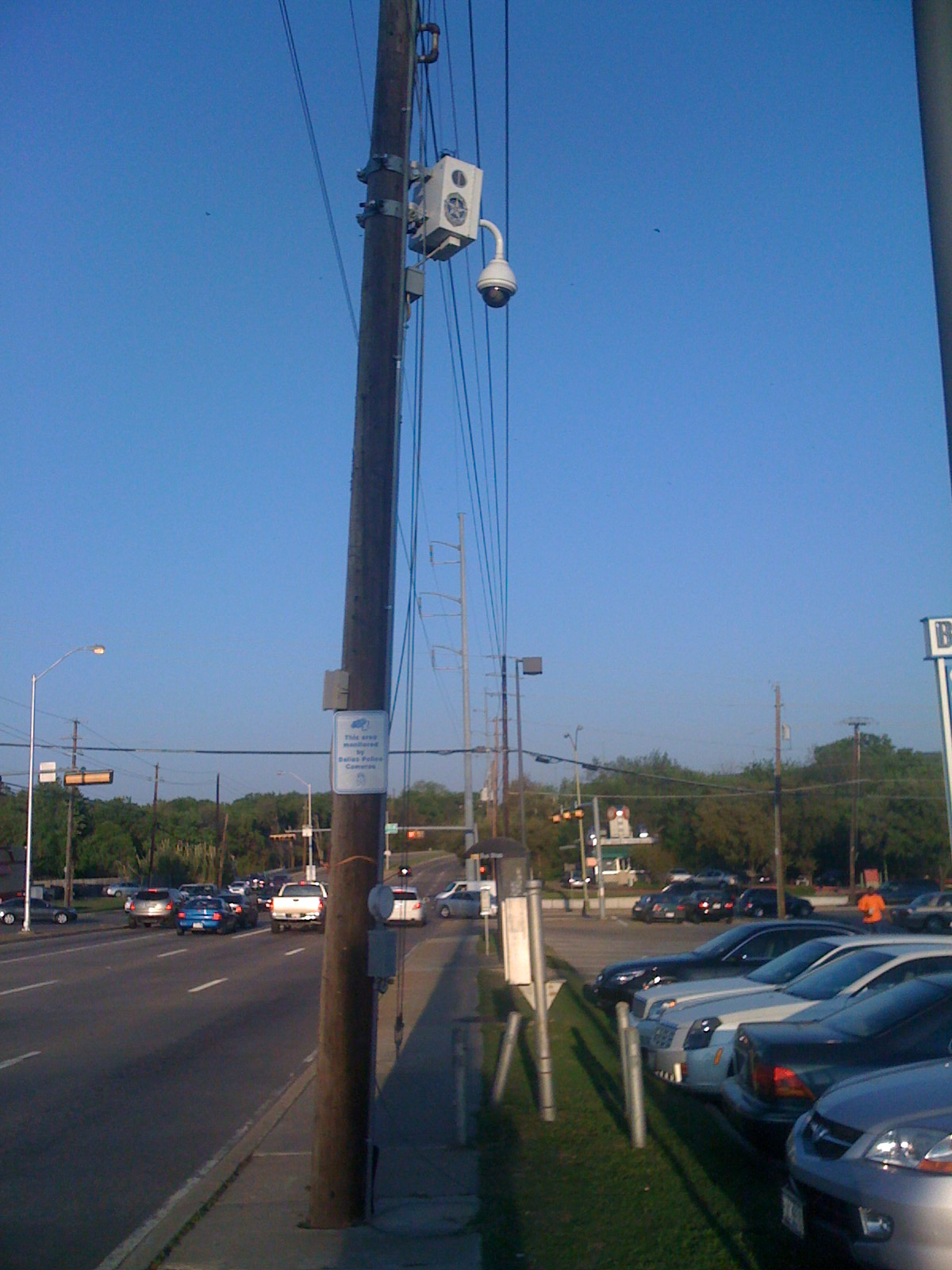
- Dallas Police Camera at Forest Lane and Audelia Road
- Interactive map of Audelia
- Country: United States
- State: Texas
- City: Dallas
- County: Dallas

Audelia is an area in Dallas, Texas, United States that used to be a distinct unincorporated community in Dallas County. The Audelia site is located three miles south of what is now Richardson.

By 1981 Audelia was within Dallas. The area is now part of the Lake Highlands area, sometimes being referred to as North Lake Highlands.
