= Margot and Bill Winspear Opera House =

Opera house in downtown Dallas, Texas

- Interactive map of Margot and Bill Winspear Opera House
- Address: Dallas Arts District'; Dallas
- Coordinates: 32.790822°N 96.797921°W
- Capacity: 2,300
- Type: Opera house
- Public transit: M-Line: Olive & Flora

Construction
- Opened: 2009
- Architects: Foster + Partners and Kendall/Heaton Associates, Inc.

Website
- attpac.org

The Margot and Bill Winspear Opera House is an opera house (one of four venues in the AT&T Performing Arts Center) located in the Arts District of downtown Dallas, Texas (USA).

Designed as a 21st-century reinterpretation of the traditional opera house, the Winspear seats 2,200 (with a capacity of 2,300) in a traditional horseshoe configuration.

The facility is the home of The Dallas Opera (which until the 2008/2009 season performed at the Music Hall at Fair Park) and the Texas Ballet Theater. The AT&T Performing Arts Center also produces original programming and partners with local and national organizations to present a wide range of other cultural performances at the venue. These offerings include music, dance, Broadway shows, concerts and lectures.

The Winspear Opera House includes the Nancy Hamon Education and Recital Hall, a space that can be used for smaller performances seating audiences up to 200, as well as classes, rehearsals, meetings and events.

== History ==
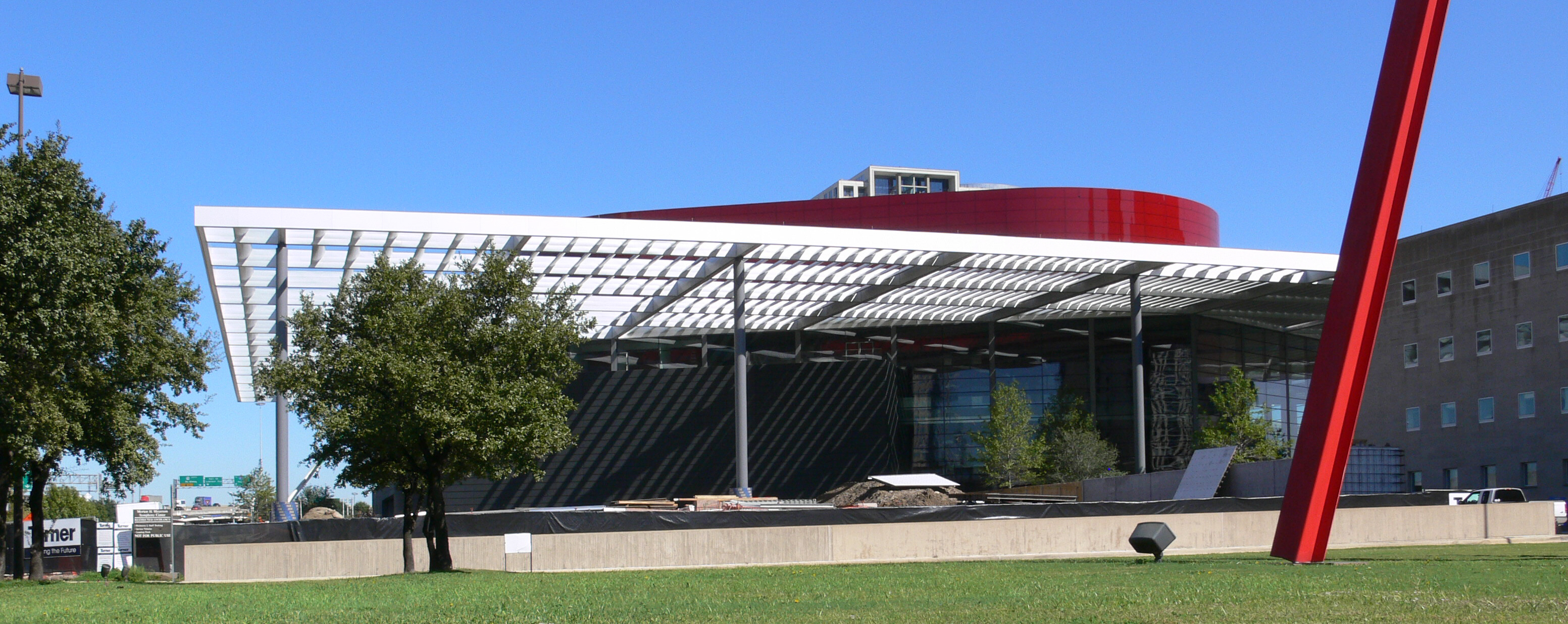
Western view of the Winspear Opera House. The Annette Strauss Artist Square will be housed under this section of the building's portico

Groundbreaking for the AT&T Performing Arts Center and Winspear Opera House was held in October 2006. The venue was designed by Foster and Partners (principal architect: Spencer de Grey) and made possible in part by a $42-million gift from Margot and Bill Winspear, for whom the facility is named. The London firm Sound Space Design (principal acoustician: Robert Essert) developed the acoustical design of the opera house and the acoustics were engineered specifically for performances of opera and musical theater. Theatre planning and theatre equipment design were by Theatre Projects Consultants. The stages were also equipped with appropriate flooring for performances of ballet and other forms of dance.

The opera house was presented to the public with tours and performances during the center's opening week, October 12 – 18, 2009. The first opera performance took place on October 23, 2009 with Verdi's Otello, conducted by Graeme Jenkins.

== Design features ==
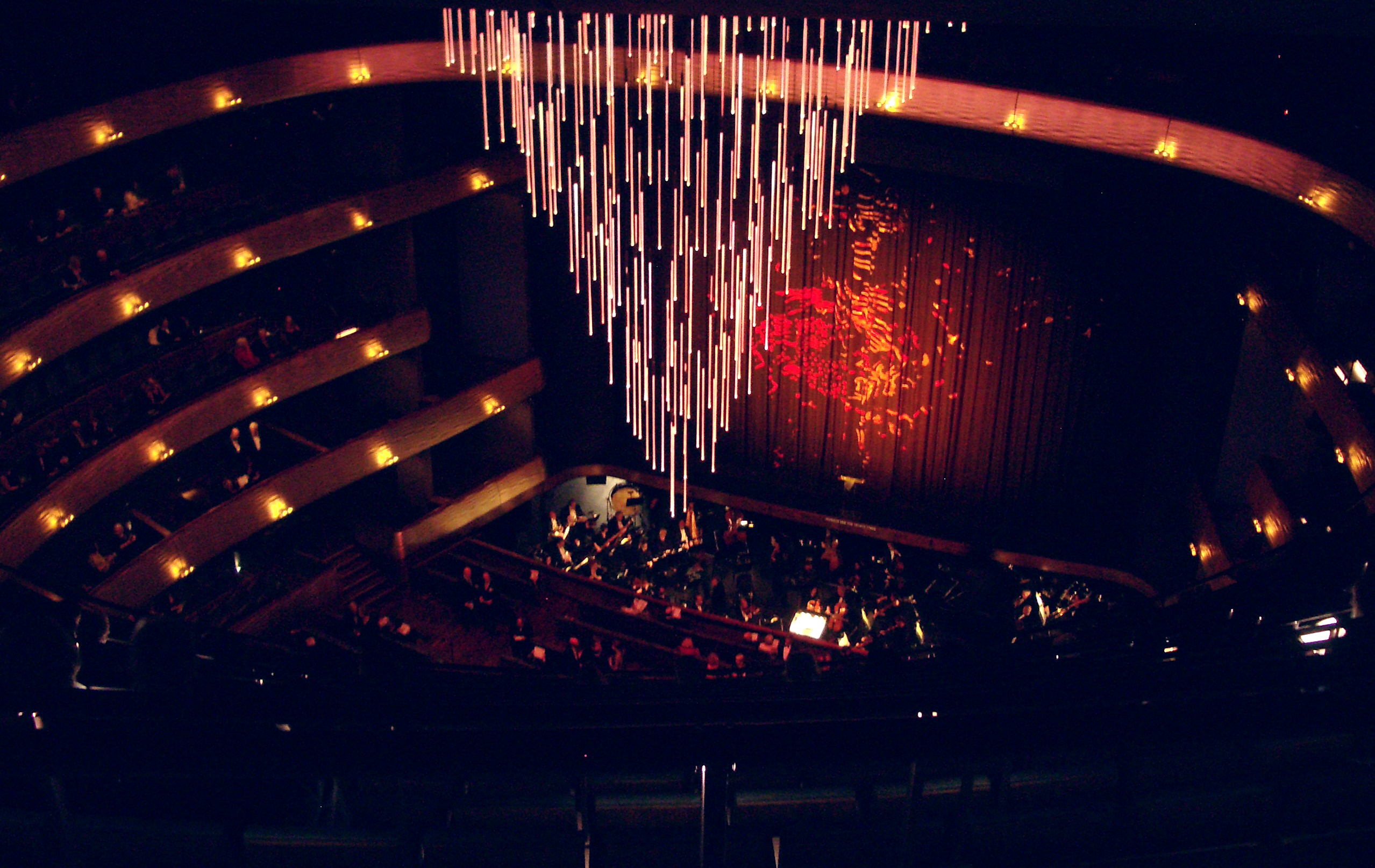
Auditorium and chandelier during opening night

The Annette and Harold Simmons Signature Glass Façade wraps around the building, creating a transparency between the opera house and the surrounding Performance Park. An 84-foot (26 m) wide section of the glass façade is retractable to a height of 23 feet (7.0 m), literally opening up the Grand Lobby, Cafe and Box Circle-level Restaurant to Performance Park.

The Grand Portico, radiating from the opera house on all sides, provides shade over 3 acres (12,000 m^{2}) of the Performance Park. The solar canopy's louvers are arranged at fixed angles following the path of the sun. By eliminating most direct sunlight on the façade and by creating a cooler microclimate around the building, the canopy significantly reduce the energy requirements of the Winspear Opera House.

In May 2009 artist Guillermo Kuitca was commissioned to design the stage curtain. The design abstracts the seating plan for the Winspear's Margaret McDermott Performance Hall and reproduces this image onto the curtain itself.

A key design feature is the 318-rod chandelier located inside the performance hall, named The Moody Foundation Chandelier. The chandelier hangs 50 feet below the ceiling. Starting Friday, June 28, 2013, the traditional pre-performance ascent of The Moody Chandelier has been accompanied by an exclusively adapted piece “The Light” by American composer Philip Glass. Once retracted into the ceiling, it leaves the impression of a star lit night, as each rod has the ability to "twinkle." The acrylic rods are illuminated by three primary color LEDs which allows the chandelier to be lit in virtually any color.
