= AT&T Performing Arts Center =

Performing arts center in Dallas, Texas

Coordinates: 32°47′26″N 96°47′50″W

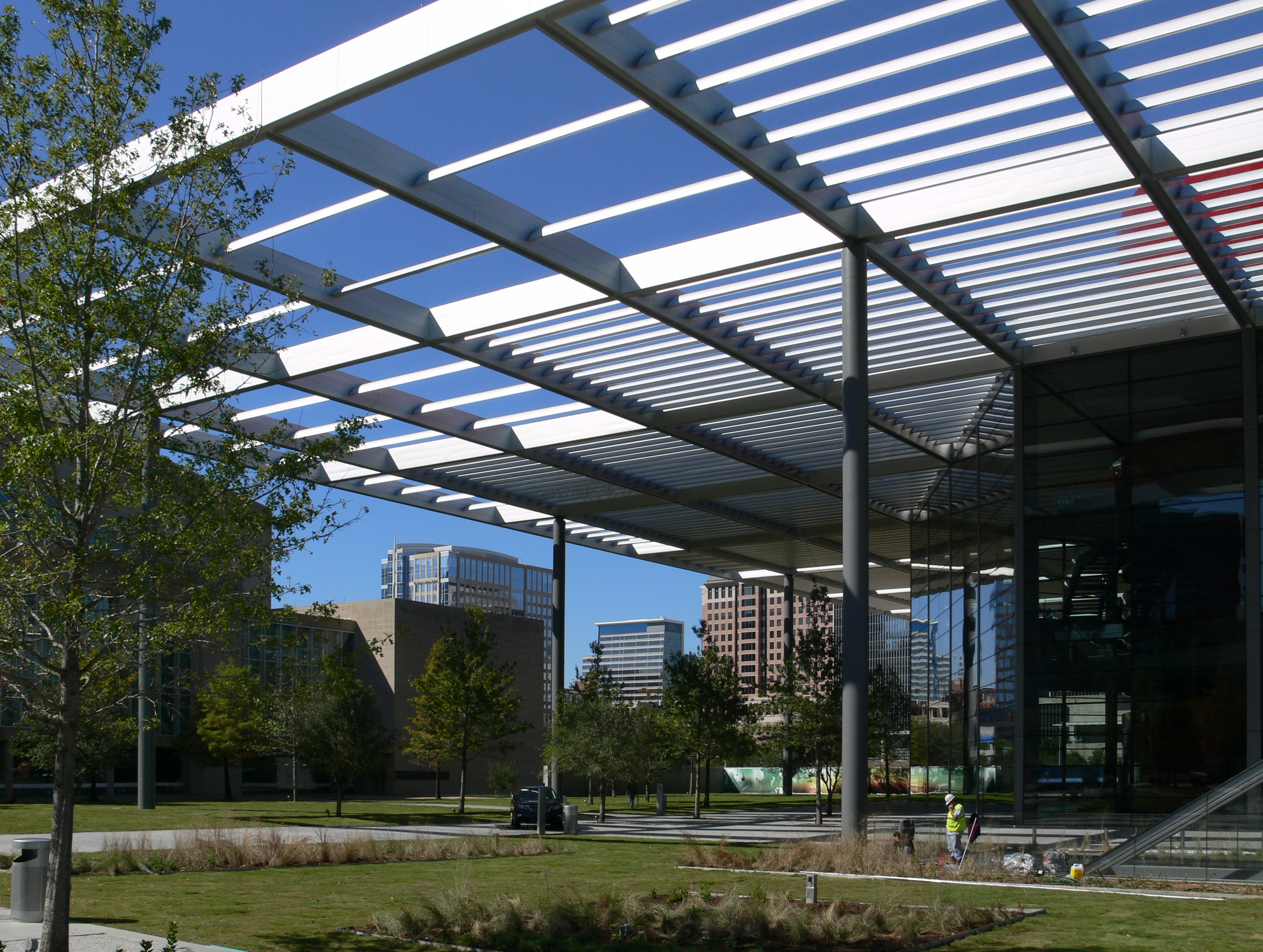
The completed center viewed from the South. Construction on additional facilities is nearing completion.

The AT&T Performing Arts Center in Dallas, Texas, preliminarily referred to as the Dallas Center for the Performing Arts, is a $354-million multi-venue center in the Dallas Arts District for performances of opera, musical theater, classic and experimental theater, ballet and other forms of dance. It opened with a dedication by city leaders on October 12, 2009.

Three major architectural firms Foster and Partners (based in London), Office for Metropolitan Architecture (based in Rotterdam and New York City), and REX (based in New York) each designed portions of the center.

== Performance venues ==
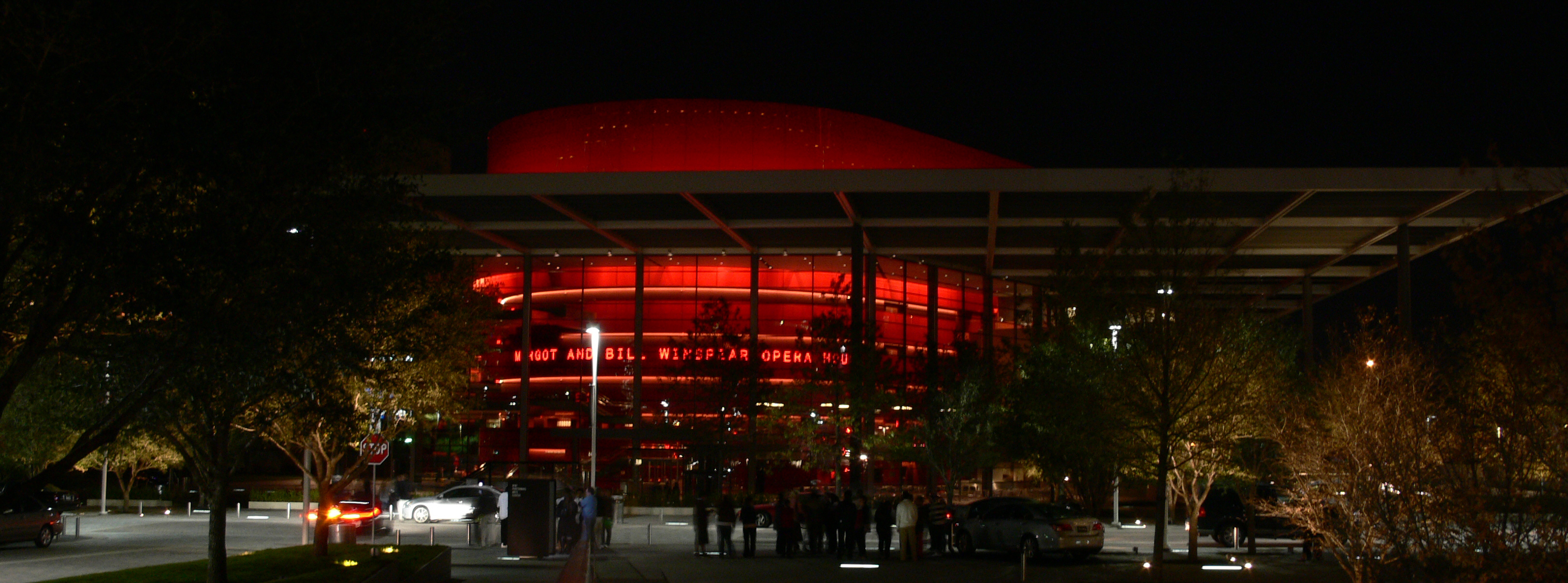
The Winspear Opera House seen at night.

The AT&T Performing Arts Center includes four venues and an urban park:

- Margot and Bill Winspear Opera House, named for Margot and Bill Winspear, who donated $42 million to the center, is a 2,200 seat opera house (with capacity up to 2,300) and the new venue for the Dallas Opera and Texas Ballet Theater.
- Dee and Charles Wyly Theatre, named for Dee and Charles Wyly, who donated $20 million to the center, is a twelve-story building containing 80,300 sq ft (7,460 m^{2}) of space. The theatre holds about 600 people, depending upon the stage configuration and is the new home for the Dallas Theater Center, Dallas Black Dance Theatre and Anita N. Martinez Ballet Folklorico.
- The redesigned Annette Strauss Square is an outdoor performance space with lawn seating for 2,500.
- The Elaine D. and Charles A. Sammons Park, named for Sammons Enterprises, Inc., who donated $15 million to the center, is a 10-acre (40,000 m^{2}) urban park unifying the venues. Designed by Michel Desvigne of Paris with JJR, Sammons Park was the most significant public park in downtown Dallas until the 2012 debut of Klyde Warren Park.

== Programming and resident companies ==
The AT&T Performing Arts Center provides homes for five resident companies: the Dallas Opera, Dallas Theater Center, Texas Ballet Theater, Dallas Black Dance Theatre, and Anita N. Martinez Ballet Folklorico. In addition, the center will also produce original programming and partner with local and national organizations to present a wide range of cultural performances, including music, dance, Broadway shows, concerts and lectures. SHN consults with the center on its Broadway series.

In its inaugural 2009–2010 season at the center hosted more than 500 performances, including four world premieres, with performers Billy Crystal, Frank Langella, Hilary Swank, tenors José Carreras and Ben Heppner, jazz greats Ramsey Lewis, Al Jarreau and many others.

== History ==
=== Fundraising ===
The initial campaign began in 2000 with a goal of raising $275 million including forty gifts of $1 million. Only $18 million of the total budget for the project was publicly funded (more than 93% of funding coming from private sources).

In January 2008, campaign funding reached $275 million.

The two largest gifts came earlier in the campaign: $42 million from Margot and Bill Winspear in 2002 and $20 million from Dee and Charles Wyly and Cheryl and Sam Wyly in 2004. The third largest gift was given in September 2008: a $15 million gift from Sammons Enterprises, Inc. in honor of Elaine D. and Charles A. Sammons.

=== Construction and dedication ===
Groundbreaking was November 2005 and dedication was on October 12, 2009, followed by a Grand Opening week with various performances, concerts, and architecture forums. Kevin Duncan produced the grand opening concerts and productions. A community open house was held Sunday, October 18, 2009, and featured free outdoor concerts, performance art, family activities and fireworks.

=== Naming rights ===
On September 15, 2009, AT&T announced the naming-rights agreement for the performance facility. As part of the deal, The center will be one of the most technologically advanced performing arts venues in the country, equipped with AT&T Wi-Fi service and complimentary Internet access to patrons. AT&T will also offer unique mobile applications to AT&T wireless subscribers.
