= Wes Wise =

American journalist and politician (1928–2022)

50th Mayor of Dallas
- In office 1971–1976
- Preceded by: J. Erik Jonsson
- Succeeded by: Adlene Harrison

Personal details
- Born: November 25, 1928 Shreveport, Louisiana, U.S.
- Died: December 9, 2022 (aged 94)
- Party: Democratic
- Spouse: Sally
- Profession: Sports journalist

Wes Wise (November 25, 1928 – December 9, 2022) was an American journalist and politician who served from 1971 to 1976 as a three-term mayor of Dallas, Texas.

== Early life and TV news career ==
Wise was born in Shreveport, Louisiana, on November 25, 1928. Wise dropped out of high school at the age of fifteen upon the death of his father and begin work at a local radio station in Monroe, Louisiana. Although Wise earned a diploma by passing the high school equivalency test, he never graduated from college. He served in the United States Army for two years.

In the 1940s and 1950s, Wise was a play-by-play sports announcer for Gordon McLendon's Liberty Broadcasting System radio network, which mainly broadcast live recreations of Major League Baseball games by means of broadcasters like Wise following the action via Western Union ticker tape reports, and then relaying the plays to the listening audience in a more lively style that included studio sound effects meant to simulate the ballgames.

Wise went on to work for many years as a sports director at KRLD-TV, a Dallas CBS television affiliate. In 1960, he teamed with Davey O'Brien to call Dallas Cowboys games for CBS.

== Kennedy assassination ==
During his CBS years, Wise also occasionally covered hard news. In particular, Wise provided on-the-spot coverage of the assassination of John F. Kennedy at the Dealey Plaza in Downtown Dallas on November 22, 1963.

On November 23 at the Texas School Book Depository where Lee Harvey Oswald had worked, Wise encountered Jack Ruby who expressed concern that Jackie Kennedy might be required to return to Dallas if Oswald were tried for Kennedy's murder. Wise was present in the Dallas Municipal Building when Oswald was shot dead. Wise testified as a witness for both the defense and the prosecution at Jack Ruby's trial for the murder of Oswald.

Wise was a co-author of the 2004 memoir When the News Went Live: Dallas 1963. Of Dallas during Kennedy's visit, Wise has said, "Let's face it: At the time, Dallas was considered a hotbed of right-wing hysteria. It served as the regional headquarters of the John Birch Society, and Gen. Edwin Walker—whom many considered a far-out extremist—had moved here. You might remember that Lee Harvey Oswald took a shot at him, too. H. L. Hunt's right-wing radio program originated here. So it was hardly a haven for liberals."

During his two terms as mayor of Dallas, Wise guided Dallas from under the cloud of the assassination and at the same time saved the Texas School Book Depository from imminent destruction, preserving it for further research into the president's murder.

== Political career ==
Wise was elected to the Dallas City Council in 1969 and then was elected mayor two years later; both are nominally nonpartisan positions. Wise did "much during his term to eradicate the bad image Dallas had nationally after the [Kennedy] assassination." Wise resigned midway when he resigned to run for the Democratic nomination in Texas's 5th congressional district, losing to State Representative Jim Mattox.

== Personal life and death ==
Wise died on December 9, 2022, at the age of 94.

Preceded by J. Erik Jonsson	Mayor of Dallas; 1971–1976	Succeeded by Adlene Harrison
