= Arts District, Dallas =

Neighborhood in Dallas, Texas

Coordinates: 32°47′21.57″N 96°47′53.88″W

Dallas Arts District
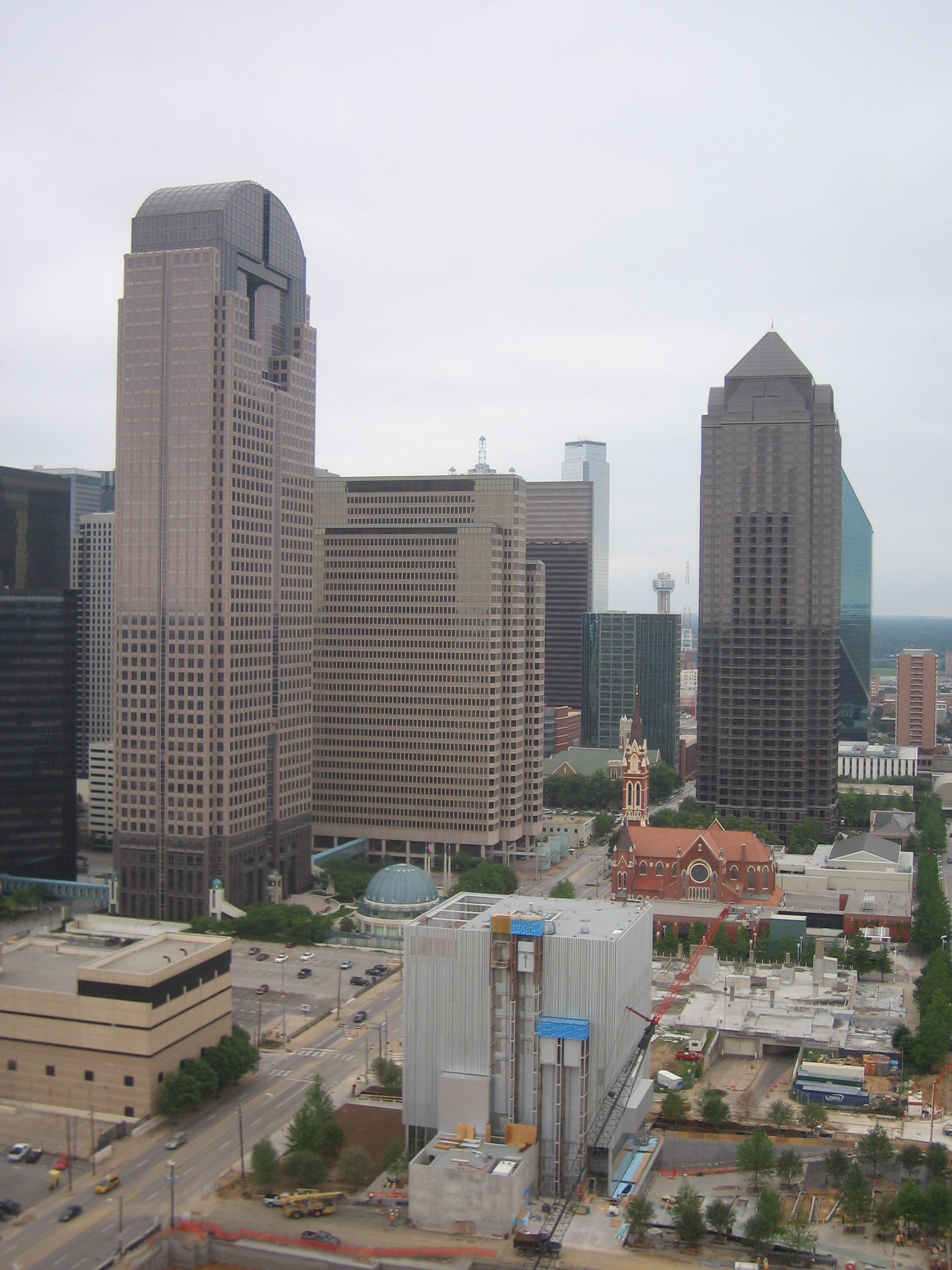
- Overview of the District

- Location in Dallas
- Interactive map of Dallas Arts District
- Location within Texas Location within the United States
- Country: United States
- State: Texas
- County: Dallas
- City: Dallas
- Area: Downtown

Area
  - Total: 0.19 sq mi (0.48 km^{2})
  - Land: 0.11 sq mi (0.28 km^{2})
  - Water: 0 sq mi (0.0 km^{2}) 0%
- Elevation: 460 ft (140 m)
- ZIP code: 75201, 75202
- Area codes: 214, 469, 972
- Website: www.dallasartsdistrict.org

The Arts District is a performing and visual arts district in Downtown Dallas, Texas.

The district is 118 acres (0.48 km^{2}) large and is home to some of Dallas's most significant cultural landmarks including facilities for visual, performing, and developing arts. It is located south of State Thomas; southeast of Uptown; north of the City Center District; west of Bryan Place; and east of the West End Historic District. It is bounded by St. Paul Street, Ross Avenue, Spur 366 (Woodall Rodgers Freeway), and the US 75/I-45 (unsigned I-345) elevated freeway (Central Expressway). (Previously the district extended east only to Routh Street, but a 9 March 2005 Dallas City Council approval extended it east to I-345.) The Arts District is a member of the Global Cultural Districts Network. In 2025, USA Today named the Dallas Arts District as the best art district in America for a creative escape for the second consecutive year.

== Arts District venues ==
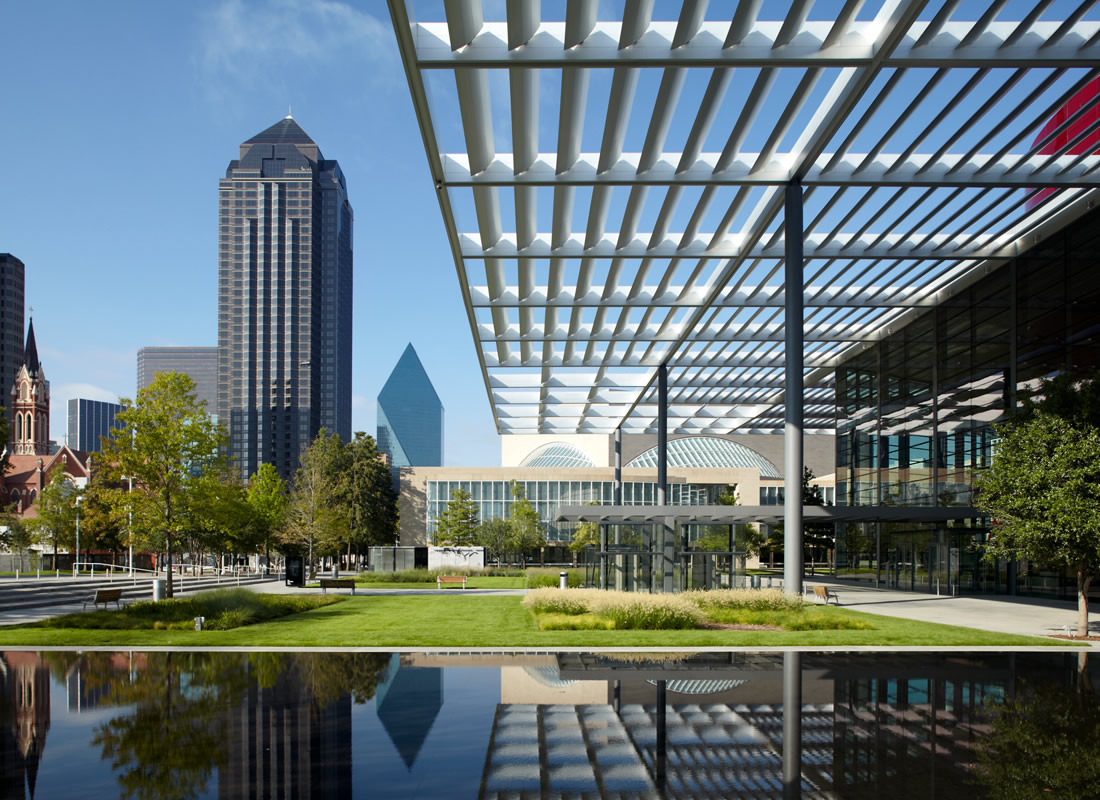
Pictured in the foreground is the Margot and Bill Winspear Opera House with its reflecting pool and the Morton H. Meyerson Symphony Center, both located within the Dallas Arts District.

The Arts District is home to 18 facilities and organizations including The Annette Strauss Square, the Arts District Mansion/Dallas Bar Association, Booker T. Washington High School for the Performing and Visual Arts, Cathedral Shrine of the Virgin of Guadalupe, Dallas Black Dance Theatre, Dallas Museum of Art, Dallas Symphony Orchestra, Dallas Theater Center, Morton H. Meyerson Symphony Center, Nasher Sculpture Center, St. Paul United Methodist Church, Fellowship Church, First United Methodist Church, Margot & Bill Winspear Opera House, Dee and Charles Wyly Theater, Moody Performance Hall, the Green Family Art Foundation, and the Crow Museum of Asian Art, housed in a portion of the Trammell Crow Center.

In addition, multiple other organizations perform in the District consistently throughout the year. This includes everything from concerts to outdoor festivals, to lectures, youth education programs, and more.

- AT&T Performing Arts Center
  - Annette Strauss Square
  - Dee and Charles Wyly Theatre
  - Margot and Bill Winspear Opera House
- Moody Performance Hall
- Booker T. Washington High School for the Performing and Visual Arts
- Crow Museum of Asian Art
- Dallas Museum of Art
- Morton H. Meyerson Symphony Center
- Nasher Sculpture Center
- Klyde Warren Park
- First United Methodist Church (Dallas, Texas)

== Other structures ==
- Arts District Mansion / Dallas Bar Association
- Cathedral Santuario de Guadalupe
- Dallas Black Dance Theatre (formerly the Moorland YMCA)
- Trammell Crow Center
- Klyde Warren Park
- St. Paul United Methodist Church

== Transportation ==
=== Light rail ===
- DART: Blue Line, Green Line, Red Line, and Orange Line
  - St. Paul Station (in City Center District)
  - Pearl/Arts District Station (in City Center District)

=== Streetcars ===
- MATA: M-Line Trolley

The M-Line Trolley is a heritage streetcar that provides service between Cityplace/Uptown station in Uptown and St Paul station in Downtown. Service is free.
The M-Line features 40 dedicated stops serving key destinations including: the West Village, McKinney Avenue, Klyde Warren Park, the Dallas Arts District, four historical cemeteries, and the State Thomas historic neighborhood.

=== Highways ===
- Spur 366 (Woodall Rodgers Freeway)
- US 75 Central Expressway/ I-45 connection (unsigned I-345)

== Education ==
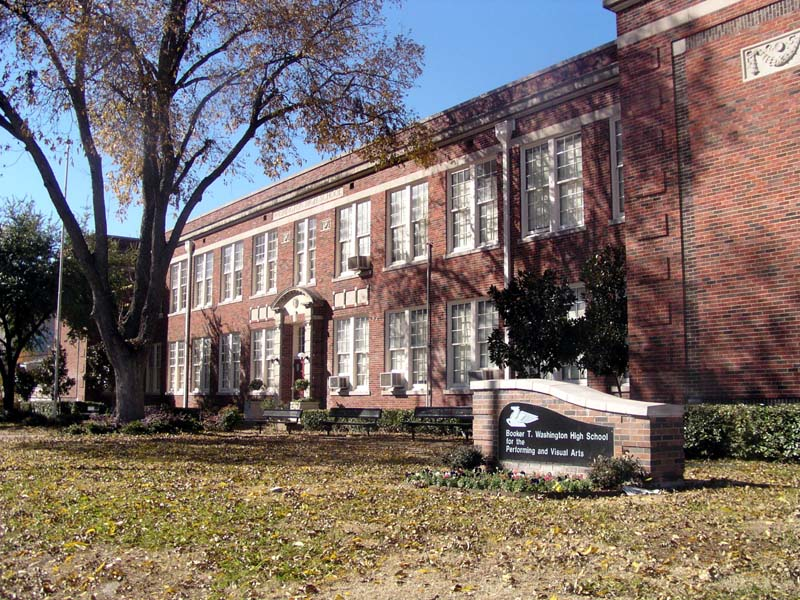
Booker T. Washington High School for the Performing and Visual Arts

The Arts District is served by the Dallas Independent School District. One school, the Booker T. Washington High School for the Performing and Visual Arts, is located in the Arts District. Residents of the Arts District north and east of Akard Street are zoned to Sam Houston Elementary School. Residents south and west of Akard are zoned to Hope Medrano Elementary School. All Arts District residents are zoned to Thomas J. Rusk Middle School and North Dallas High School.
