= Turtle Creek =

Turtle Creek may refer to:

== Streams ==
Canada

- Turtle Creek (New Brunswick), a tributary of the Petitcodiac River

United States

- Turtle Creek (New Jersey), a tributary of the Mullica River
- Turtle Creek (Little Miami River), a tributary of the Little Miami River in Turtlecreek Township, Warren County, Ohio
- Turtle Creek (Monongahela River), a tributary of the Monongahela River, which flows through Turtle Creek, Pennsylvania
- Turtle Creek (West Branch Susquehanna River), a tributary of the West Branch Susquehanna River in Union County, Pennsylvania
- Turtle Creek (South Dakota)
- Turtle Creek (Dallas County, Texas), a tributary of the Trinity River
- Turtle Creek (Matagorda County, Texas)
- Turtle Creek (Kerr County, Texas), a tributary of the Guadalupe River
- Turtle Creek (West Virginia)
- Turtle Creek (Wisconsin), a tributary of the Rock River (Mississippi River)
- Saltese Creek (Washington), a stream often erroneously called Turtle Creek due to an adjacent housing development of the same name

== Places ==
Canada

- Turtle Creek, New Brunswick, a community in Albert County

United States

- Turtle Creek Township, Todd County, Minnesota
- Turtle Creek Township, Shelby County, Ohio
- Turtlecreek Township, Warren County, Ohio
- Turtle Creek, Pennsylvania, a borough in Allegheny County
- Turtle Creek, Dallas, a neighborhood around the stream in Dallas, Texas
  - Turtle Creek Boulevard, a road through the Dallas neighborhood
- Turtle Creek, West Virginia, an unincorporated community in Boone County
- Turtle Creek, Wisconsin, the former name of Beloit, Wisconsin
