= Transportation in Dallas =

This article is about transportation systems in and around Dallas, Texas (USA).

== Walking and bicycling ==
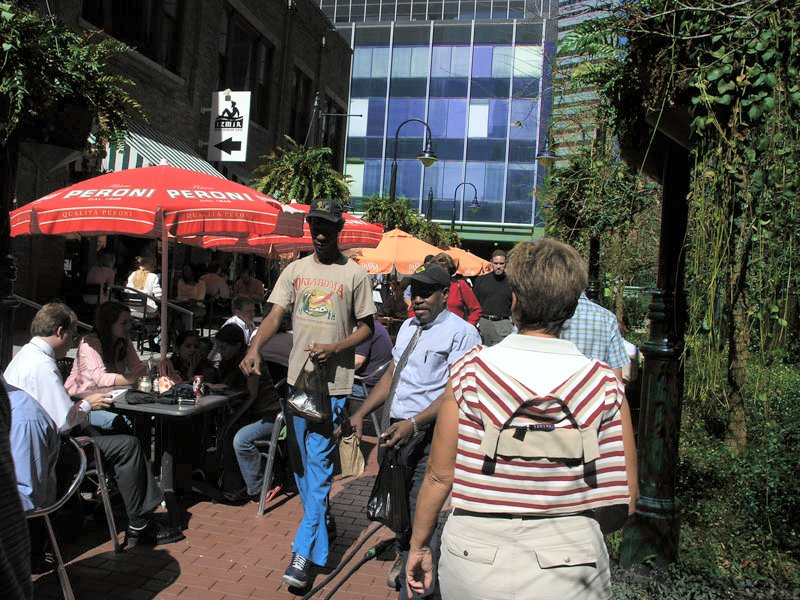
Pedestrians along Stone Street, near the Main Street corridor of downtown Dallas.

Dallas is the 30th most walkable large city in the US, with a Walk Score of 47. Most of the pedestrian-friendly areas in the city are near downtown and Uptown. The majority of Dallas, whether or not it was developed with the pedestrian in mind, was completely rebuilt or reworked to accommodate the vehicle in the mid-20th century. In the late 1990s and early 2000s (decade), the importance of the pedestrian, bicyclist, and those who use mass transportation began to be realized and most new developments cater to all forms of transportation.

Walking trails, though once nonexistent, are also starting to be built and improved by the city. Perhaps the flagship is the Katy Trail, built over the old Katy Railway, which goes from the Victory Park neighborhood through Uptown and Oak Lawn up to Knox Park. Other trails include the levee-top trails along the Trinity River and the Texas Buckeye Trail in the Great Trinity Forest of south Dallas. The city also maintains walking trails at area parks including parks around White Rock Lake and Bachman Lake.

The city maintains 800 lane miles of cyclist-selected bike routes along low-volume roadways throughout the city that parallel major thoroughfares. The City does not employ bicycle control devices like bike lanes, as the necessary pre-conditions do not exist. The city has also installed a series of Pedestrian Tunnels in Downtown Dallas, although these have been under much criticism regarding their ability to "suck the life off of" the aboveground streets.

== Streets ==
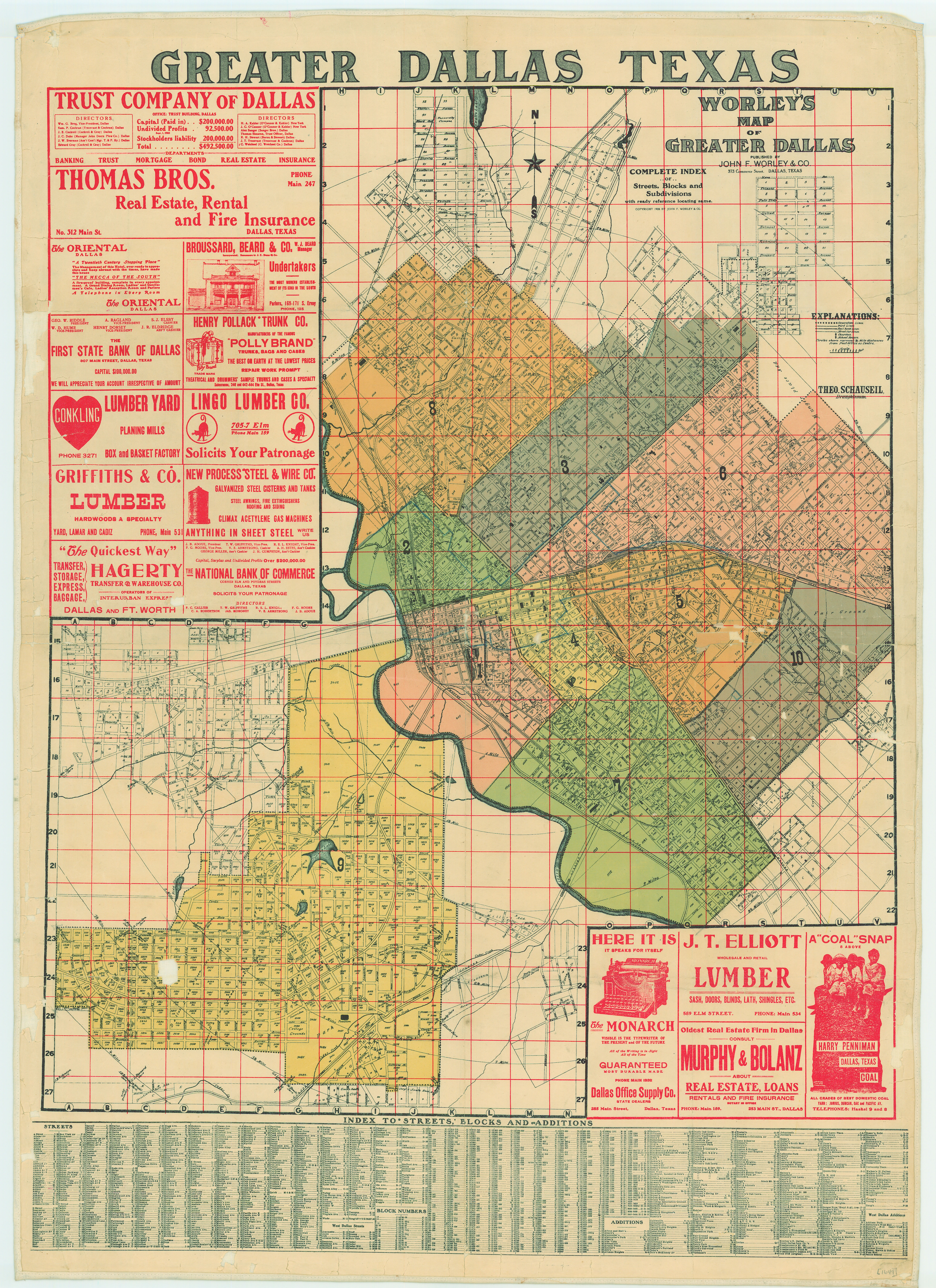
A 1905 map showing several early street grid attempts

Major and minor thoroughfares in Dallas and its enclaves

Dallas is devoid of any major street grid as a whole, though a number of major attempts intersect at awkward angles and in confusing interchanges around the city. The main street grid in the center city runs 45° to the typical N/S/E/W grid, creating confusion for many out-of-town visitors. This street grid prevails primarily in east Dallas, though it also permeates Oak Lawn, portions of downtown, and the Cedars. Another much smaller street grid lies downtown between Pacific and Young streets — it is about 15° off the typical N/S/E/W grid, and is on average 5-8 streets across N/S and about 3 miles (5 km) wide E/W. There is also a fairly extensive N/S/E/W grid around the original city of Oak Cliff. The rest of Dallas, developed from the middle of the 20th century on, is typically on a N/S/E/W grid, especially with major thoroughfares. In trying to make the city traversable, city planners have over time created wide boulevards that jump between the rights-of-way of multiple minor streets, trying to force a wide road wherever they can discover space for it. This forces the destruction of the minor streets' original paths, a name-change for the boulevard or minor streets, and roads (e.g. Cole 1, 2, 3) that exist in two or more places. Major thoroughfares in Oak Cliff typically do not cross the Trinity River, and when they do, they frequently do not continue with the same name on the north or eastern sides, which creates a degree of confusion. Also, many times a street will change names each time it crosses a municipal border. Conversely, many streets keep their names through sharp turns across the city.

== Highways ==
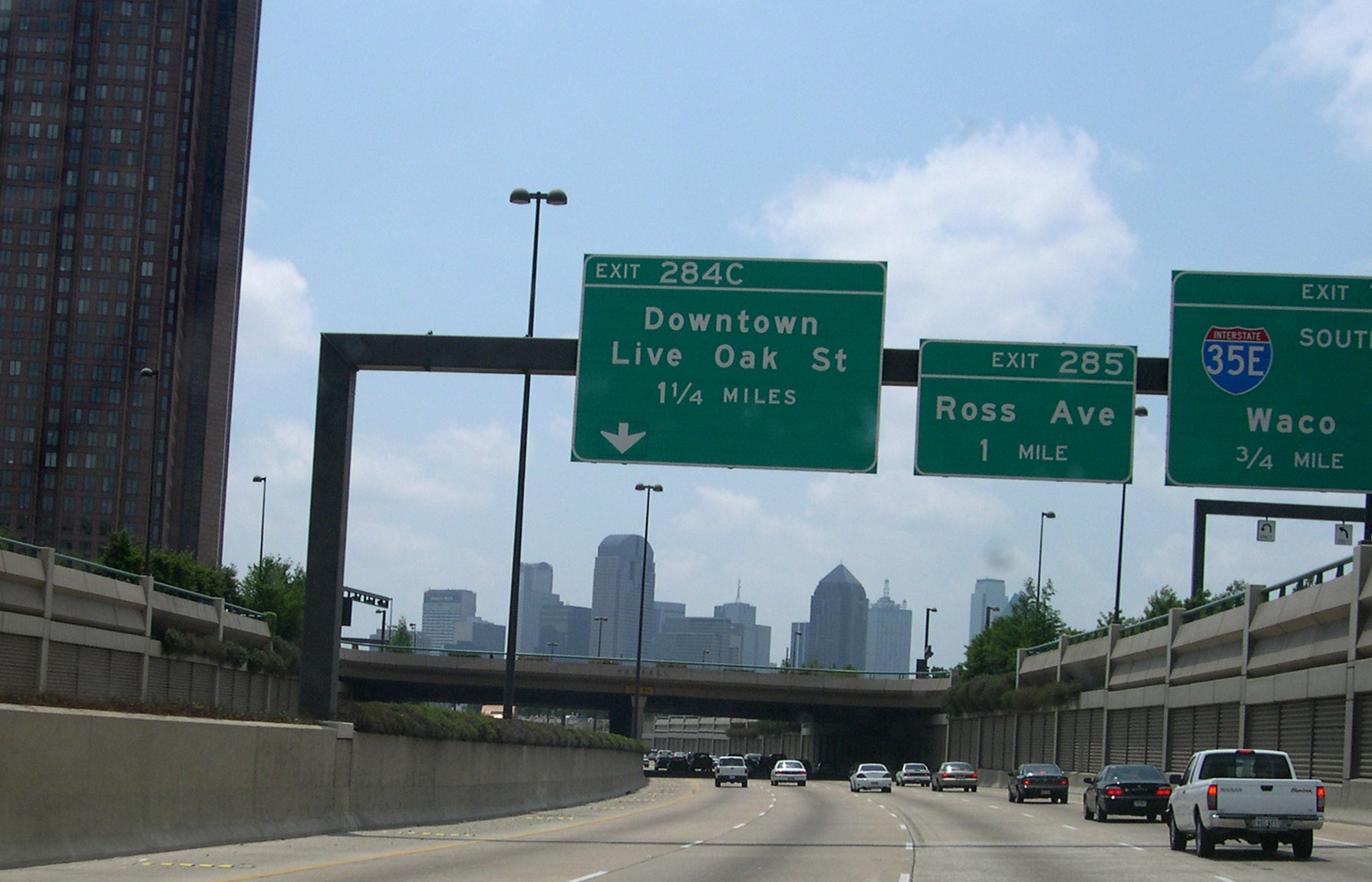
North Central Expressway southbound towards downtown Dallas

The city of Dallas is at the confluence of a large number of major interstate highways—Interstates 20, 30, 35E, and 45 all run through the city. The city's freeway system, as it has no major geographical inhibitors surrounding it, is set up in the popular hub-and-spoke system, much like a wagon wheel. The center of the system is the downtown freeway loop, made up of Interstate 30 on the south, Interstate 35E on the west, Spur 366 on the north, and Interstate 345 on the east. (Interstate 345 is a short spur of Interstate 45 that connects Interstate 45 with US 75.) The next major freeway loop is the Interstate 635/20 Lyndon B. Johnson loop, and the outermost is the tolled President George Bush Turnpike. Inside these freeway loops are other partially limited-access and parkway-style loops including Loop 12 and Belt Line Road. Another beltway around the city is planned upwards of 45 miles (72 km) from downtown in Collin County. Radiating out of downtown as the spokes of the system are Interstates 30, 35E, and 45, US 75, US 175, Spur 366, the tolled Dallas North Tollway, and further out SH 114, US 80 and US 67. Other major highways within the city that do not serve primarily as spokes include SH 183 and Spur 408.

Portions of Interstates 30, 35E, and 635, and US 75 also have either bidirectional or reversible HOV lanes. Future highway plans typically integrate usage of both HOV and/or HOT (tolled) lanes, e.g. the expansion of Interstate 635. Plans for the road include HOV lanes and massive HOT tunnels in the heavily congested segment of the highway between, generally, Interstate 35E and US 75. This portion of the highway travels through one of the densest regions of north Dallas, which, coupled with its primary role as a circulator for commuters, makes the freeway constantly congested at all hours of the day and night.

The city of Dallas's freeways, much like the city, are generally relatively new and in good condition. TxDOT is famous for its highway system in the state and many of what could be considered "flagship freeways" lie within the city. One example is North Central Expressway or US 75, which was trenched, immaculately landscaped and heavily ornamented between downtown and Loop 12 in the 1990s. Interstate 30 west of downtown Dallas was recently brought to a level near North Central Expressway and Interstate 635, Interstate 30 east of downtown, and Interstate 35E all share similar futures. Construction, like many cities, is a constant burden for the city's heavily automobile-centered culture.

== Mass transportation ==
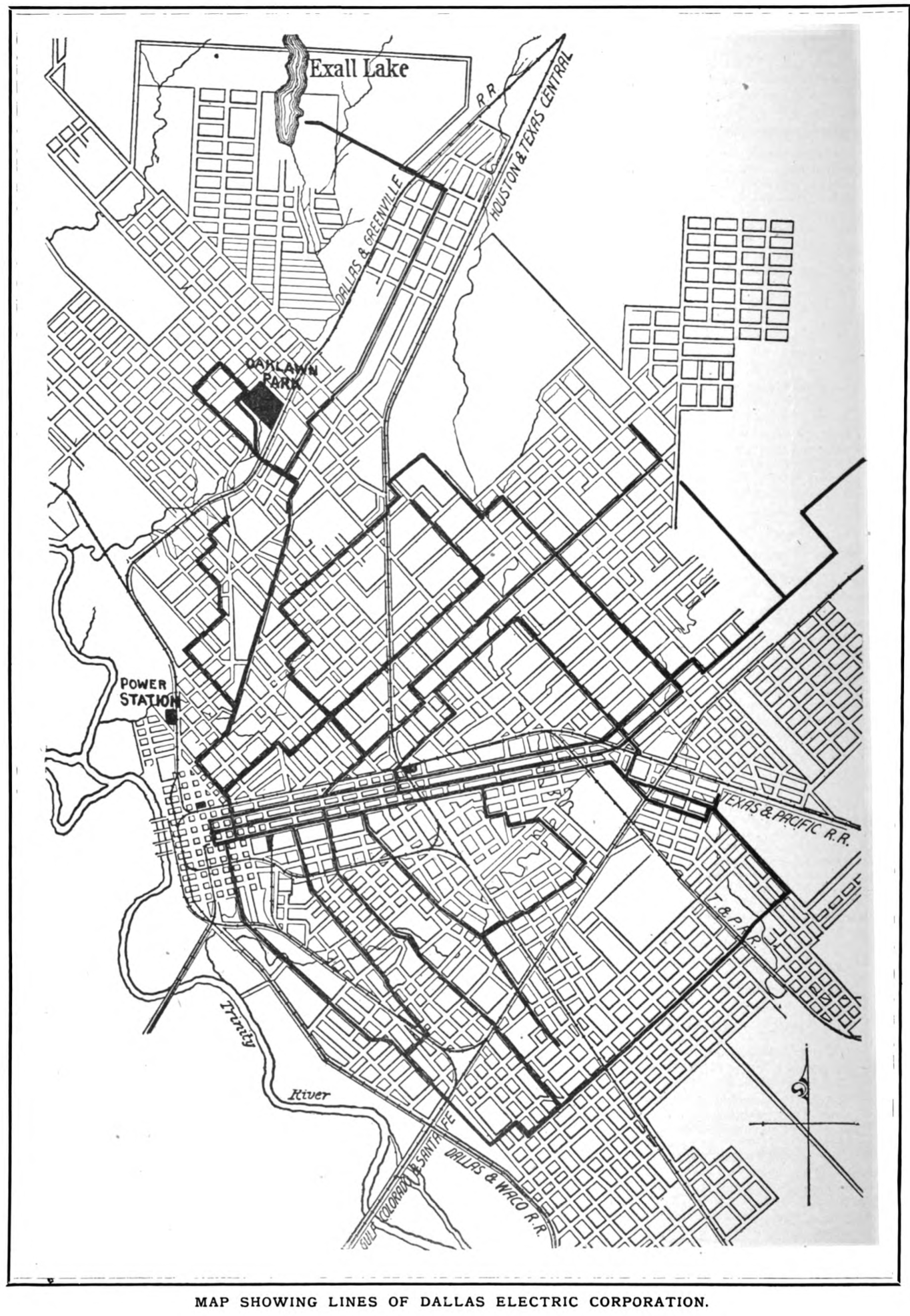
Map Showing Lines of the Dallas Electric Corporation c 1907

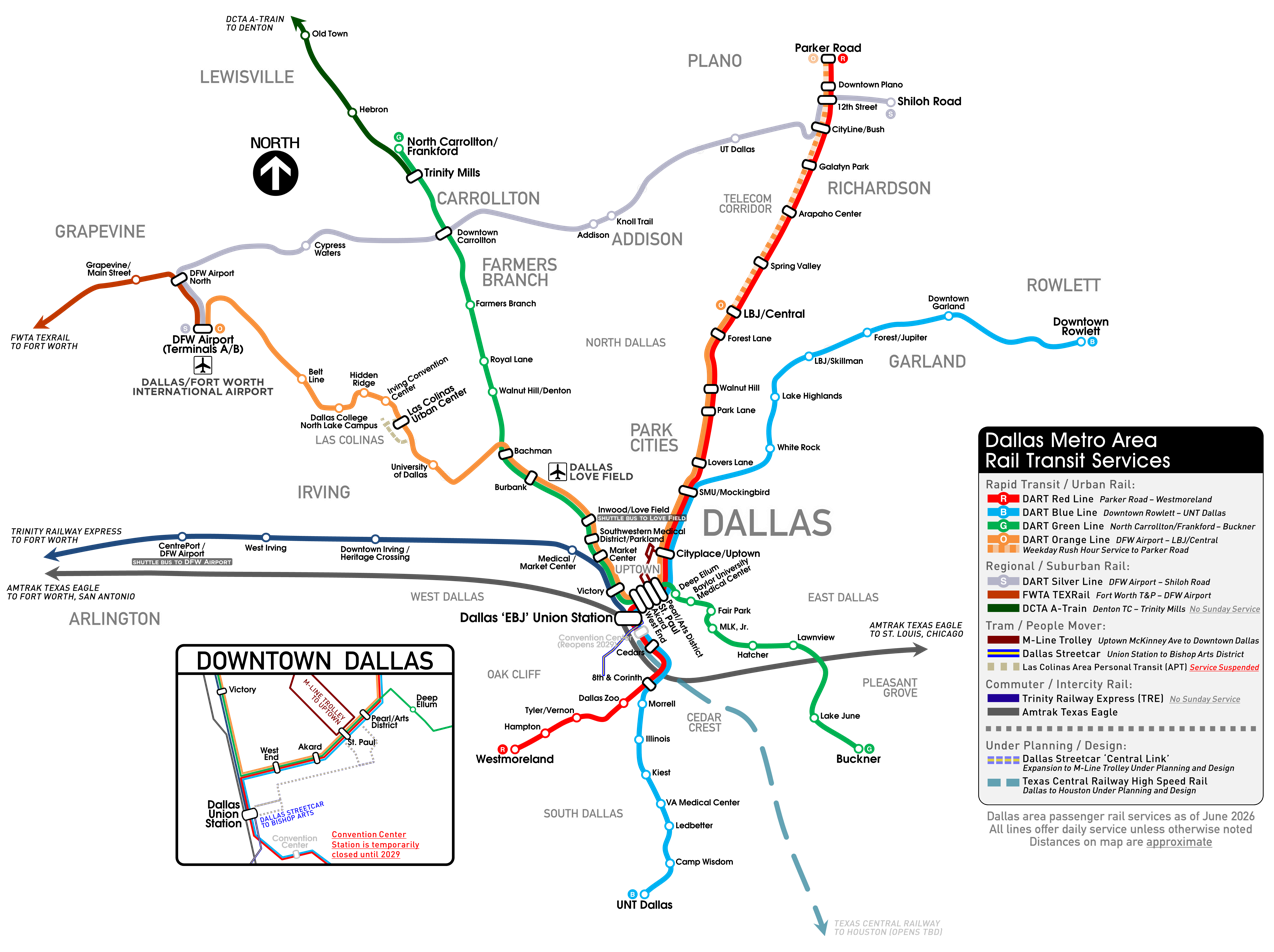
Map of public rail transit in the Dallas metro area

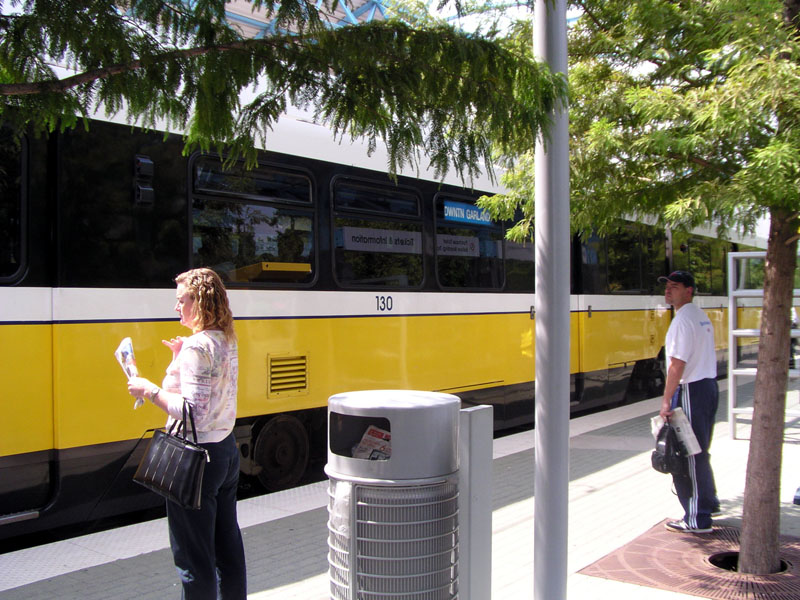
Passengers at White Rock Station on DART's Blue Line

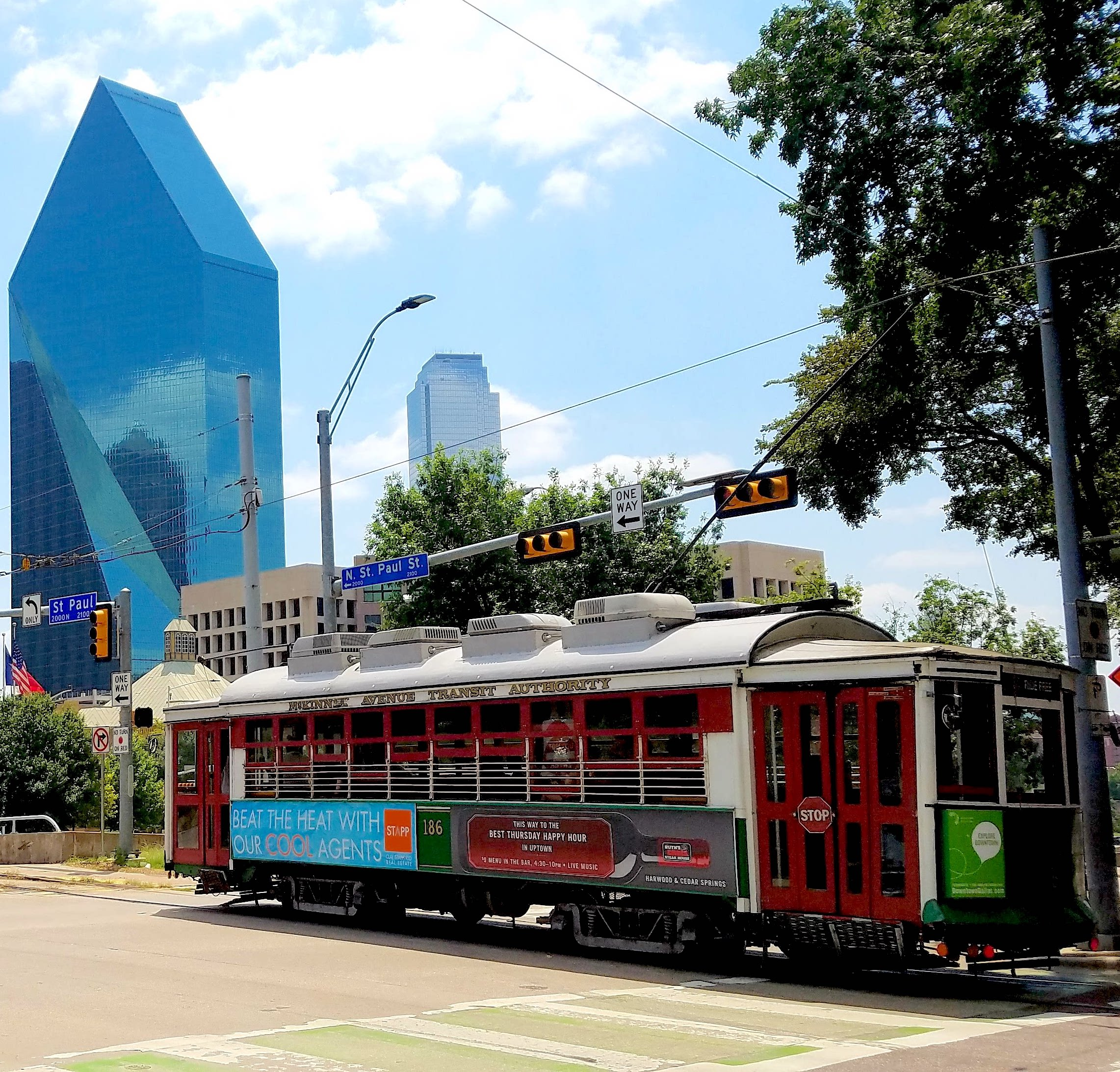
MATA Car #186 operating on the M-Line

Dallas Area Rapid Transit (DART) is the Dallas area public transportation authority, providing bus and rail service.

DART began operating the first light rail system in the Southwest United States in 1996 and continues to expand its coverage. Currently, four light rail lines and one hybrid rail line are in service. The Red Line goes through Oak Cliff, downtown, Uptown, North Dallas, Richardson and Plano. The Blue Line goes through South Dallas, downtown, Uptown, North Dallas, Garland, and Rowlett. The Green Line goes through south east Dallas, Fair Park, Baylor University Medical Center, downtown, Victory, west of Dallas Love Field, Farmers Branch, then ends in Carrollton. The Orange Line follows the DART Red Line from North Plano through downtown, then follows the Green Line up through Victory, to Bachman Station, then goes west to Las Colinas before terminating at DFW Airport. The Silver Line goes through Grapevine, Carrollton, Addison, Richardson, and Plano. All current rail lines are connected downtown by four rail stations. Red, Orange and Blue Lines connect to Cityplace/Uptown Station, currently the only subway station in the Southwest.

The M-Line Trolley, a heritage streetcar, provides service between Cityplace/Uptown station in Uptown and St Paul station in Downtown.

DART completed expansions to the Orange line in 2014, bringing the length of the light rail system to around 93 miles (150 km). Further ambitions include expanding the commuter rail network in the region to over 93 miles (150 km); expanding the DART rail network to over 150 miles (240 km) with a second route through downtown included; expanding the Dallas Streetcar to the Bishop Arts District and Convention Center Hotel; and expanding the elevated Las Colinas Area Personal Transit system to serve new entertainment venues in the area.

The DART rail system remained the only light rail system in Texas until Houston opened METRORail, its starter light rail system (one line running less than 10 miles), in 2004. Fort Worth's smaller public transit system connects with Dallas's via a commuter rail line, the Trinity Railway Express, connecting downtown Dallas's Union Station with downtown Fort Worth's T&P Station and several points in between. The light rail system has caused a dramatic increase in land values in downtown Dallas and has sparked a residential population boom in the area. Although the system is increasingly popular, large parts of the Metroplex remain outside the current service area of the system and remain dependent on the automobile.

DART now uses Google Maps as its main provider of transit information. An independent company, Dadnab, offers a service that enables riders to retrieve similar information using text messaging from their mobile phones. DART provides transit route and schedule information to Google and this has spawned a new generation of trip planners such as TransitTrips.

== Intercity Buses ==
Greyhound Lines operates the majority of the inter-city bus service to and from Dallas.

Megabus operates low-cost double-decker coaches from Dallas to major cities in Texas and Arkansas.

Shofur operates services from Dallas to major cities in Texas.

El Expreso Bus Company operates services to a station in Dallas adjacent to the Tornado Bus Company station.

Tornado Bus Company operates service to a station in Dallas.

Turimex Internacional operates service to two stations, with one in Dallas and one in Garland.

Omnibus Express operates service to two stations, with one in Dallas and one in Garland.

Los Paisanos Autobuses operates service to a station in Dallas. enjoy

AtoB Transfer offers a premium shuttle service from the airport to the surrounding area.

Longhorn Charter Bus offers private charter bus and minibus rentals in Dallas and the Fort Worth area.

== Dallas Union Station rail service ==
Amtrak's Texas Eagle train makes a stop at the Dallas Union Station. Its eastern terminus is Chicago, Illinois. Its western terminus is San Antonio, however, sleeping car passengers have continuing service on the Sunset Limited, to Los Angeles. The station also is a transfer point for the aforementioned DART light rail and Trinity Railway Express commuter rail.

== Airports ==
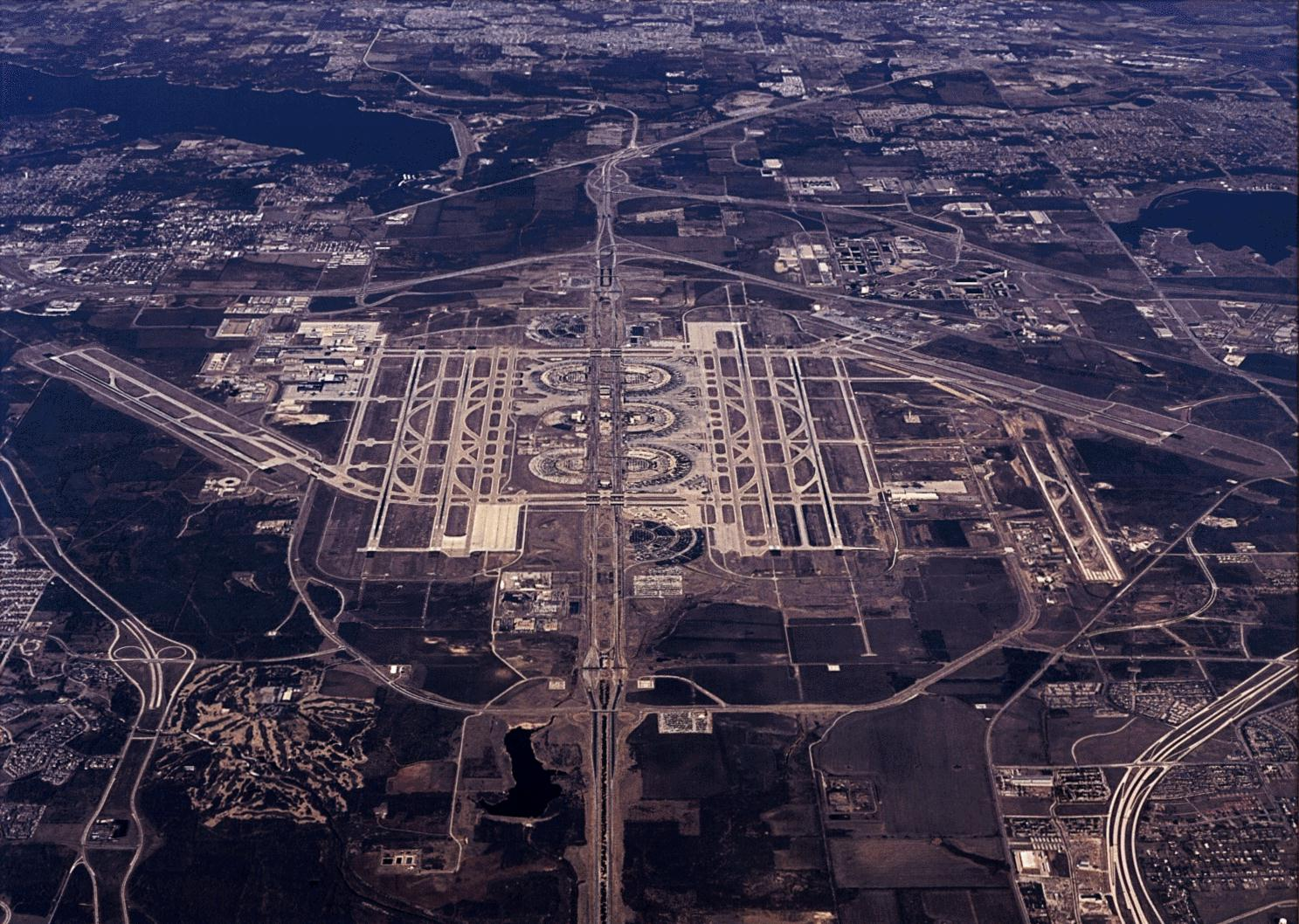
Dallas/Fort Worth International Airport serves most passengers flying in and out of the metroplex

Dallas is served by two commercial airports: Dallas/Fort Worth International Airport (known as DFW International) and Dallas Love Field. In addition, Dallas Executive Airport (formerly Redbird Airport), is a general aviation airport located within the city limits, and Addison Airport is another general aviation airport located just outside the city limits in the suburb of Addison. Another general aviation airport, Denton Municipal Airport is located 40 miles (64 km) northwest of Dallas in Denton. Two more general aviation airports are located in the outer suburb of McKinney, and on the west side of the Metroplex, two general aviation airports are located in Fort Worth.

DFW International Airport is located in the suburbs north of and equidistant to downtown Fort Worth and downtown Dallas. In terms of size, DFW is the largest airport in the state, the second largest in the United States, and third largest in the world. In terms of traffic, DFW is the busiest in the state, third busiest in the United States, and sixth busiest in the world. DFW is also home base to American Airlines, formerly the world's largest airline which operates eighty-four percent of all passenger traffic at the airport. Air Cargo World named DFW "The Best Cargo Airport in the World" on 7 March 2006.

Love Field is located within the city limits of Dallas, 6 miles (10 km) northwest of downtown, and is headquarters to Southwest Airlines. Under the Federal "Wright Amendment" and "Shelby Amendment" laws, no large jet air service was allowed before 2014 from Dallas Love Field to any point beyond Texas, Louisiana, Arkansas, Oklahoma, New Mexico, Kansas, Mississippi, Alabama, and Missouri. However, the amendment was entirely repealed in an all-party compromise that took effect in 2014, and Love Field is now able to service any city in America.

== See also ==
- Table of Cities by Modal Share
- Plug-in electric vehicles in Texas § Dallas–Fort Worth
