= Cedar Springs Road =

Road in Dallas, Texas, United States

- Southeast end: Turtle Creek Boulevard
- Major junctions: SH 289 (Oak Lawn Avenue); Wycliff Avenue; Dallas North Tollway; Inwood Road; Mockingbird Lane
- Northwest end: Dallas Love Field

Cedar Springs Road is a road mainly in Uptown Dallas. The road also connects to Dallas Love Field and provides access to its terminal. It also once was a major thoroughfare through central Dallas and the Turtle Creek area in the early 1900s. Dallas Area Rapid Transit bus route 39 traversed much of the length of this road; however, in 2022, bus route 103 replaced it.

== Route description ==
The road's southern end is at North Field Street near the Victory Park neighborhood just north of Downtown Dallas. It travels northeast for two blocks, turning directly north at Akard Street while also becoming one-way northbound for two blocks past this. At Olive Street, it becomes two-way again, and leaves the downtown area for Uptown Dallas. It then passes under the Katy Trail, over Turtle Creek, and Turtle Creek Boulevard joins it about a block north from there. The two streets run multiplexed for two blocks on the west side of the creek, then split. Turtle Creek Boulevard continues north-northeast, while Cedar Springs Road turns northwest at Bowen Street. From here, the road runs through one of the financial cores of Dallas, and intersects with Oak Lawn Avenue. The road then cuts through the Oak Lawn neighborhood, and intersects with Wycliff Avenue. The road then crosses over the Dallas North Tollway. Farther northwest, the road intersects with Inwood Road and a few shopping centers. The road finally intersects with Mockingbird Lane and widens to six lanes, where it approaches the terminal at Dallas Love Field and its termination point. The portion north of Mockingbird leading to the airport terminal was renamed Herb Kelleher Way in 2014 in honor of the founder of Southwest Airlines.

== History ==
William Grigsby, a veteran of the Texas Revolution, sold 320 acres to John Cole in 1846 for $1 per acre. Cole built a store and other businesses on the property and established his medical practice. The community became known as Cedar Springs for its free flowing springs and cedar tree grove. It became a part of Dallas County that same year.

On Memorial Day 2014, from 10 a.m. to 3 p.m., 1.25 miles of Cedar Springs Road was blocked off, along with parts of Routh Street and Harwood Street to create a ciclovía, a pedestrian-only road.
