= Reverchon Park =

Public park in Dallas, Texas, US

Coordinates: 32°48′01.12″N 96°48′47.06″W

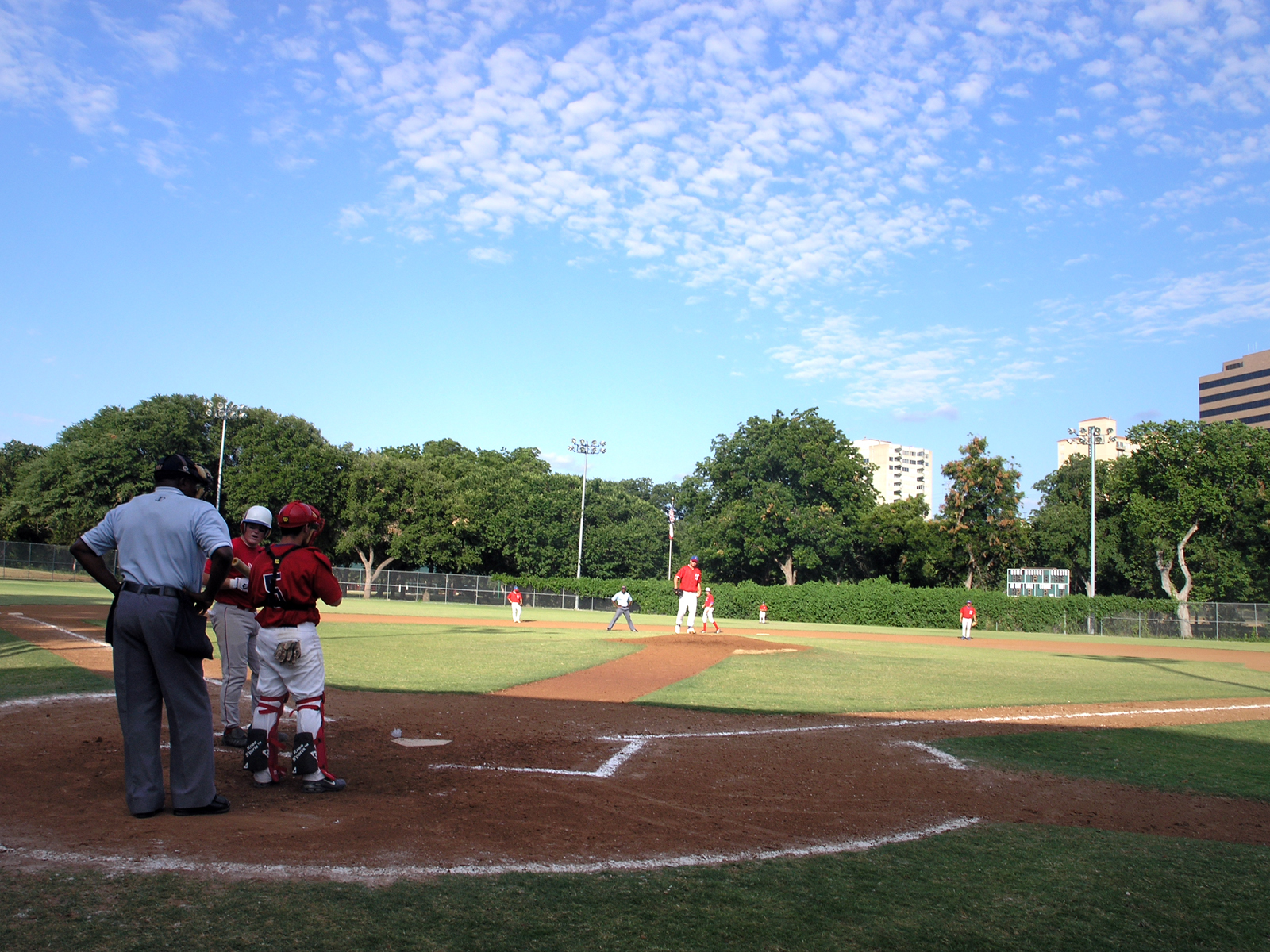
A baseball game at the park

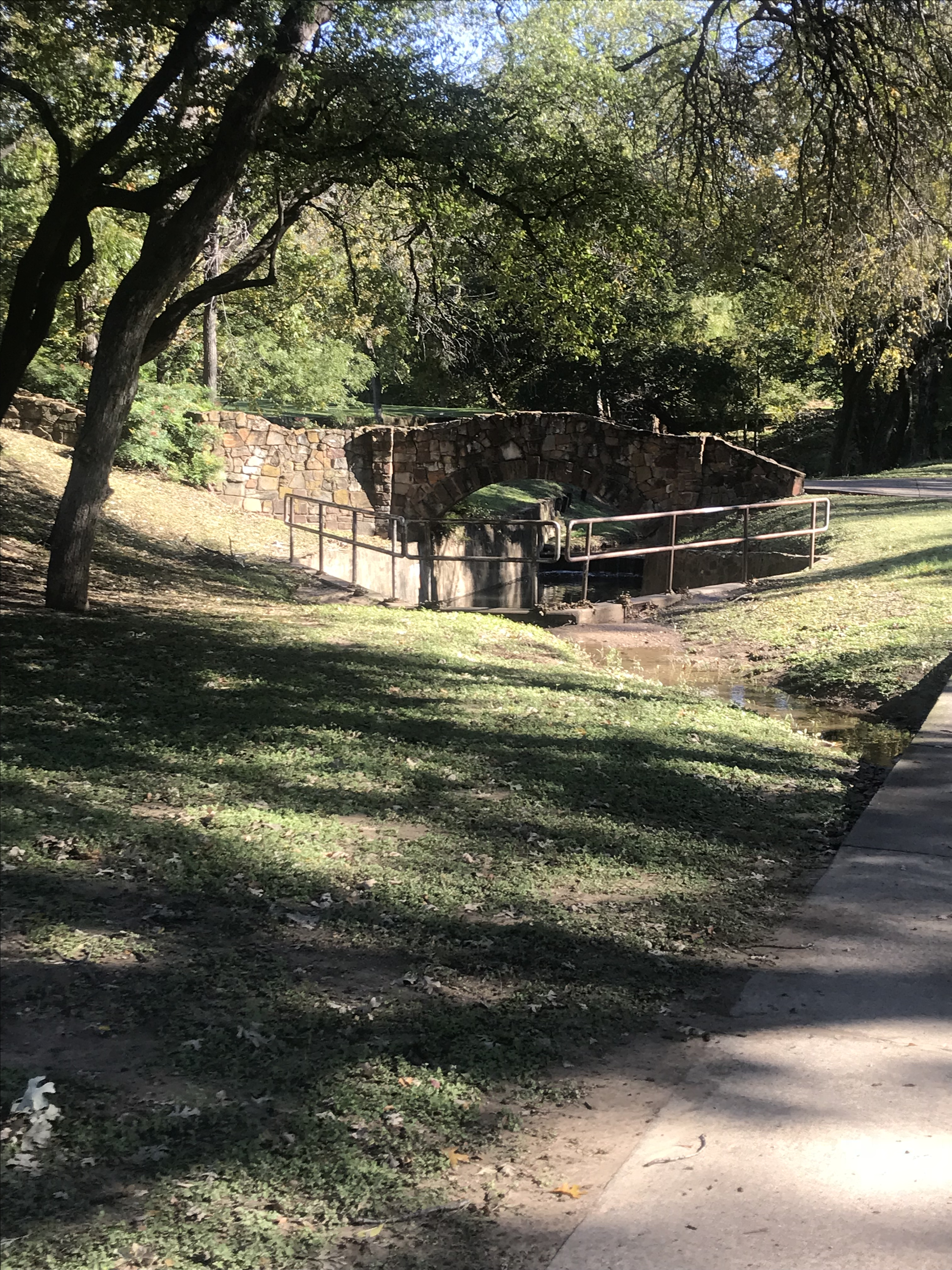
Bridge in Reverchon Park in the Oak Lawn area of Dallas, Texas

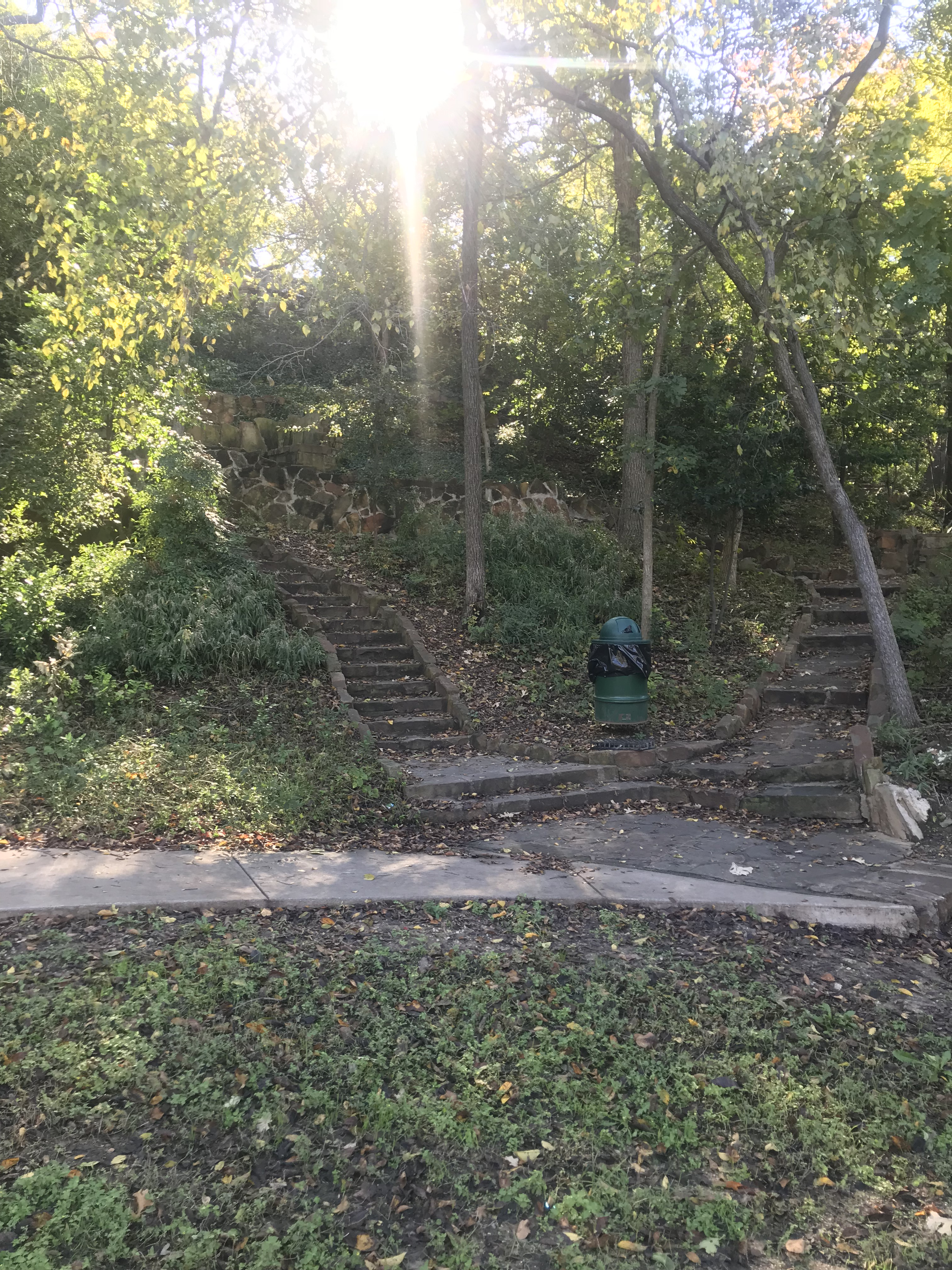
Steps connecting Reverchon Park to the Katy Trail in Dallas, Texas

Reverchon Park is a public park in the Oak Lawn area of Dallas, Texas. It was named for the French botanist Julien Reverchon.

The park lies along Turtle Creek, a tributary of the Trinity River. Its main entrance is at Maple Avenue and Turtle Creek Boulevard.

== History ==
Built in 1915, Reverchon Park is one of the oldest parks in the city. First named Turtle Creek Park, it was renamed Reverchon Park after Julien Reverchon (1837–1905), a botanist and a member of the La Reunion Utopian Community.

In the 80s and 90s, the park was notoriously crime-ridden, but a rejuvenation project beginning in 1998 helped turn Reverchon into one of Dallas' most successful parks, according to The Dallas Morning News.

The Southern Methodist University baseball team played at the ballpark from 1977 to 1980, before the baseball program disbanded after the 1980 season.

== Features ==
Reverchon Park is 46 acres (0.19 km^{2}) in area, and offers around 40 leisure and recreational program for citizens, including health screenings, tutoring, athletic leagues, yoga, volleyball, and after-school programs. The park also is home to baseball fields, basketball courts, and tennis courts.

A playground in the park, accessible to children of all abilities, was designed by the Texas Scottish Rite Hospital, the American Academy of Orthopedic Surgeons, and the City of Dallas.

A section of the Katy Trail, a recreational rail trail, runs adjacent to the park. It connects to parks of the Trinity River Project.

=== Ballpark ===
Reverchon Park includes a 3,500-capacity 1920s-era ballpark used for high-school and amateur baseball teams. It was the home field for Southern Methodist University baseball from 1977 to 1980.

In July 2018, plans were announced for a new multi-purpose stadium in the park to host a Dallas franchise in the independent Southwest League of Professional Baseball, as well as local high school playoff games, amateur baseball leagues, and the Mexican Baseball League. With the Southwest League never playing a game, in January 2020 the Dallas City Council approved a renovation proposal from a group led by Dallas Mavericks general manager Donnie Nelson who was also an owner of the Texas AirHogs of the independent American Association. The $10 million plan included new seating, artificial turf, locker rooms, dugouts, and concessions and restrooms facilities, all to accommodate professional and amateur baseball, soccer, lacrosse, concerts and rugby. In October 2020, the plan was reported to be dead when the group led by Nelson failed to submit documentation before a September 30 deadline.
