= P.C. Cobb Stadium =

Outdoor athletic stadium in Dallas, Texas

- Interactive map of P.C. Cobb Stadium
- Former names: Dal-Hi Stadium (1939–1957)
- Location: Dallas, Texas
- Coordinates: 32°48′03″N 96°49′11″W
- Owner: Dallas Independent School District
- Capacity: 22,000
- Acreage: 25

Construction
- Opened: 1939
- Demolished: 1981
- Architect: Hoke Smith
- Project manager: Work Projects Administration

Tenant
- Dallas Tornado (NASL) 1969

P.C. Cobb Stadium (previously Dal-Hi Stadium) was an outdoor athletic stadium near downtown Dallas, Texas. The 22,000 seat stadium, named in honor of the former Dallas Independent School District athletic director and coach, was built of reinforced concrete under the Works Progress Administration program in 1939 and was used for high school sporting events of the Dallas Independent School District. In 1969 it was the home of the Dallas Tornado, a professional soccer team in the now-defunct North American Soccer League. The 25-acre (100,000 m^{2}) site and stadium was sold and demolished to make way for the Dallas Infomart, built in 1985.

A planned trail dubbed "The Connection" that joins the Katy Trail to the Trinity Strand Trail will run through the former site of the stadium and incorporate material from the demolished structure into its retaining walls. Originally preserved by Infomart developer Trammell Crow, the material was later turned over to the city's Department of Parks and Recreation for storage.
