= Bump Wills =

American baseball player (born 1952)

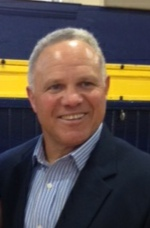
- Wills in 2014
- Second baseman
- Born: July 27, 1952 (age 74); Washington, D.C., U.S.
- Batted: Switch Threw: Right

Professional debut
- MLB: April 7, 1977, for the Texas Rangers
- NPB: April 9, 1983, for the Hankyu Braves

Last appearance
- MLB: October 3, 1982, for the Chicago Cubs
- NPB: August 4, 1984, for the Hankyu Braves

MLB statistics
- Batting average: .266
- Home runs: 36
- Runs batted in: 302
- Stolen bases: 196

NPB statistics
- Batting average: .259
- Home runs: 16
- Runs batted in: 81
- Stolen bases: 22
- Stats at Baseball Reference

Teams
- Texas Rangers (1977–1981); Chicago Cubs (1982); Hankyu Braves (1983–1984)

Elliott Taylor "Bump" Wills (born July 27, 1952) is an American former professional baseball player, a second baseman in the major leagues for the Texas Rangers (1977–1981) and Chicago Cubs (1982). He also played two seasons in Japan for the Hankyu Braves (1983–84).

Wills is the son of Maury Wills, a major league shortstop who later managed the Seattle Mariners.

== Playing career ==
A switch hitter, Wills played college baseball at Arizona State University under College Baseball Hall of Fame coach Jim Brock. As a major league rookie in 1977, he was on the cover of Sports Illustrated in March.

That season at Yankee Stadium, Wills and Ranger teammate Toby Harrah hit back-to-back inside-the-park home runs on Saturday, August 27, only the second time this feat has ever occurred in a major league game, and the only time on consecutive pitches. Harrah's came on a drive to the right-center field gap; on the play, Yankee outfielder Lou Piniella hit the wall and was injured. By the time another player was able to retrieve the ball, Harrah was being waved home. Wills' HR came on a drive to center field over the head of Mickey Rivers; both were off reliever Ken Clay. Earlier that year at spring training in Florida, Wills controversially replaced Lenny Randle at second base, which led to Randle's punching Rangers manager Frank Lucchesi in the face, sending him to the hospital with a facial fracture.

Like his father Maury, Wills was respected for his speed. In 1978, Wills stole 52 bases, breaking Dave Nelson's single-season franchise record of 51 in 1972; the number remains a Ranger record for stolen bases in a season.

After playing with the Chicago Cubs in 1982, Wills played the 1983–1984 seasons in Japan before retiring. His MLB career batting average was .266 with 36 home runs and 302 RBI.

== Personal life ==
Born in Washington, D.C., Wills grew up in Spokane, Washington, and graduated from Central Valley High School in 1970, where he was a three-sport star and later coached. He went to college at Arizona State University where he was a member of the Sigma Chi fraternity. He regularly managed clinics for younger players in the area as well.

In 1977, Bump married Laverne Capilla, with whom he had one child, daughter Mauricia Morning Wills (named after his father Maury). He and Laverne later divorced and Bump married Marla Boland in 1989. They had two daughters, Meagan and Madeline Wills. They subsequently divorced.

Wills now lives in Garland, Texas, with his wife Deborah (Shriver), whom he married in 2015. He coaches for the Dallas Mustangs, a youth select baseball club. He was slated to be the manager of the Royse City Griffins of the planned Southwest League of Professional Baseball in 2019, but the league folded before ever playing.

== See also ==
- List of Major League Baseball career stolen bases leaders
- List of second-generation Major League Baseball players
