= Katy Trail =

Katy Trail may refer to the following places in the United States:

- Katy Trail (Dallas) 3.5 mile trail in Dallas, Texas
- Katy Trail State Park, 240-mile trail across Missouri
