= Perry Heights, Dallas =

Perry Heights
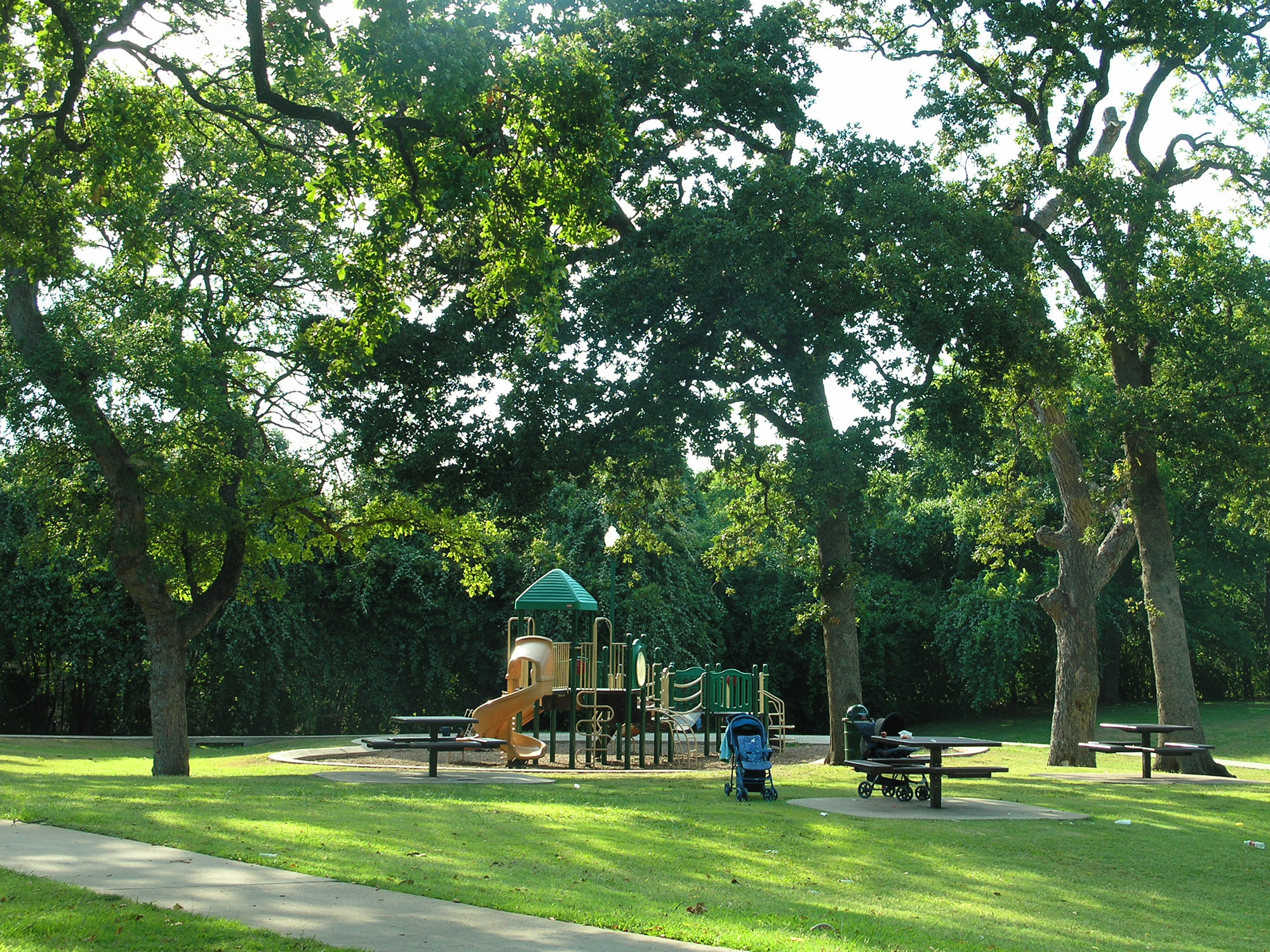
- Craddock Park, adjacent to the neighborhood, northwest across Hawthorne Avenue
- Country: United States
- State: Texas
- Counties: Dallas
- City: Dallas
- Area: Oak Lawn
- Elevation: 479 ft (146 m)
- ZIP code: 75219
- Area codes: 214, 469, 972

Perry Heights is a historical neighborhood in the Oak Lawn area of Dallas, Texas (USA). As one of the last remaining single-family neighborhoods in the Dallas uptown area, Perry Heights consists of three (Vandelia, Hall, and Rawlins) by three streets (Herschel, Prescott, and Hawthorne) of residential real estate with neighborhood restaurants and bars within walking distance. The neighborhood consists of 115 single-family homes. At last count, there are 69 homes remaining that were built in the 1920s, 10 were built in the 1930s, 8 in the 1940s, 10 in the 1950s, and the rest after the 1960s. Perry Heights was developed in 1922 by wealthy real estate investor and car dealership owner, E. Gordon Perry. It is bounded by Hawthorne Avenue on the northwest, Rawlins Street on the northeast, Wycliff Avenue on the southeast, and Vandelia Street on the southwest.

== Education ==
The neighborhood is served by the Dallas Independent School District. Children in the neighborhood attend Sam Houston Elementary School, Thomas J. Rusk Middle School, and North Dallas High School.

Nearby private schools include Holy Trinity Catholic School.
