= Knox Park, Dallas =

Knox / Henderson
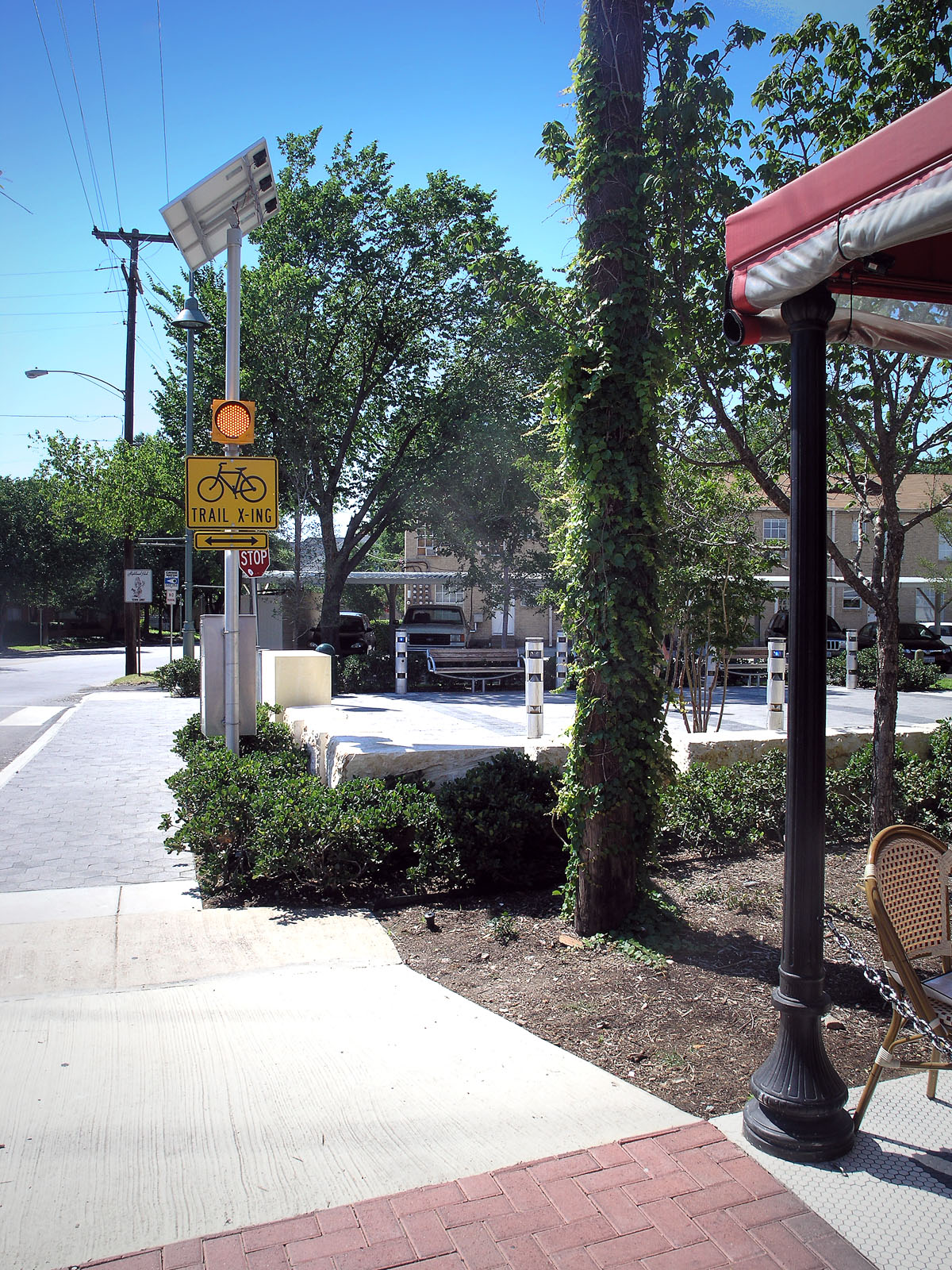
- The Katy Trail where it crosses Knox Street
- Country: United States
- State: Texas
- Counties: Dallas
- City: Dallas
- Area: Oak Lawn
- Elevation: 528 ft (161 m)
- ZIP code: 75205
- Area codes: 214, 469, 972

Knox / Henderson is a neighborhood in Dallas, Texas (USA). It is north of the Uptown neighborhood and east and south of the enclave of Highland Park. It is centered on Knox Street, Henderson Avenue, McKinney Avenue, and Cole Avenue. The area is home to many bars, restaurants, and shops. The Katy Trail also runs through the neighborhood.

== Transportation ==
=== Highways ===
- - North Central Expressway (US 75)

== Education ==
The district is zoned to schools in the Dallas Independent School District.

Residents of the district are zoned to Ben Milam Elementary School, Thomas J. Rusk Elementary School, and North Dallas High School.
