= Mockingbird Lane (Dallas) =

- Length: 10.6 mi (17.1 km)
- Location: Dallas, Texas
- West end: Trinity River
- Major junctions: I-35E / SH 183; Dallas North Tollway; SH 289; US 75
- East end: Loop 12 (Buckner Boulevard)

Mockingbird Lane is a road located mainly in central Dallas, Texas. It is one of three main arterial roads in this part of Dallas, and is also a major road through Highland Park.

== Route description ==
The road runs west from Buckner Boulevard at its eastern terminus, then travels westward past the Mockingbird Station area between Greenville Avenue and North Central Expressway, narrowing to two lanes as it forms the southern boundary of Southern Methodist University, crosses Hillcrest Avenue, and then passes over the Dallas North Tollway, then intersects with Inwood Road. From there, it curves southwestward, intersecting with Cedar Springs Road to give access to the terminal at Dallas Love Field Airport and forming the airport's southeastern boundary, past the University of Texas Southwestern Medical Center while forming the campus's northwestern boundary, has an interchange with Harry Hines Boulevard, curves to the west, and then again to the southwest as it passes under Interstate 35E and Texas State Highway 183. Finally, it intersects Irving Boulevard after curving due south, and the street becomes Westmoreland Road at the midpoint of its bridge over the Trinity River floodway into West Dallas. Further east, Mockingbird Lane becomes Peavy Road.

== History ==
After the construction of Mockingbird Station around 2002, developer Ken Hughes invested $600,000 in streetscape improvements for pedestrians. Unfortunately, the improvements made it worse for the pedestrians and half of the street lights were broken as of September 2012.

== Points of interest ==
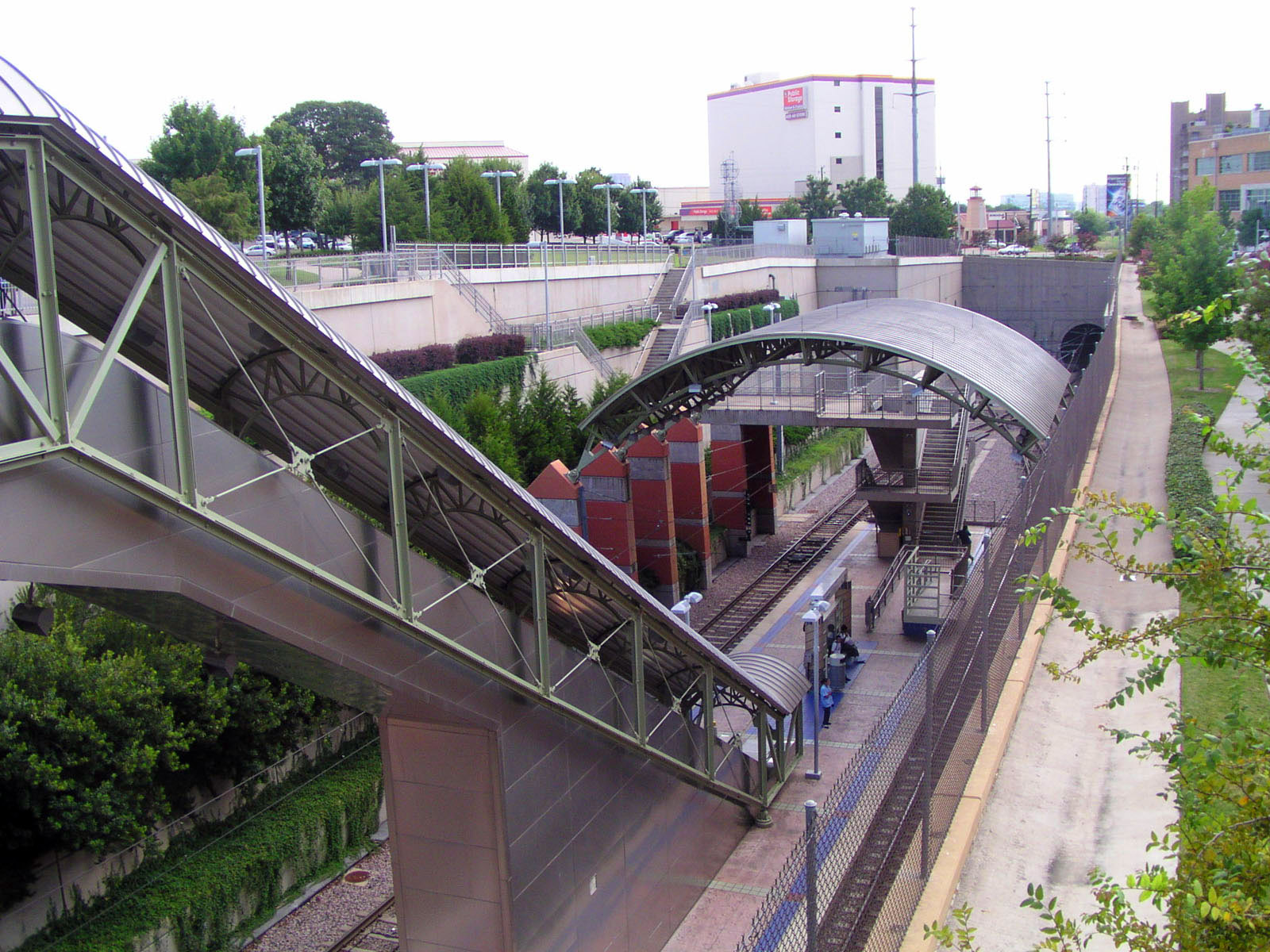
Mockingbird Station, the light rail platforms are in the foreground, the mall and parking in the background

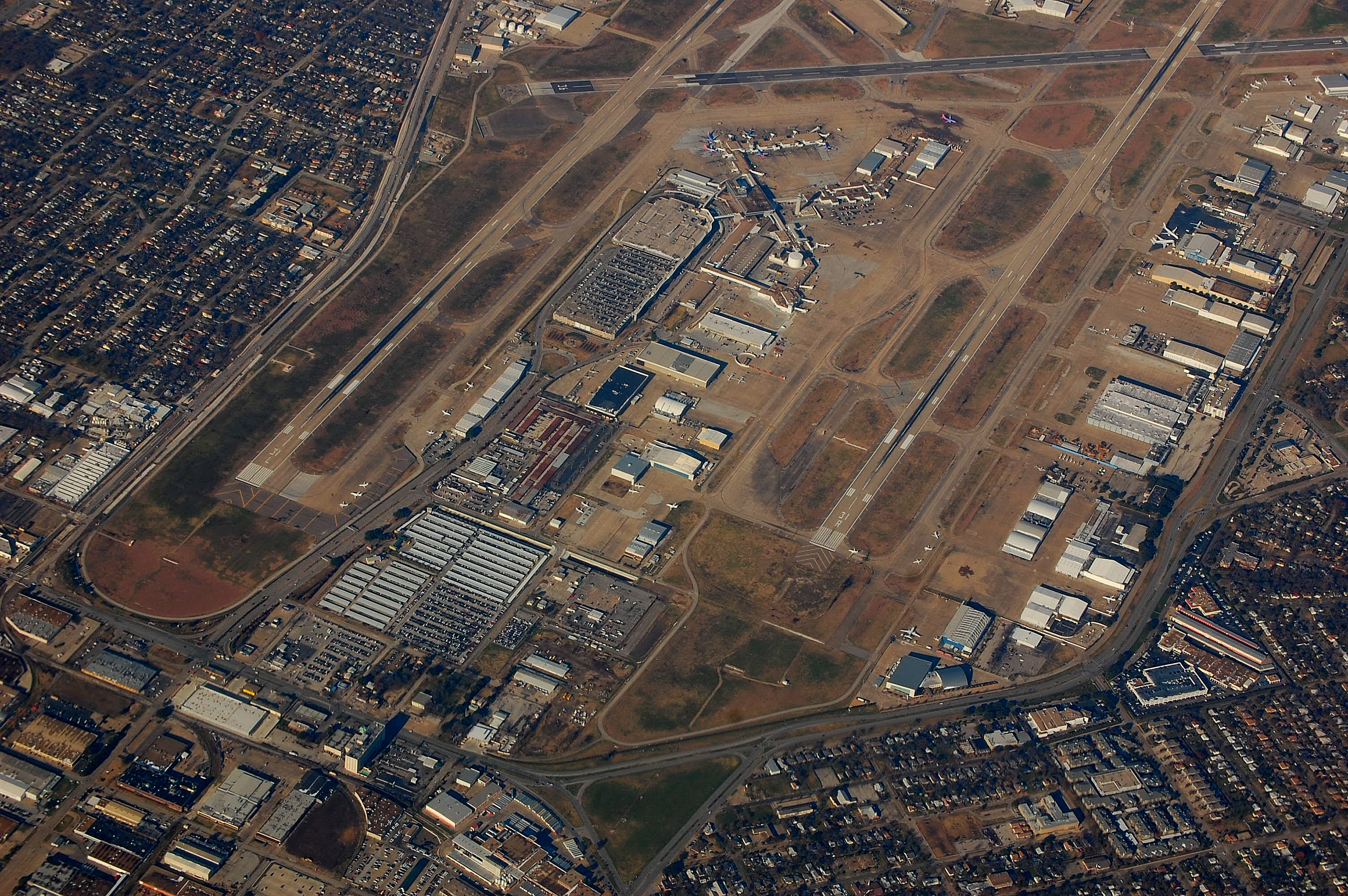
Dallas Love Field, Mockingbird Lane is the road furthest foreground, while Cedar Springs Road is the road connecting to the terminal

- Mockingbird Station, Texas's first successful transit-oriented development (TOD), is at Mockingbird Lane between Greenville Avenue and North Central Expressway. The station, built by Dallas Area Rapid Transit (DART), brought forth a mall, park, and new life to an area that was formerly not desired for development. "What has done most to kindle interest in Dallas’s growing (and increasingly traffic-choked) suburbs is the TOD success story at Mockingbird Station. North of downtown Dallas, the Mockingbird Station capitalized on private developer initiative, a good site, strong local demographics, and an abundance of adjacent regional attractions.". Also, the Mockingbird Station area has the highest density population within three miles of any mass transit station in Texas.
- Southern Methodist University is a private university in Highland Park. It is on the north side of Mockingbird Lane, between Airline Road and Hillcrest Avenue. Highland Park United Methodist Church is adjacent to the campus. The George W. Bush Presidential Library is on the campus just off of Mockingbird.
- Dallas Love Field, owned by the city of Dallas, is the second largest airport in the Dallas–Fort Worth metroplex, just behind DFW Airport. It is located at the intersection of Cedar Springs Road and Mockingbird, between I-35E and the Dallas North Tollway.
