= Turtle Creek News =

The Turtle Creek News, is a weekly newspaper that serves the upscale urban core of Dallas, Texas, U.S.A. This includes Downtown Dallas, Victory Park, Uptown Dallas, Park Cities and The Greater Turtle Creek Corridor of the city.

Established in 1992 the newspaper's fundamental distribution focus is the luxury highrise and midrise residential communities of the city, along with single copy distribution in Highland Park and University Park.

In the early years, the paper published news and information on a local, national and international scale.

In recent years, the newspaper has refined its focus to neighborhood news, local events, features and profiles.

As the only newspaper that is allowed exclusive access into the majority of the controlled access communities of the city, the publication has realized ongoing growth and success as the city's number of such communities has grown.

The niche publication's tens of thousands of readers include the city's most economically and culturally affluent consumers, many of whom are among the regions most sought after arts patrons and industry leaders.

The newspaper is published and distributed on Fridays.
