= Station 4 =

LGBTQ+ nightclub in Dallas, Texas

Coordinates: 32.8105°N 96.8110°W

Station 4 (often styled S4) is a large LGBTQ+ nightclub located in the Oak Lawn neighborhood of Dallas, Texas, United States. Situated at the corner of Cedar Springs Road and Throckmorton Street, an area known historically as "The Crossroads," the multi-venue complex spans between 24,000 and 29,000 square feet. It features multiple bars, a large dance floor with high-tech sound and lighting, patio spaces, and the notable drag venue, the Rose Room. Considered an institution within Dallas's LGBTQ+ community, Station 4 represents the fourth iteration of a Caven Enterprises venue at this central location, tracing its lineage back through previous clubs like Village Station and The Old Plantation.

== History ==
=== Caven Enterprises and early venues (late 1960s - 1970s) ===
The history of Station 4 is intertwined with Caven Enterprises, founded by nightclub pioneer Frank Caven. Caven began opening bars in Texas in the 1960s and established a significant presence in Dallas by the 1970s, particularly at the Cedar Springs/Throckmorton intersection, which Caven Enterprises has occupied for over 50 years.

One of Caven's key early Dallas ventures, co-founded with Charley Hott, was The Old Plantation. Originally downtown, it relocated to the current S4 site on Cedar Springs Road after its land was acquired for the Dallas Museum of Art. The Old Plantation faced significant adversity, including reported incidents of arson, sabotage, and persistent Police harassment, but thrived as a popular community space. It hosted events like a performance by Bonnie Pointer in 1984.

=== Village Station era (c. 1980s - 2004) ===
The Old Plantation was eventually rebranded as Village Station. According to Caven Enterprises event manager Chris Bengston, this involved relocations, first occupying a building later used by other businesses (and Caven's former 4001 disco), before settling at the current S4 address on Cedar Springs Road in the 1990s. Village Station became a well-known institution throughout the 1980s and 1990s. The Rose Room drag venue was established within Village Station in 1986.

This period was also marked by significant conflict with law enforcement. Village Station was frequently targeted for police harassment, including raids and intimidation tactics like recording patrons' license plates. A notable incident on October 24, 1979, involved the arrest of Richard Schwiderski and five others inside the club by undercover Dallas Police Department officers for "public lewdness" (allegedly for same-sex dancing). Schwiderski's legal challenge, supported by the Dallas Gay Alliance (DGA, later the Dallas Gay & Lesbian Alliance), drew attention to the harassment. Protest graffiti appeared on the building in 1980. The DGA's Social Justice Committee documented these incidents, leading to dialogue with police leadership and eventual improvements in police-community relations.

Village Station also served as a central gathering point during the peak years of the AIDS crisis in the 1980s and early 1990s. While specific bar initiatives are not detailed, venues like Village Station functioned as vital community hubs for information sharing, support, and solidarity when institutional resources were scarce. Nearby, the AIDS Resource Center (now Resource Center) was established, providing essential services.

=== Transformation into Station 4 (2004) ===
In late 2004, Caven Enterprises undertook a "mammoth remodeling project" to transform Village Station into the larger, modernized Station 4. This "face lift" involved expanding the physical space, adding a front balcony and a no-smoking room, installing new lighting and sound systems, and updating the decor with metal plating. The goal was to create a state-of-the-art "juggernaut" for the 21st century.

The grand opening occurred during the holiday season of late 2004, confirmed by S4 celebrating its 20th anniversary on November 23, 2024. This rebranding coincided with efforts to promote Dallas as an LGBTQ+ travel destination, with S4 positioned as a modern superclub.

=== Venue evolution timeline ===
Simplified Venue Lineage at 3911 Cedar Springs Rd.
Era / Approx. Dates	Venue Name	Key Events / Context
1970s - Early 1980s	The Old Plantation	Founded by Caven/Hott; Moved from downtown; Faced police harassment; Hosted Bonnie Pointer (1984)
Early 1980s - Mid 1990s	Village Station	Rebranded from Old Plantation; Schwiderski arrest/police harassment focus (1979-80s); Rose Room established (1986)
Mid 1990s - Late 2004	Village Station	Continued operation at current location; Central gathering place during peak AIDS crisis years
Late 2004 - Present	Station 4 (S4)	Major remodel & rebranding from Village Station; Rose Room expansion (2004); 20th Anniversary (2024)

== The Station 4 experience ==
Station 4 provides a large, multi-faceted nightlife environment. The main level features a large dance floor with advanced sound and light systems. Multiple bars (reportedly 15-17) serve patrons throughout. Upstairs, the Granite Bar offers lounge seating with views of the dance floor, while a large outdoor patio provides additional space.

The club primarily plays DJ-driven dance music, featuring both local and international DJs. It attracts a diverse crowd of LGBTQ+ people and allies, often noted for its welcoming atmosphere.

== The Rose Room ==
A major component of S4 is the Rose Room, a renowned drag show venue located upstairs. Established in 1986 within Village Station, it is considered one of the premier drag stages in the U.S.

The original Rose Room was smaller; the 2004 S4 renovation significantly expanded it into a large cabaret theater with a raised stage, multi-level seating, lounge area, bar, backstage, and dedicated restrooms. It received another major update around 2016.

The Rose Room has hosted top-tier female impersonators, including winners of national pageants like Miss Gay America, Miss Gay USofA, and Miss Continental. It has been a home stage for Dallas drag icons like Valerie Lohr, Cassie Nova (longtime show director), Krystal Summers, Layla LaRue, and Maya Douglas. It has also served as a launching pad for numerous performers who later competed on RuPaul's Drag Race, including Alyssa Edwards, Kennedy Davenport, Asia O'Hara, Sahara Davenport, Plastique Tiara, Ra'Jah O'Hara, and A'keria C. Davenport. Regular shows continue weekly, featuring the resident cast and amateur nights.

=== Notable Rose Room performers & alumni ===
This list is not exhaustive
Performer Name	Notable For / Connection	Approx. Era Associated
Valerie Lohr	Longtime resident (20+ yrs by 2007); Miss Gay America system	1980s - 2000s+
Cassie Nova	Longtime performer/Show Director (23+ yrs by 2016); Comedian	1990s - Present
Krystal Summers	Fan favorite; Pageant performer	2000s - Present
Layla LaRue	Dancer; Pageant performer	2000s
Maya Douglas	Pageant performer	2000s
Alyssa Edwards	RuPaul's Drag Race (S5, AS2); Miss Gay USofA 2006	2000s - 2010s
Kennedy Davenport	RuPaul's Drag Race (S7, AS3); Miss Gay USofA 2019	2000s - 2010s
Asia O'Hara	RuPaul's Drag Race (S10); Miss Gay USofA 2007	2000s - 2010s
Sahara Davenport	RuPaul's Drag Race (S2)	2000s
Plastique Tiara	RuPaul's Drag Race (S11)	2010s
Ra'Jah O'Hara	RuPaul's Drag Race (S11, AS6)	2010s
A'keria C. Davenport	RuPaul's Drag Race (S11, AS6); Miss Black Universe	2010s

== Community role ==
Station 4 serves as a central gathering place for the Dallas LGBTQ+ community, continuing the historical role of The Crossroads as a sanctuary. It hosts significant community events, including the monthly Gaybingo fundraiser for Resource Center, held at the venue for over 23 years. The Dallas Way, an LGBTQ+ history preservation group, has also used the Rose Room for its "Outrageous Oral" storytelling events.

=== Discrimination accusations ===
The venue's history includes documented accusations of racial discrimination, particularly during the transition from Village Station to S4 around 2004-2005. Reports from that time alleged that Black patrons faced unfair scrutiny or denial of entry. Caven Enterprises has stated these issues pertain to past decades.

== Ownership and future ==
Development proposals for the area have emerged, including a plan by developer Mike Ablon to build residential towers on the parking lots behind S4 and other Caven venues, while aiming to preserve the existing bar structures. This has sparked community discussion about preserving the neighborhood's character amidst urban growth. Station 4 remains fully operational during these discussions.

== See also ==
- Oak Lawn, Dallas
- LGBT culture in Dallas
