= International Center, Dallas =

Coordinates: 32°47′35.58″N 96°48′27.61″W

International Center is a neighborhood of high-rise office and residential buildings in the Oak Lawn area of Dallas, Texas (USA). The land in the neighborhood is owned primarily by Harwood International, a development firm based in Dallas. The area is in proximity to Victory Park, Uptown, and the Arts District of downtown, three highly popular districts in Central Dallas. Like its neighborhoods, International Center is experiencing large amounts of growth in both the commercial and residential sectors.
