= Turtle Creek, West Virginia =

- Unincorporated community
- Location within West Virginia Location within the United States
- Coordinates: 38°01′47″N 81°52′22″W
- Country: United States
- State: West Virginia
- County: Boone
- Elevation: 797 ft (243 m)
- Time zone: UTC-5 (Eastern (EST))
  - Summer (DST): UTC-4 (EDT)
- ZIP code: 25203
- Area codes: 304 & 681
- GNIS feature ID: 1555842

Turtle Creek is an unincorporated community in Boone County, West Virginia, United States. Turtle Creek is located along U.S. Route 119, 3.5 miles (5.6 km) southwest of Madison. Turtle Creek has a post office with ZIP code 25203.

A post office has been in operation in Turtle Creek since 1858. The community was named after Turtle Creek, which runs through it.
