= Southwest League of Professional Baseball =

Formerly planned US independent professional baseball league

- Sport: Baseball
- Founded: 2016
- Folded: 2019
- No. of teams: 4
- Country: USA

The Southwest League of Professional Baseball was a planned independent professional baseball league. The first two announced teams were the Waco BlueCats and the Royse City Griffins followed by the Joplin Miners. In July 2018, it was announced that the Southwest League planned to play a 112-game schedule in 2019. However, the 2019 season was canceled.

== Announced franchises ==
As late as July 2018 the league continued to say it would begin operations with six teams, but only four teams were ever announced. The Joplin franchise defaulted on their lease with Joplin, Missouri for non-payment in January 2019. The league's contract with Joplin called for a schedule of play and disclosure of the leagues' two other teams by October 15, 2018. The league said in January 2019 that this had been done privately pending final details.

Announced teams for 2019
Team	First Season	City/Area	Stadium	Capacity
Joplin Miners	2019	Joplin, Missouri	Joe Becker Stadium	4,200
Royse City Griffins	2019	Royse City, Texas	Royse City Ballpark	
Waco BlueCats	2019	Bellmead, Texas	Bellmead Ballpark	
Dallas	2019	Dallas, Texas	Reverchon Park	

Planned team locations
