= Turtle Creek (West Virginia) =

Stream in Boone County, West Virginia, U.S.

Coordinates: 38°04′54″N 81°50′15″W

Turtle Creek is a stream in Boone County, West Virginia, in the United States.

Turtle Creek was so named from rock formations in the shape of turtle which occur on the river bed.

== See also ==
- Turtle Creek, West Virginia - a small community located beside the creek
- List of rivers of West Virginia
