= Dadnab =

Dadnab is a free text-messaging service that provides transit information in several major metropolitan areas throughout the United States. Users of this service can use any text-message enabled cell phone or any other text-messaging device to send a request for information to one of Dadnab's phone numbers, and they can expect an instantaneous response.

Dadnab relies on transit authority databases for the information that it provides. Queries can cover trip planning, location information, or help requests. Typically, a Dadnab user will send a text message with an origin and destination to one of Dabnab's phone numbers, and will receive a text message seconds later with routes, stops, departure, transfer and arrival times. Users can also specify desired departure times in their queries.

Roger L. Cauvin, founder and operator of the service, is a longtime resident of Austin, Texas and a frequent user of public transportation.

== Service areas ==
By July 2007, Dadnab served the New York, New Jersey, and Connecticut tri-state region in addition to Austin, Boston, Chicago, Dallas, Houston, the San Francisco Bay Area, and Seattle, drawing on scheduled information from a coalition of 16 transit and public safety agencies in the tri-state area alone. The service was extended to Southern California in March 2009, and by February 2010 had added dedicated phone numbers for each of the ten regions it served.

== Reception ==
In 2009, Dadnab received the Take on Traffic award in the small-business category at the Greater Austin Chamber of Commerce's Greater Austin Business Awards, which honors businesses that reduce traffic and vehicle miles traveled. In 2010, the service was promoted to attendees of the Austin City Limits Music Festival as a way to navigate transportation during the event. In 2011, the Austin chapter of the Conference of Minority Transportation Officials (COMTO) honored Dadnab with its Small Business of the Year award at its inaugural Transportation Awards Banquet.

== Service Areas ==
- Austin, TX
- San Francisco Bay Area
- Chicago, IL
- Dallas, TX
- Houston, TX
- Portland, OR
- Seattle, WA
- Southern California
- Tri-state NY/NJ/CT Area
- Boston, MA
