= Trinity Strand Trail =

Trinity Strand Trail Map

The Trinity Strand Trail is a partially completed 7.8-mile-long (12.6 km), hike/bike commuter and recreational trail that would run along the course of the original Trinity River in Dallas, Texas near the Dallas Design District. The trail is intended to connect the Dallas medical district with the Katy Trail and the Trinity River Corridor.

As of 2011, the project had received approximately US$8 million from the city of Dallas bonds and the North Central Texas Council of Governments combined. Trail construction began in 2010 and a 2.5-mile-long (4.0 km) segment was finished in 2014 at a cost of $5.4 million.

The trail is supported by a non-profit organization Friends of the Trinity Strand Trail, formed in 2002. The non-profit is partnered with another local non-profit, Friends of the Katy Trail, to connect the trail with Katy Trail. A land donation valued at $2 million was secured for the connection in 2007.
