= Plug-in electric vehicles in Texas =

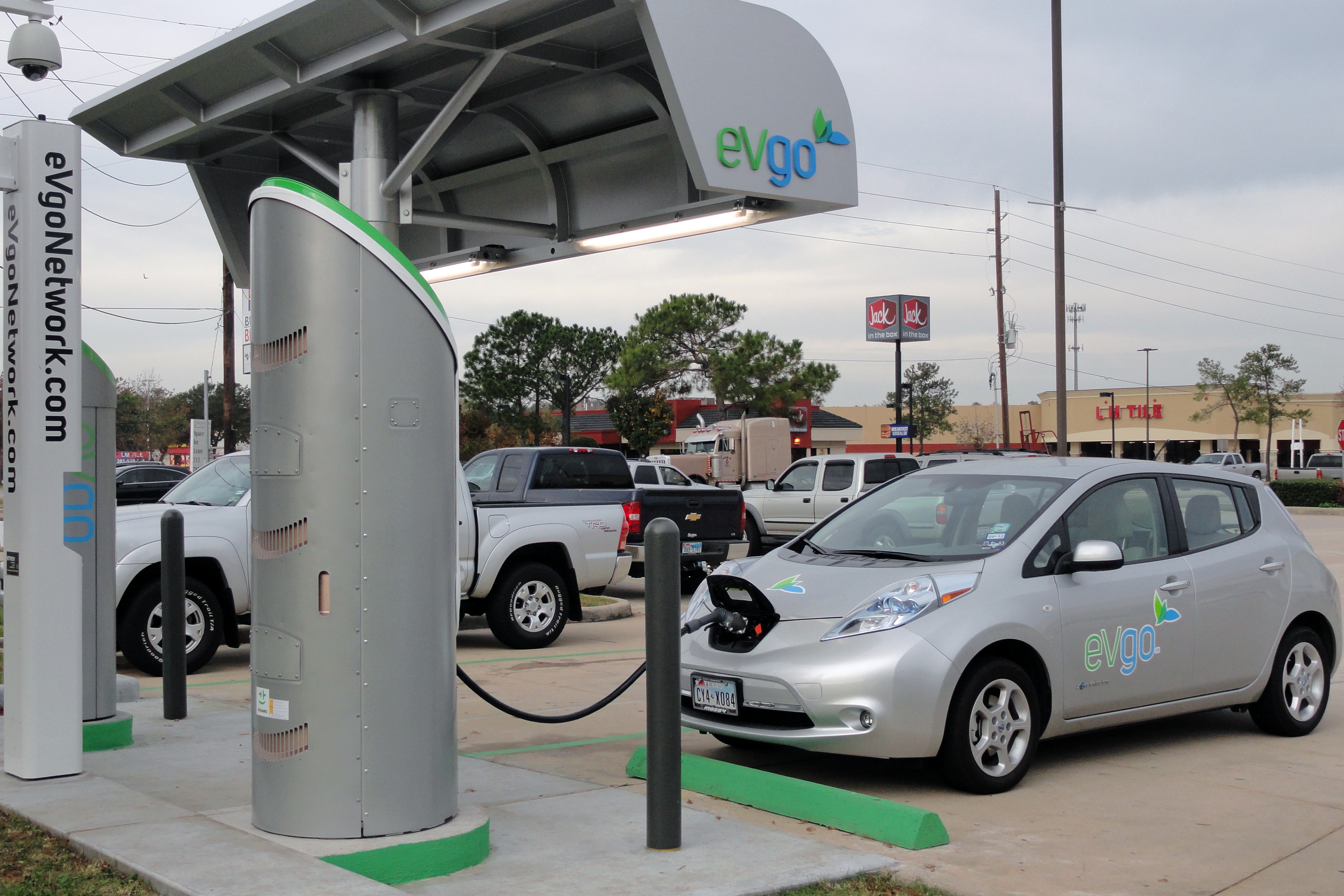
Nissan Leaf charging in Houston

As of 18 April 2023, there were 185,511 electric vehicles registered in Texas.

== Government policy ==
In November 2013, the Texas Commission on Environmental Quality approved a rebate program to provide financial incentives up to $2,500 for the purchase or lease of new eligible vehicles powered by compressed natural gas (CNG), liquefied petroleum gas (LPG), or plug-in electric drive with battery capacity larger than 4 kWh, from a licensed dealer or leasing company. Total funding for the program was US$7.7 million, and the maximum number of vehicles allowed was 2,000 units for each plug-in electric drive and natural gas/propane vehicles for the length of the program. The program was in effect from May 13, 2014 until June 26, 2015.

As of May 2022, the state government offers tax rebates of $2,500 for electric vehicle purchases.

As of May 2022, the state government charges a $150 annual registration fee for electric vehicles.

== Charging stations ==
As of August 2022, there were about 2,500 public charging station locations in Texas.

As of 1 September 2021, charging stations are not considered electric utilities or providers for the purposes of state government regulation.

The Infrastructure Investment and Jobs Act, signed into law in November 2021, allocated US$408 million to be spent on charging stations in Texas.

There have been concerns about the reliability of Texas's electrical grid with regards to charging electric vehicles.

== Public opinion ==
In a poll conducted in March 2022 by Texas 2036 about how many registered voters "have bought or considered buying" an electric vehicle, the number of affirmative respondents was 53% for people age 18–34, 56% for age 35–44, 34% for age 45–54, and 20% for age 55+.

== By region ==
=== Amarillo ===
As of 2019, there were around six public charging stations in Amarillo.

=== Austin ===
As of April 2023, Travis County has the second highest number of electric vehicles and charging stations of any Texas metropolitan area. As of April 2023, there were 25,148 electric vehicles registered in Travis County.

As of June 2022, there were about 1,300 charging stations in Austin.

=== Beaumont–Port Arthur ===
As of June 2022, there were five public charging stations in Jefferson County.

=== Dallas–Fort Worth ===
As of 18 April 2023, there are about 19,167 electric vehicles in registered in Dallas County, 18,025 in Collin County, 13,026 in Tarrant County, 12,446 in Denton County, 1,017 in Rockwall County, 844 in Ellis County, 758 in Parker County, 610 in Johnson County, 696 in Kaufman County, 245 in Hunt County, and 170 in Wise County.

As of August 2021, electric vehicle automaker Rivian has plans to open a manufacturing facility in southwest Tarrant County. If opened, the facility would be the largest car manufacturing facility in the state.

=== El Paso ===
As of 2021, there were about 1,800 electric vehicles registered in El Paso County. As of February 2022, the county had 66 charging stations.

=== Houston ===
As of July 2022, there were about 19,000 electric vehicles in Harris County, with about 13,000 being registered in the city of Houston.

As of September 2021, the Houston city government had 40 electric cars in its fleet. The city plans to transition all of its light-duty vehicles to electric by 2030.

In August 2021, Houston Metro announced its intentions to transition the agency's bus fleet to all-electric by 2030.

=== Laredo ===
As of April 2022, there were 264 electric vehicles registered in Webb County.

=== Longview ===
As of October 2022, there were 205 electric vehicles registered in Gregg County.

=== Lubbock ===
As of June 2022, there were 709 electric vehicles registered in Lubbock County.

As of 2019, there were around six public charging stations in Lubbock.

=== Midland ===
As of April 2022, there were 205 electric vehicles registered in Midland County.

=== San Angelo ===
As of May 2022, there were seven public charging stations in San Angelo.

=== San Antonio ===
San Antonio opened its first AC level 2 charging station in September 2021.

=== Tyler ===
As of October 2022, there were 538 electric vehicles registered in Smith County.

=== Waco ===
As of June 2022, there were five fully electric vehicles in the Waco city fleet.
