= Turtle Creek (Dallas County, Texas) =

Creek in Texas, United States of America

Coordinates: 32°51′N 96°48′W

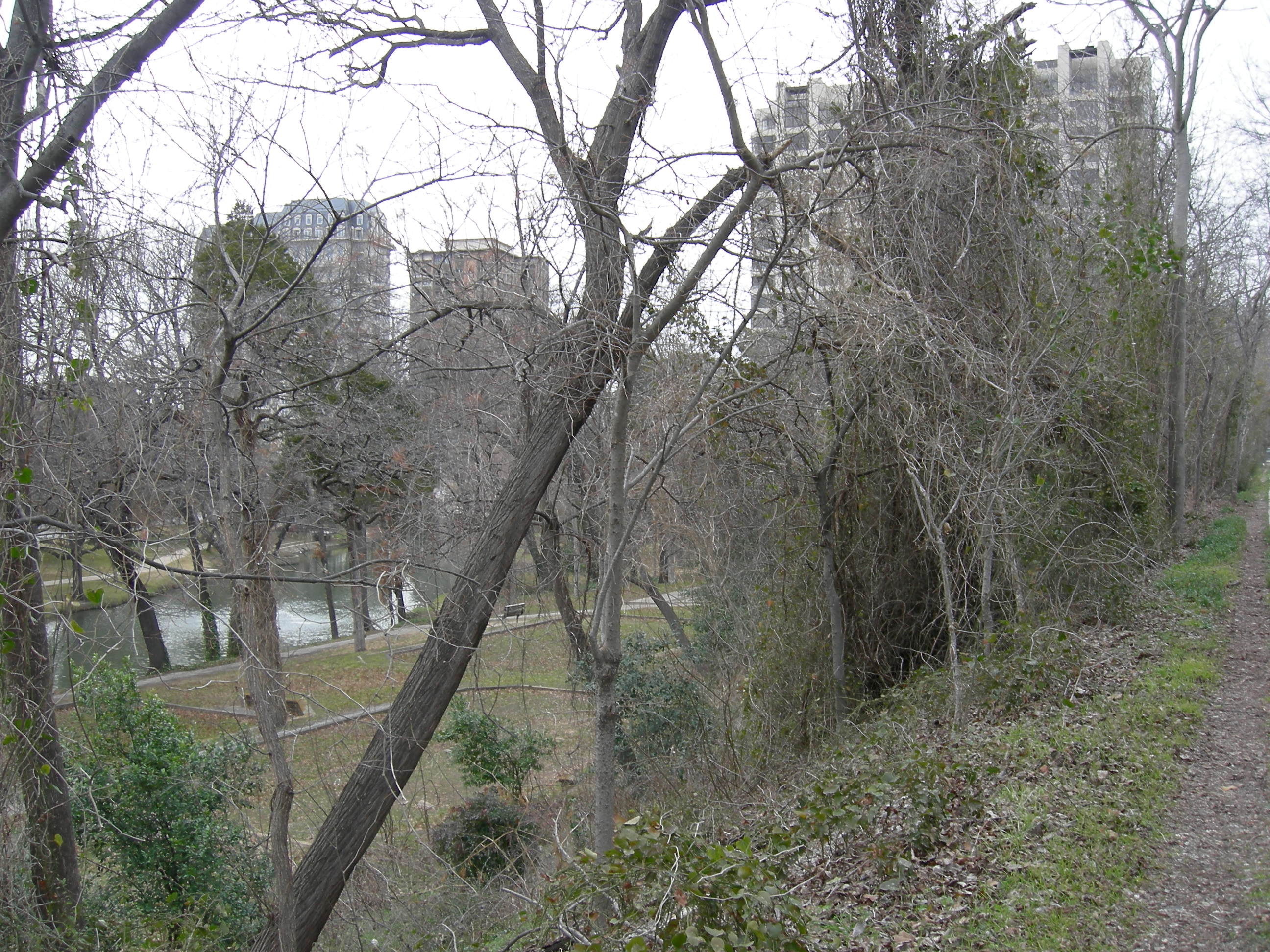
- Turtle Creek in Dallas

Location
- Country: United States
- State: Texas
- County: Dallas County

Turtle Creek is the name of small tributary creek of the Trinity River, with headwaters in northern Dallas, in Dallas County, Texas.

== Course ==
Turtle Creek generally runs southwest through North Dallas, passing through Highland Park (an incorporated city and enclave surrounded by Dallas), then back into Dallas through the Oak Lawn community and Turtle Creek neighborhood alongside Turtle Creek Boulevard, through Reverchon Park, and ultimately through the West Dallas Design District where it flows into the Trinity River Meanders culverts.

The Meanders are the original riverbed of the Trinity River through Dallas. For flood control purposes, the Meanders section was rerouted through underground culverts in the early 20th century. The main riverbed was also redirected through a new channel excavated to the west. The channel was engineered with levees and pumps, allowing real estate development of an industrial district in the area.

== See also ==
- Trinity River (Texas)
- List of rivers of Texas
