= Turtle Creek (Matagorda County, Texas) =

Coordinates: 28°43′N 96°16′W

- Map

Location
- Country: United States
- State: Texas
- County: Matagorda County

Physical characteristics
- Length: 12.5 m (41 ft)

Turtle Creek is a creek that rises west of Blessing, Texas (USA) in western Matagorda County. It runs 12.5 miles (20 km) southwest to Turtle Bay, west of Palacios.

== See also ==
- List of rivers of Texas
