= Turtle Creek Boulevard =

Coordinates: 32.802494°N 96.808509°W

Turtle Creek Boulevard is a thoroughfare that runs through the Turtle Creek neighborhood of Oak Lawn, Dallas, Texas (USA), generally alongside the actual Turtle Creek. The street has been broken up by dedication of Reverchon Park and by construction of the interstate, but its continuation through the Design District provides a hint of the culverted creek running beneath the streets.

Turtle Creek Boulevard shares a single block along the creek with Cedar Springs Road, a vestige of earlier times when natural urban growth converged the two streets. There is also a Turtle Creek Plaza, a largely private drive on the opposite bank of the creek from the boulevard where fancy homes have stood. Some stand no longer, though with gentrification of the neighborhood, land values are appreciating. The neighborhood has changed rapidly, becoming much more densely populated (it ranked as the fastest growing neighborhood in the U.S. in 2001-02 in terms of new dwelling units) and new, expensive homes have begun to be built along this secluded section.
