= Turtle Creek, Dallas =

Neighborhood of Dallas, Texas, United States

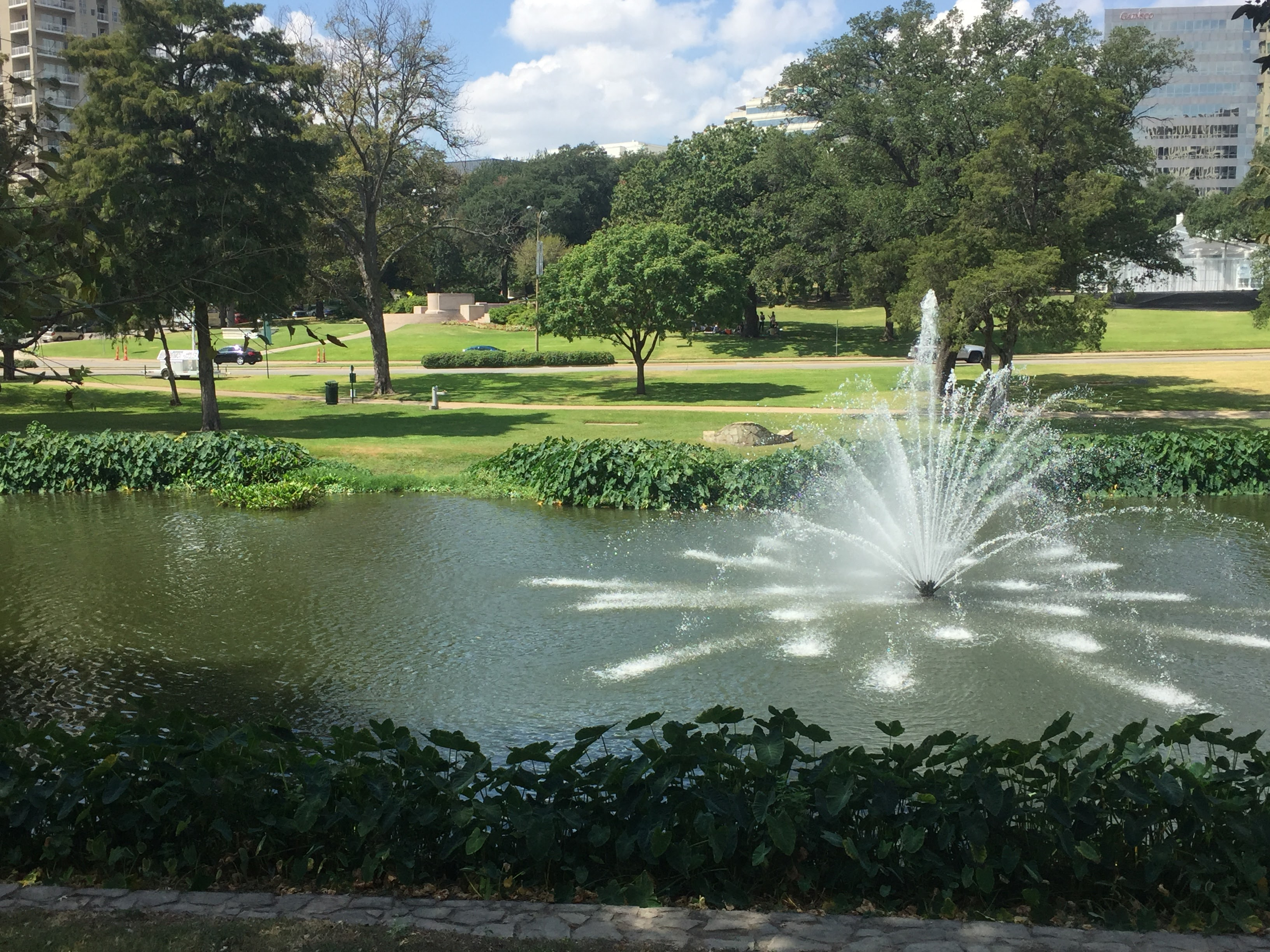
Turtle Creek Park in 2017, with the empty plinth of the removed statue of Robert E. Lee in the background (since demolished)

Turtle Creek is a neighborhood running along Turtle Creek and adjacent Turtle Creek Boulevard in the Oak Lawn area of Dallas, Texas (USA).

Turtle Creek has also become an adopted nickname for the Oak Lawn neighborhood, though never an official one. The nickname also sometimes applies to a spillover of the Uptown area, which has become the official moniker for the area between downtown Dallas and Oak Lawn beginning in the 1980s. (In actuality, however, Uptown itself is a part of the Oak Lawn district, as is the Turtle Creek neighborhood.)

The name Turtle Creek also graces a number of business and real estate properties in the area, many of which have addresses away from Turtle Creek Boulevard. There is even a Turtle Creek News which is published twice weekly and circulated in Uptown, Oak Lawn and Highland Park.

== Media ==
The Dallas Morning News is the Dallas citywide newspaper.

Park Cities People is a local community newspaper.
