= Katy Trail (Dallas) =

Bicycling and hiking path in Dallas, Texas

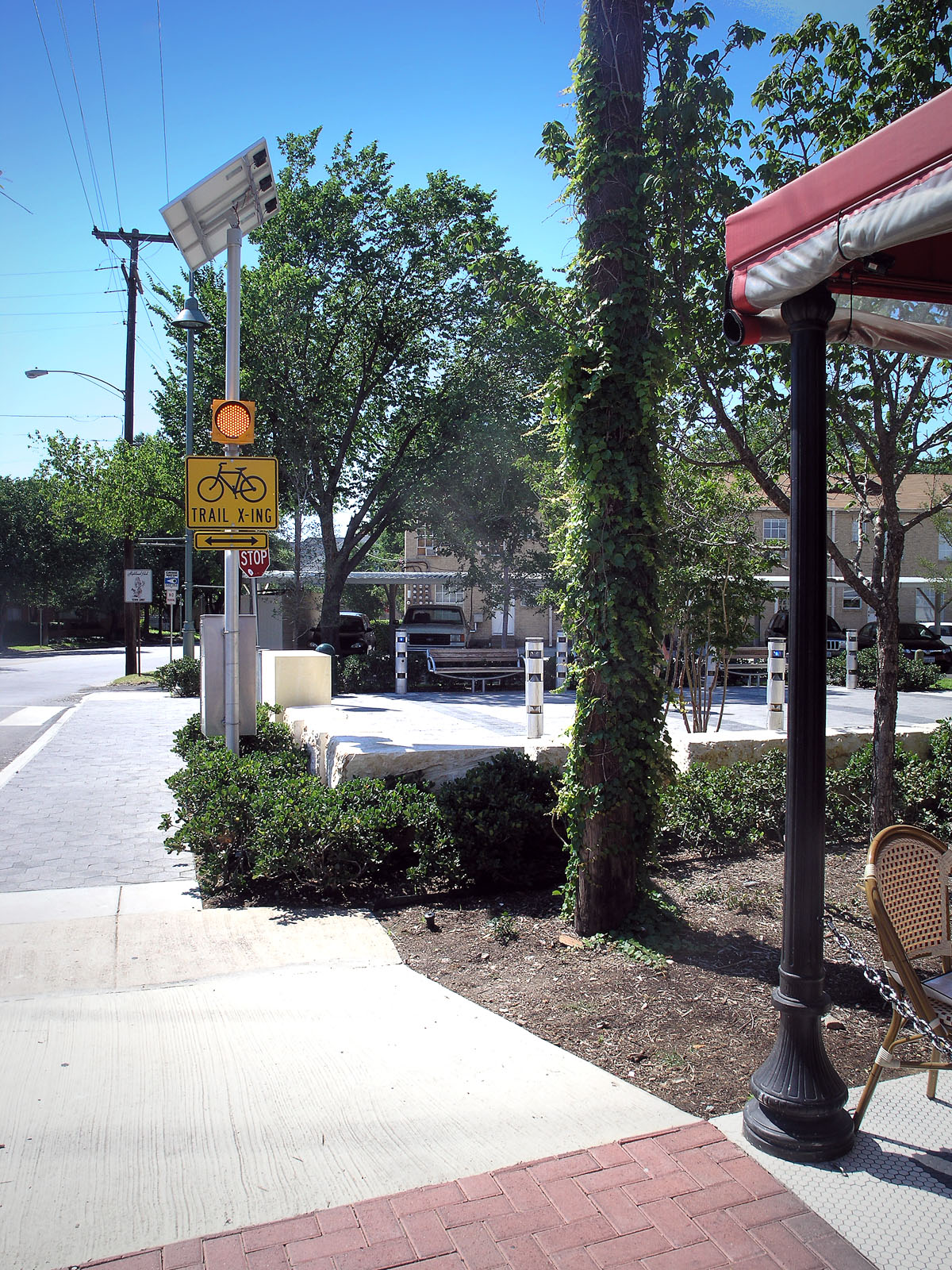
The Katy Trail where it crosses Knox Street in Knox Park

The Katy Trail is a rail trail that runs through the Uptown and Oak Lawn areas of Dallas, Texas (USA). It follows the former rail bed of the Missouri-Kansas-Texas Railroad, previously known as the MKT road or "Katy".

== About ==
In Dallas, abandoned railroad tracks that once divided the downtown core are being transformed into the unifying Katy Trail, a linear, 3.5-mile long (5.6 km) landscaped trail system that runs through the most densely-developed section of the city. Construction on the trail began in the spring of 2000. As of 2022, several features have already been completed, including the 12-foot wide (3.7 m) primary trail, two of four planned entrance plazas, and four of the six planned pedestrian bridges. Construction was completed in 2007 on the Thomsen Overlook plaza, overlooking Reverchon Park. An 8-foot wide (2.4 m) secondary jogging trail has 1 mile (1.6 km) left of construction, which will be completed once more funding is secured. The work is being carried out by The Friends of Katy Trail under a master plan created by The SWA Group office in Dallas.

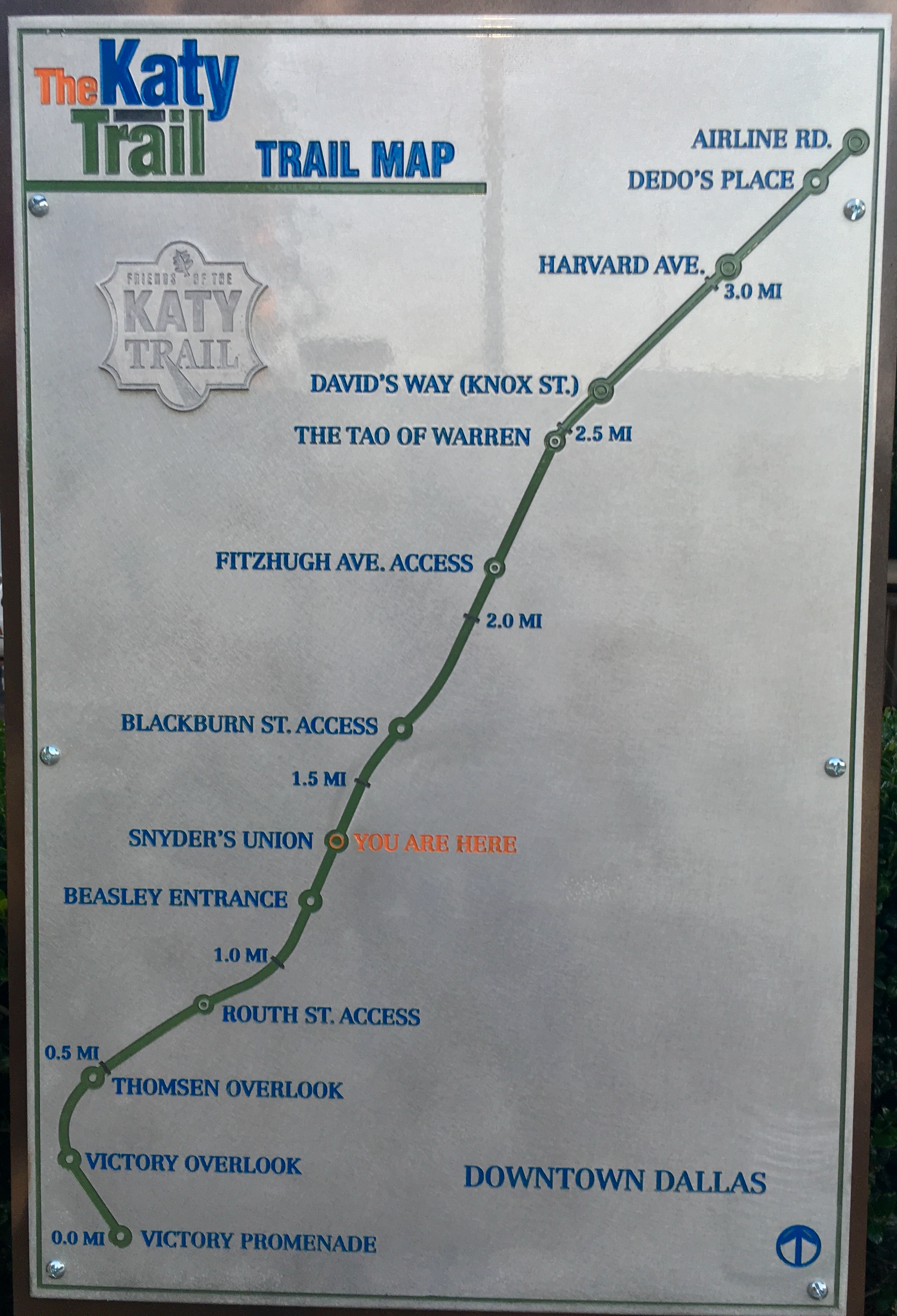
Sign mapping the Katy Trail

The trail consists of a 12-foot-wide (3.7 m) concrete path for pedestrians and cyclists that runs 3.5 miles (5.6 km) from American Airlines Center in Victory Park to Mockingbird Station (a DART light rail station) near Southern Methodist University. A soft, recycled rubber track, used for running, parallels the concrete path.

This adaptive re-use of unused railroad tracks unifies several Dallas districts and provides a major recreational amenity for the more than 300,000 people who live and work within a mile of the trail (The southernmost Trail-head is 0.5 miles (800 m) from downtown Dallas at the American Airlines Center). This new, partly completed linear greenway is already popular among pedestrians and nature-lovers, both Dallas residents and visitors.

The Katy Trail is also directly responsible for an upsurge in property values and retail-restaurant sales in adjacent neighborhoods and developments. On April 21, 2006, The Dallas Morning News called Katy Trail "one of our city’s favorite outdoor spaces". Katy Trail has become such a popular jogging location that some Dallas citizens quip, "The trains don’t run here anymore...Dallas does."

== History ==
The trail's life began when the Union Pacific Railroad, which had bought the Katy, donated the abandoned lines to the city in 1993. The train tracks that are now the location of the Katy Trail, formed the major eastbound route through Dallas of the former Missouri-Kansas-Texas (MKT or "Katy") Railroad, which shut down this segment of its network in the late 1980s. The stations, which had served Dallas residents on their trips east for so many years, were torn down, but the tracks remained.

In the early 1980s, The Katy was initially considered for DART's Red and Blue lines to the Northeast, but the current route beneath Central Expressway was chosen instead.

By the early 1990s, Dallas residents, businesspeople, and city and county officials proposed restoring the greenbelt along the railroad route and creating an urban park as part of the national Rails-to-Trails Conservancy program, established in 1986 and based in Washington, D.C.

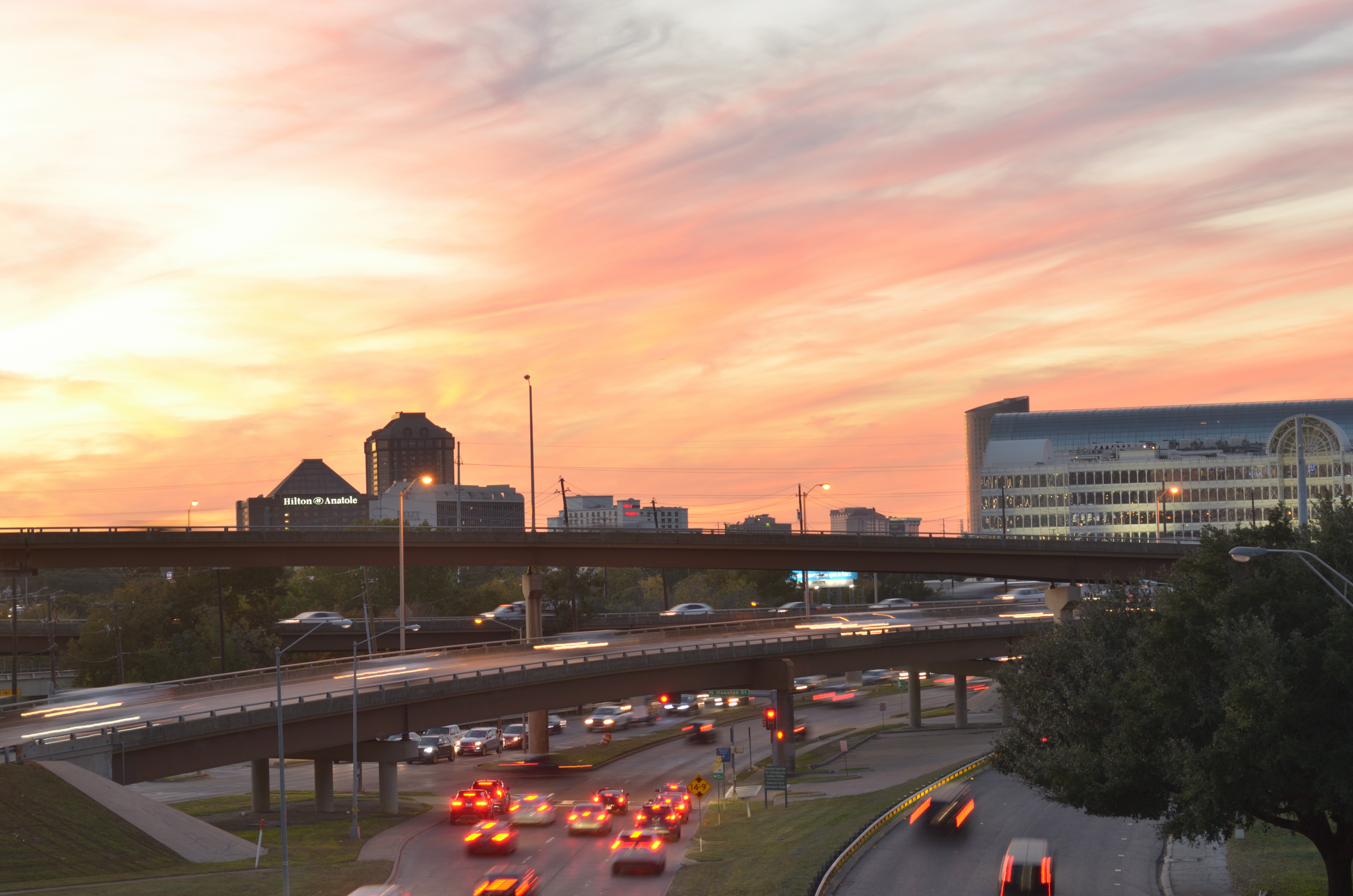
Looking down at Harry Hines Boulevard from a Katy Trail pedestrian bridge

Looking down at Cedar Springs Road from a Katy Trail pedestrian bridge

Since Friends of the Katy Trail was formed in 1997, this trail has become a civic point of pride in Dallas. The trail, though a public park, is privately maintained. Each year, Friends of the Katy Trail runs an Annual Support Campaign to solicit donations for the trail. In 2007, the capital campaign (which raised funds for both ongoing trail maintenance and trail expansion) netted a high of more than $2 million, while in other years it has fluctuated closer to $1 million. Although private donations are a major source of support for trail maintenance, they are complemented by government and foundation grants.

The Katy Trail is intended to provide an effective way of connecting the various Dallas city parks running from White Rock Lake to the Trinity River Project park system along the Trinity River. The rail trail runs alongside Reverchon Park and the parks system along Turtle Creek, a tributary of the Trinity River.

== Master plan ==
Originally, the Dallas Park & Recreation Department planned a basic concrete pathway system along the railroad right of way. The Friends of the Katy Trail have greatly expanded that vision by hiring The SWA Group, an international landscape architecture, planning, and urban design firm, to create a $23 million master plan for two trails and an urban park connecting the West End district to Mockingbird Station.

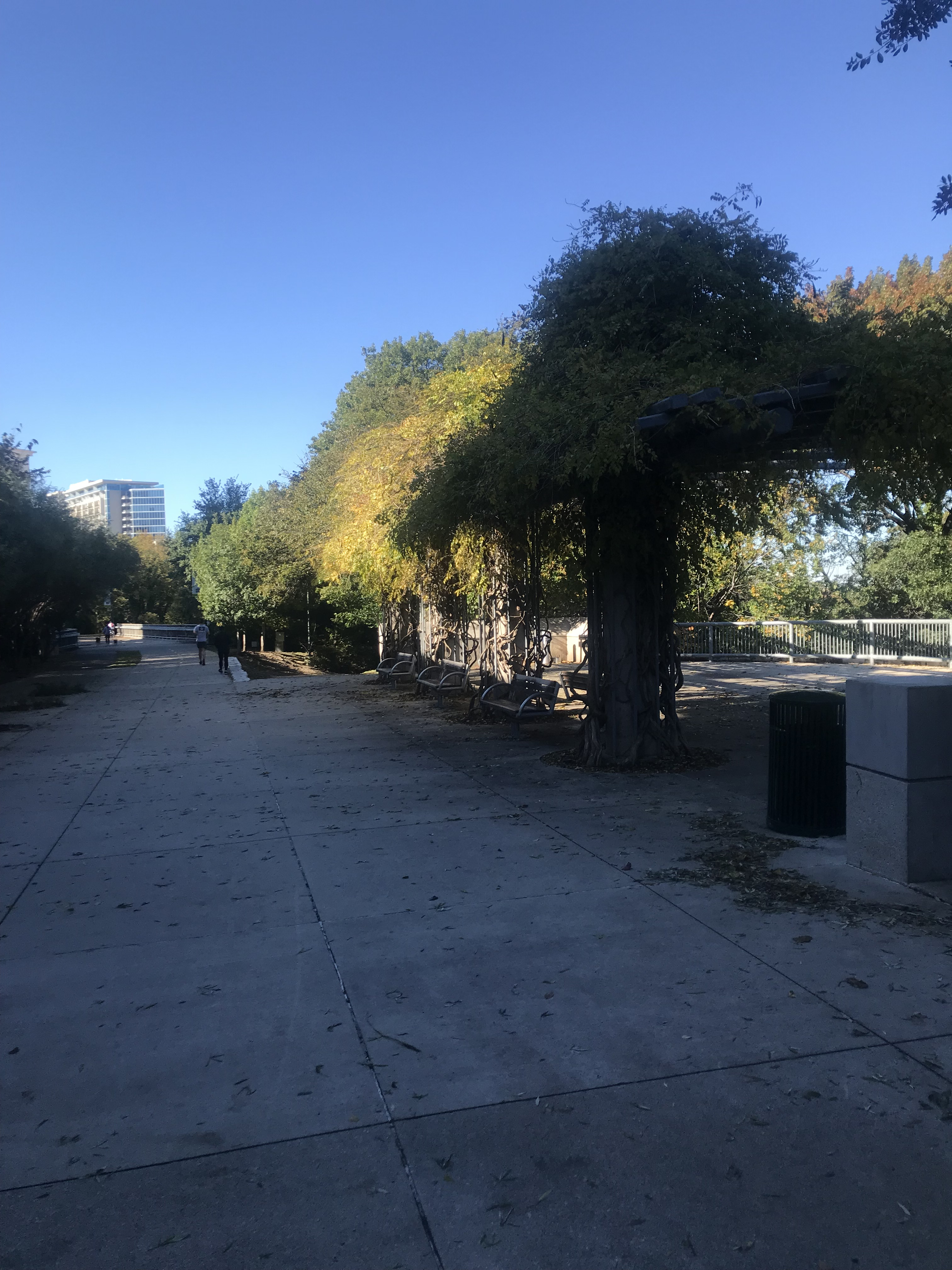
View from Katy Trail where it borders Reverchon Park in Dallas

Katy Trail is aspiring to have a 3.5-mile-long (5.6 km), 12-foot-wide (3.7 m) concrete path for bicyclists and in-line skaters, an adjacent 3.1-mile-long (5.0 km), 8-foot-wide (2.4 m) soft-surface track for pedestrians, four major entrance plazas, ADA-compliant entrances, benches, landscaping, and drinking fountains for all users, including pets. It will be connected to the Trinity Strand Trail.

The planting plan is dominated by native Texas trees and plants, including chinkapin and Lacey oaks, perennial grasses, Flame Acanthus, and numerous species of native salvias and other plans which support water conservation.

For years, the abandoned railroad tracks have been left in a state of disrepair, but the master plan includes strategies to transform negative public perceptions of the Katy Trail through landscaping, lighting, and in particular, the design of nine public spaces at important crossings and intersections. For night-time safety without adding light pollution, reflective shield lamps atop 25-foot (7.6 m) poles direct light onto the trail. The public spaces also have more intimate lighting and distinctive light fixtures.
