= Oak Lawn, Dallas =

Oak Lawn
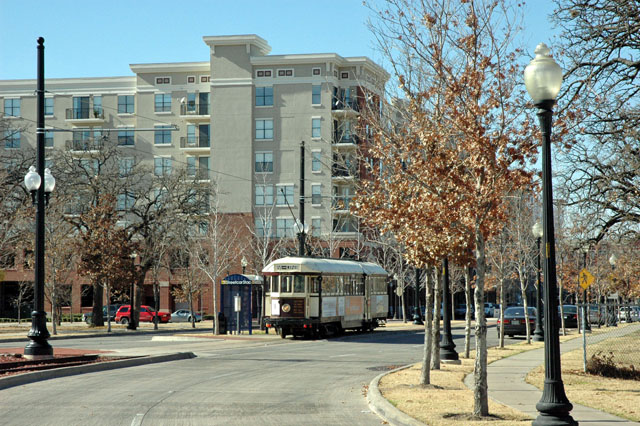
- Nickname: Gayborhood
- Location in Dallas Official Unofficial
- Country: United States
- State: Texas
- Counties: Dallas
- City: Dallas

Area
  - Total: 12 sq mi (31 km^{2})
- Elevation: 479 ft (146 m)

Population (2014)
  - Total: 50,805
- Population total includes combined population of Oak Lawn and Uptown
- ZIP codes: 75201, 75204, 75205, 75219, 75235 (small area)
- Area codes: 214, 469, 972, 945
- Website: http://www.oaklawncommittee.org/

Oak Lawn is a neighborhood in Dallas, Texas (United States), defined in Dallas City Ordinance 21859 as Planned Development District No. 193, the Oak Lawn Special Purpose District. The unofficial boundaries are Turtle Creek Boulevard, Central Expressway, the City of Highland Park, Inwood Road, and Harry Hines Boulevard. It is over 12 square miles (31 km^{2}) in area. Officially it is bounded by the City of Highland Park, the North Central Expressway, Stemmons Freeway, Woodall Rodgers Freeway, and other roads. The district is within the boundary defined by the City of Dallas law, excluding any existing planned development districts within.

== About ==
Oak Lawn is one area of metropolitan Dallas. The area is peppered with upscale buildings. Along the Uptown portion on McKinney Avenue and along Turtle Creek Boulevard, there are many new high-rise condominiums and apartments. It is also a very mixed neighborhood with well-established areas of older, single-family homes.

For most of the 20th century the southern portion of the neighborhood near the intersection of Cedar Springs Road and Harry Hines Blvd was known as "Little Mexico". St. Anne's Catholic school served as the center for the community. With the redevelopment of the neighborhood beginning in the 1980s Little Mexico vanished. Only a few structures of this original community remain for most have been replaced by high rise office buildings, luxury hotels, and condominiums. As of 2010, St Ann's Catholic School, which had closed, is now an upscale restaurant.

Oak Lawn became a magnet for the counterculture movement in the late 1960s due to its inexpensive apartments and its proximity to Turtle Creek Park (formerly known as Lee Park and Oak Lawn Park). The Station 4 nightclub can be found on Cedar Springs Road.

== Geography ==
=== Neighborhoods ===
- International Center
- Love Field neighborhood
- Turtle Creek
- Maple, Dallas
- Perry Heights

== Government and infrastructure ==
The United States Postal Service operates the Oak Lawn Post Office at 2825 Oak Lawn Avenue; ZIP Code: 75219.

The Federal Bureau of Prisons South Central Region Office was previously in Oak Lawn. It has since moved to the U.S. Armed Forces Reserve Complex in Grand Prairie, Texas.

== Diplomatic missions ==
The Consulate-General of the United Kingdom in Dallas was located in Suite 940 at 2911 Turtle Creek Boulevard.

In April 2005 the British government announced that it was closing the Dallas consulate in the summer of 2005; its territory was transferred to the consulate-general in Houston. It was one of 19 British diplomatic missions shut down around that time period. The Foreign and Commonwealth Office of the United Kingdom said that the consulates and embassies closed as a way to decrease costs.

The Consulate-General of Mexico in Dallas is also located in Oak Lawn. Alfredo Corchado of The Dallas Morning News said that as of 2009, in terms of activity and size of the area Mexican population, the Dallas consulate is considered to be the third most important Mexican consulate after Los Angeles and Chicago.

The consulate moved from 8855 North Stemmons Freeway to 1210 River Bend Drive in January 2009.

== Education ==
=== Public schools ===
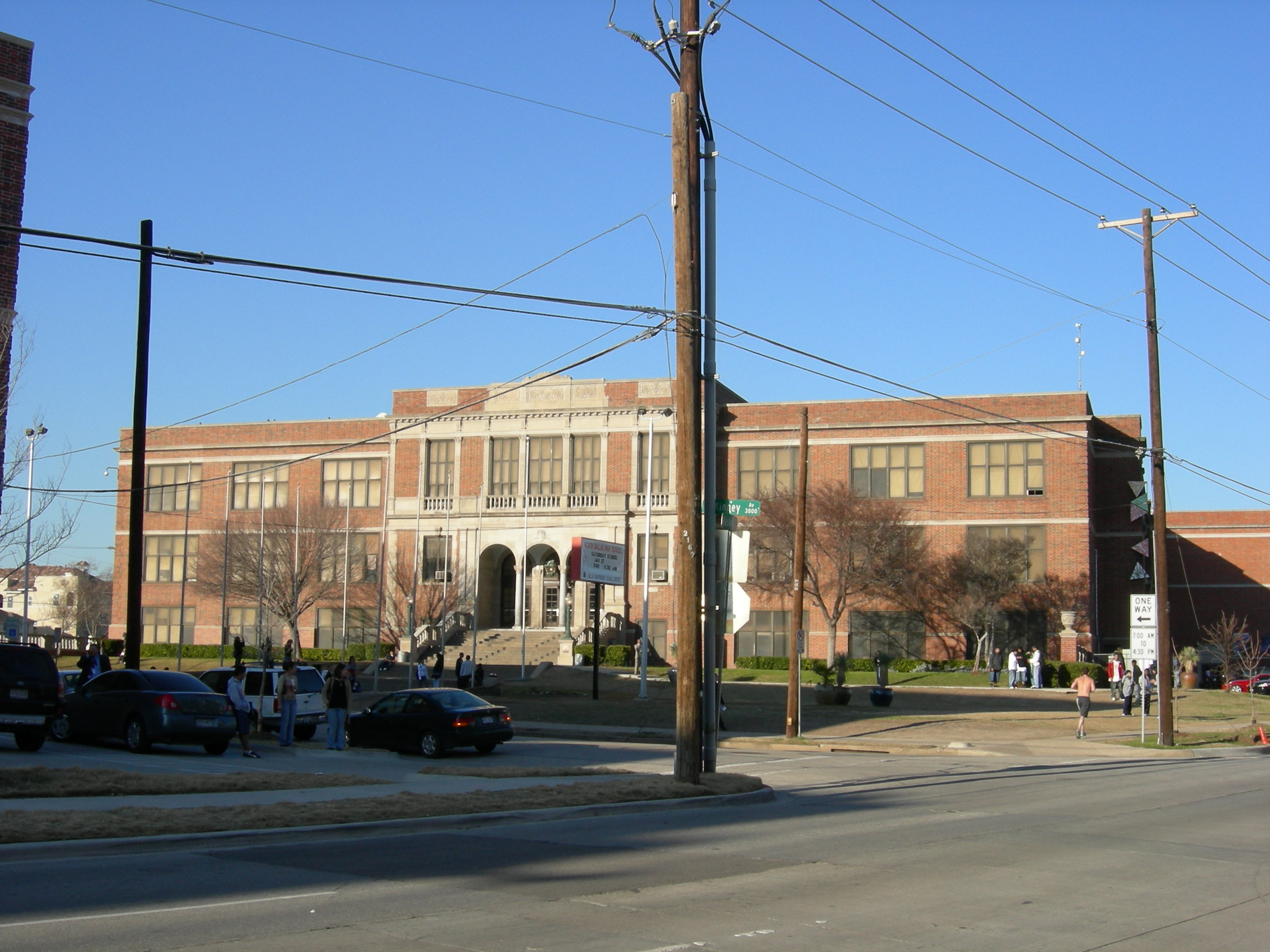
North Dallas High School

The public schools in Oak Lawn are part of the Dallas Independent School District and are zoned among the following:

- Ben Milam Elementary School
- Esperanza "Hope" Medrano Elementary School
- Maple Lawn Elementary School
- North Dallas High School
- Sam Houston Elementary School (closed June 2025)
- T. J. Rusk Middle School

The William B. Travis Academy/Vanguard for the Academically Talented and Gifted is located near McKinney Avenue and Oak Grove Avenue.

In 2014-2015 its student body was 95% low income; despite that it exceeded its "performance targets". Due to gentrification, Sam Houston's enrollment declined to 201 students in the 2015-2016 school year while it had 302 students in the 2011-2012 school year.

Irma Lerma Rangel Young Women's Leadership School was previously in Oak Lawn.

=== Private schools ===
- Holy Trinity Catholic School, age 3 through 8th grade.
- Dallas Christian Academy, prekindergarten through 12th grade.

The Walt Whitman Community School (WWCS), an LGBT-oriented private school, was established in 1997 in Oak Lawn. It closed in 2004.

=== Public Libraries ===
The Oak Lawn Branch of the Dallas Public Library serves the Oak Lawn area. In addition to its regular library holdings, it has the only circulating, non-reference collection of LGBT materials in the US.

== Infrastructure ==
=== Transportation ===
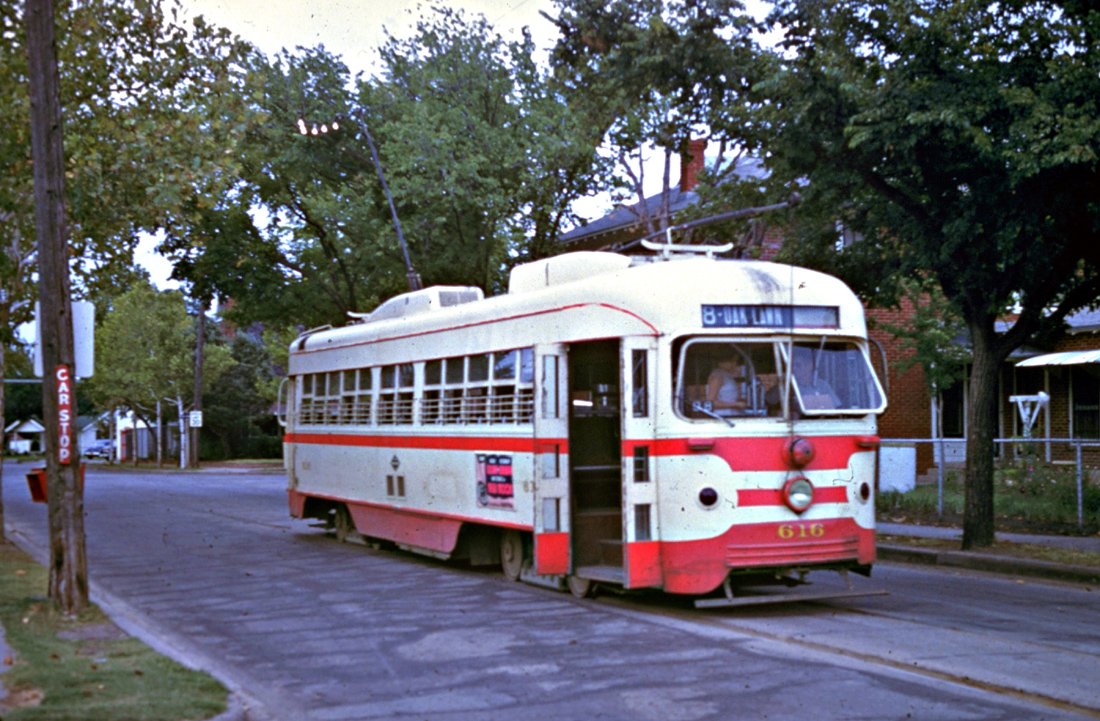
A trolley running along a now-defunct trolleyline in 1948

Central Expressway (US 75) flanks the community on the east. Spur 366, known locally as Woodall Rodgers Freeway, runs along the southern border of the community. The Lomac and Uptown portions of Oak Lawn are served by the free M-Line Trolley, provided by the McKinney Avenue Transit Authority. The Blue and Red light-rail lines stop at Cityplace Station, right outside Oak Lawn. Just outside Oak Lawn to the southwest is Victory Station in Victory Park, which is served by the Trinity Railway Express, both red and blue lines during special events, and regularly by the Green and Orange light rail lines. The two lines continue to the northwest, stopping at Market Center Station and Southwestern Medical District/Parkland Station within Oak Lawn.

- DART: Blue Line and Red Line

== Culture ==
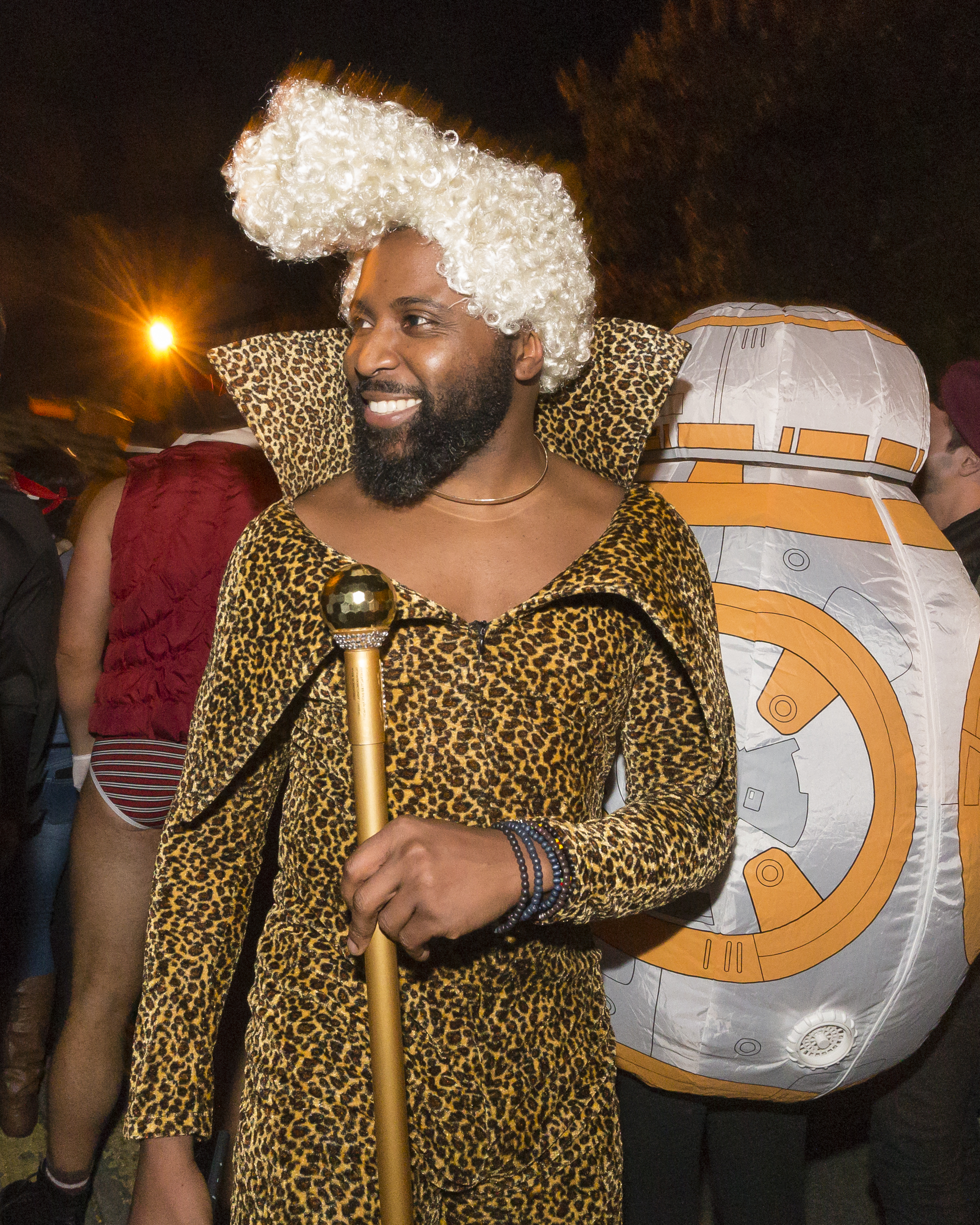
The Oaklawn Halloween Block Party

Oak Lawn is considered to be the epicenter of Dallas–Fort Worth Metroplex's gay and lesbian culture. Cedar Springs Road, between Oak Lawn Avenue and Wycliff Avenue, has numerous businesses, retail establishments, restaurants and night clubs catering to the LGBTQ community. The area has some of Dallas' most renowned gay bars and nightclubs, most of which are located along, or close to, Cedar Springs Road. Oak Lawn is contiguous with the Dallas Design District and less than two miles away from Downtown Dallas.

The area also hosts some of the larger city festivals including the annual Halloween street festival, Dallas' Gay Pride parade, and Easter in the Park at Oak Lawn Park (formerly Robert E. Lee Park).

In 2014, Dallas's Oak Lawn was voted the number one gayborhood by Out Traveler. In October 2018, Dallas made history when it became the first Texas city to get state recognition for its Oak Lawn LGBT neighborhood.

There is a large concentration of Hispanic owned businesses, restaurants, grocery stores, nightclubs, and retail establishments on the Maple Avenue corridor between the Inwood Road and the North Dallas Tollway.

=== Architecture ===
Oak Lawn is one of the older neighborhoods in Dallas. Continuous redevelopment of the neighborhood has created a mixture of architectural styles spanning much of the 20th century to the present day.

Measuring by structural height, the tallest buildings in or adjacent to Oak Lawn are as follows:

1. Cityplace Center, 560 feet (171 m) (42 floors)
2. W Dallas Victory Hotel and Residences, 439 feet (134 m) (32 floors)
3. Azure, 375 feet (114 m) (31 floors)
4. 1900 McKinney (26 floors)
5. Mayfair at Turtle Creek, 302 feet (92 m) (24 floors)
6. 2500 McKinney, 285 feet (87 m) (25 floors)
7. Ritz-Carlton, Dallas, 285 feet (87 m) (21 floors)
8. 17 Seventeen McKinney (22 floors)
9. Residences on McKinney, 231 feet (70 m) (22 floors)
10. La Tour Condominiums (22 floors)
11. McKinney Avenue Lofts (21 floors)
12. The Ashton (20 floors)
13. The Mondrian (20 floors)
14. The Vendome, 252 feet (77 m) (20 floors)

== See also ==
- Gay village
- LGBT rights in Texas
