= Cityplace =

Cityplace may refer to:

in Canada

- CityPlace, Toronto, a condominium development under construction in Downtown Toronto, Ontario
- Cityplace (Winnipeg), an office and retail complex in Winnipeg, Manitoba

in the United Kingdom

- City Place Gatwick, an office development at London Gatwick Airport in Crawley, West Sussex, England

in the United States

- City Place, a mixed-use development in Fort Worth, Texas
- CityPlace (Downtown West Palm Beach), an urbanist lifestyle center in West Palm Beach, Florida
- Cityplace, Dallas, a neighborhood in Oak Lawn, Dallas, Texas
  - Cityplace/Uptown (DART station), formerly Cityplace, an LRT station in Cityplace, Dallas
  - Cityplace Center, or Tower at Cityplace, an office building in Cityplace, Dallas
- CityPlace at Buckhead, a residential complex in Atlanta, Georgia
- CityPlace Burlington, a shopping mall in Burlington, Vermont
- City Place I, a skyscraper in Hartford, Connecticut
- City Place Tower (Oklahoma City), a skyscraper in Oklahoma City, Oklahoma
- Ellsworth Place, formerly City Place Mall, in downtown Silver Spring, Maryland
