= Cityplace, Dallas =

Coordinates: 32.807°N 96.793°W

Cityplace
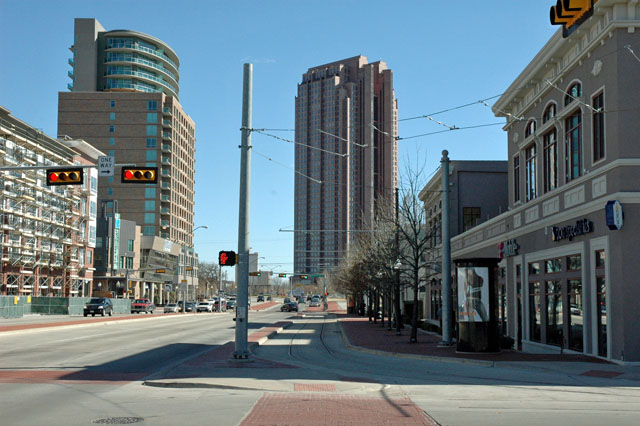
- West Village, Mondrian and Tower at Cityplace
- Interactive map of Cityplace
- Country: United States
- State: Texas
- County: Dallas
- City: Dallas

Area
  - Water: 0 sq mi (0 km^{2}) 0%
- Area codes: 214, 469, 972

Cityplace is a TIF District and neighborhood in Old East Dallas, Dallas, Texas, United States, near the Uptown neighborhood and adjacent to the intersection of Central Expressway and Haskell Avenue/Blackburn Street. East of Central Expressway, the neighborhood includes the tree-lined Haskell Boulevard and travels past the 42-story Cityplace Tower, the tallest building in Dallas outside of Downtown. The west side of Cityplace includes the new-urbanist West Village and the northern end of the Uptown neighborhood.

== Tallest structures ==
Measuring by structural height, the tallest buildings in the Cityplace neighborhood are:

1. Cityplace Tower, 560 feet (171 m)
2. The Mondrian, 263 feet (80 m)

== Economy ==
On June 8, 2009, Dean Foods announced plans to move to the Tower at Cityplace in the first quarter of 2010.

== Attractions ==
- Cityplace Tower
- West Village

== Education ==
=== Public (DISD) ===
==== High schools ====
- North Dallas High School - AAAAA

==== Middle schools ====
- Rusk Middle School
- Alex W. Spence Middle School

==== Elementary schools ====
- Houston Elementary School

==== Private Schools ====
- Holy Trinity Catholic School

== Transportation ==
=== Streetcars ===
- MATA: M-Line Trolley

The M-Line Trolley is a heritage streetcar that provides service between Cityplace/Uptown station in Uptown and St Paul station in Downtown. Service is free.
The M-Line features 40 dedicated stops serving key destinations including: the West Village, McKinney Avenue, Klyde Warren Park, the Dallas Arts District, four historical cemeteries, and the State Thomas historic neighborhood.

=== Light rail ===
- DART: Blue Line, Red Line, and Orange Line
  - Cityplace/Uptown station

== Gallery ==
Tree-lined Haskell Avenue

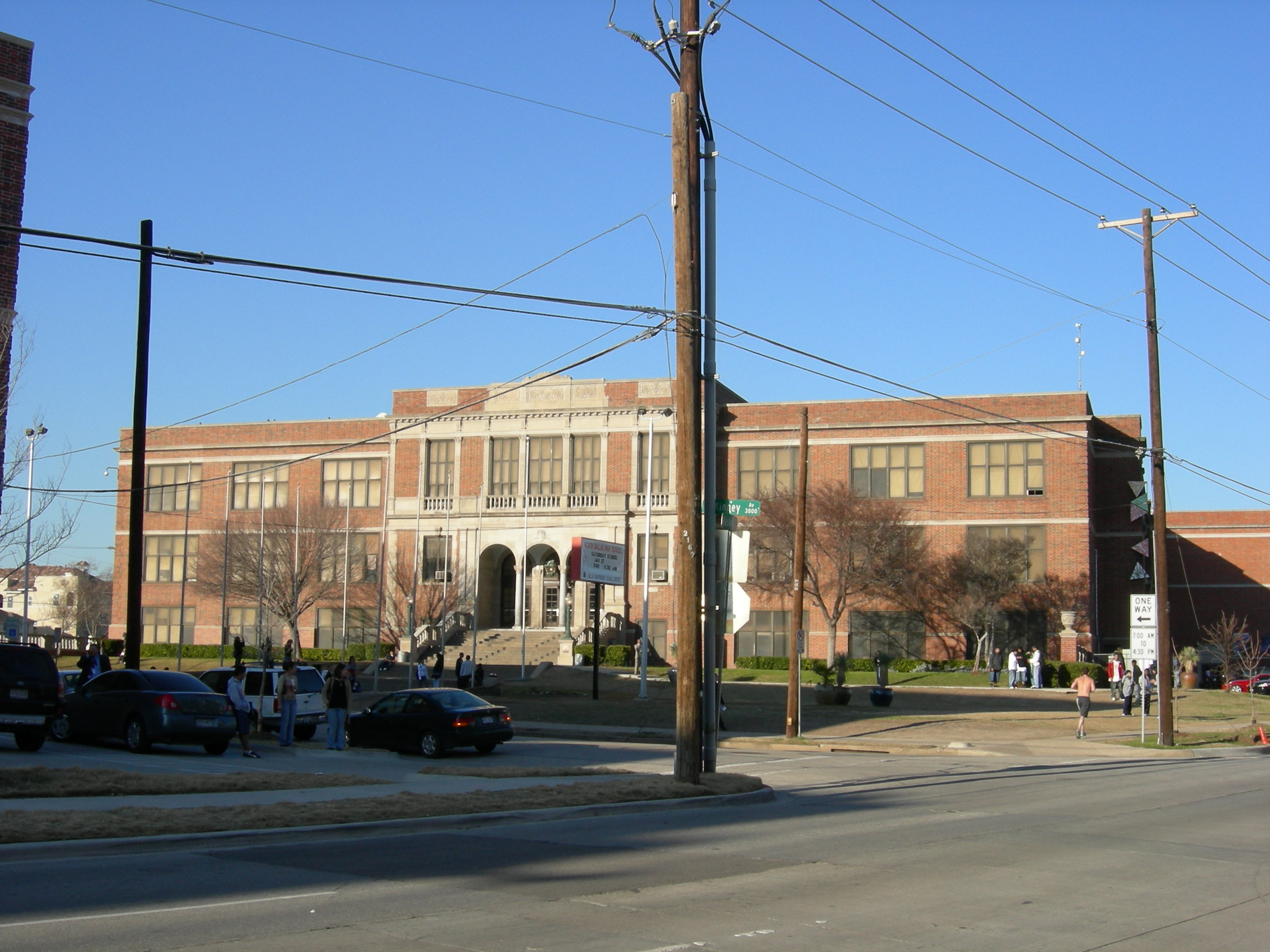
North Dallas High School

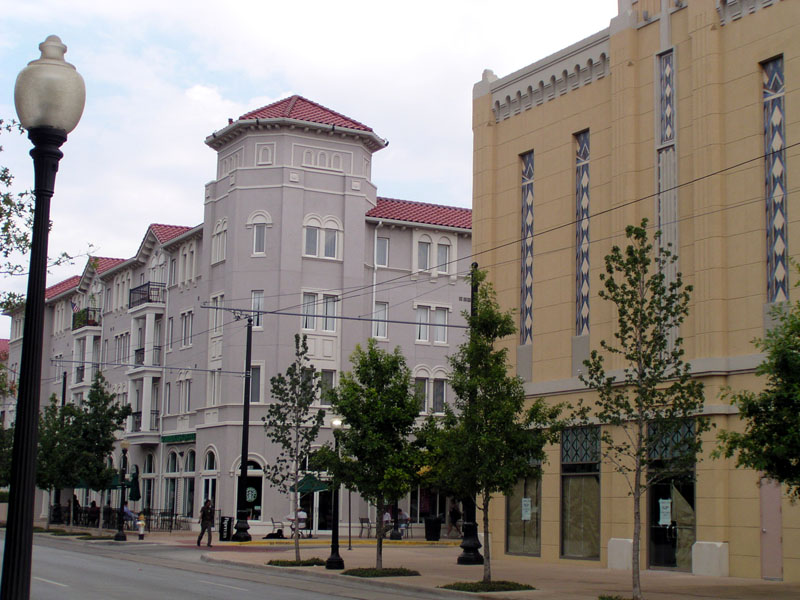
West Village

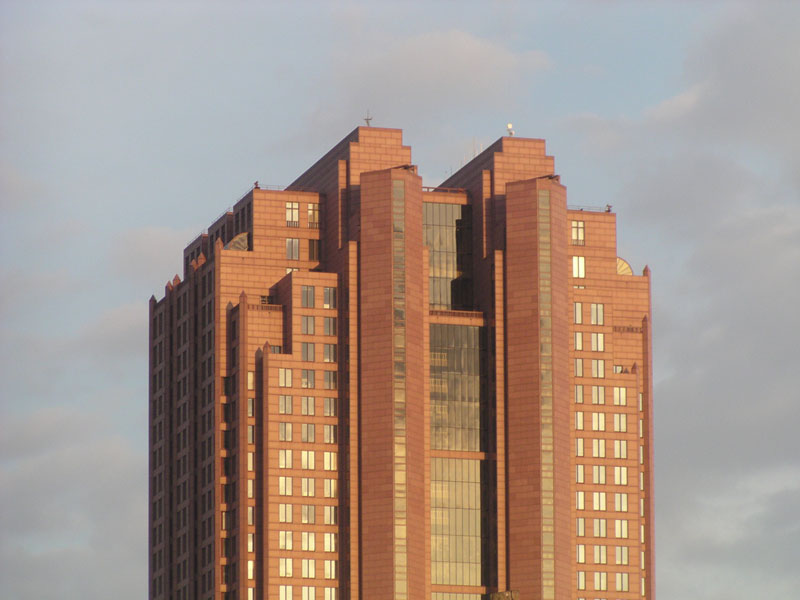
Tower at Cityplace

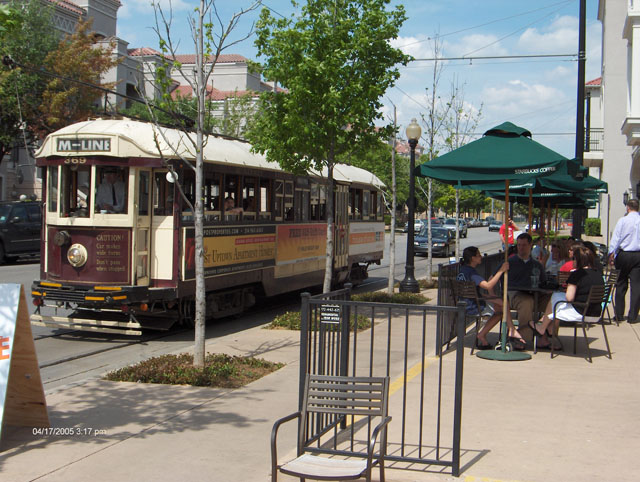
M-Line Trolley at West Village
