= Bryan Place, Dallas =

Neighborhood in Old East Dallas, Texas, USA

Bryan Place
- Neighborhood
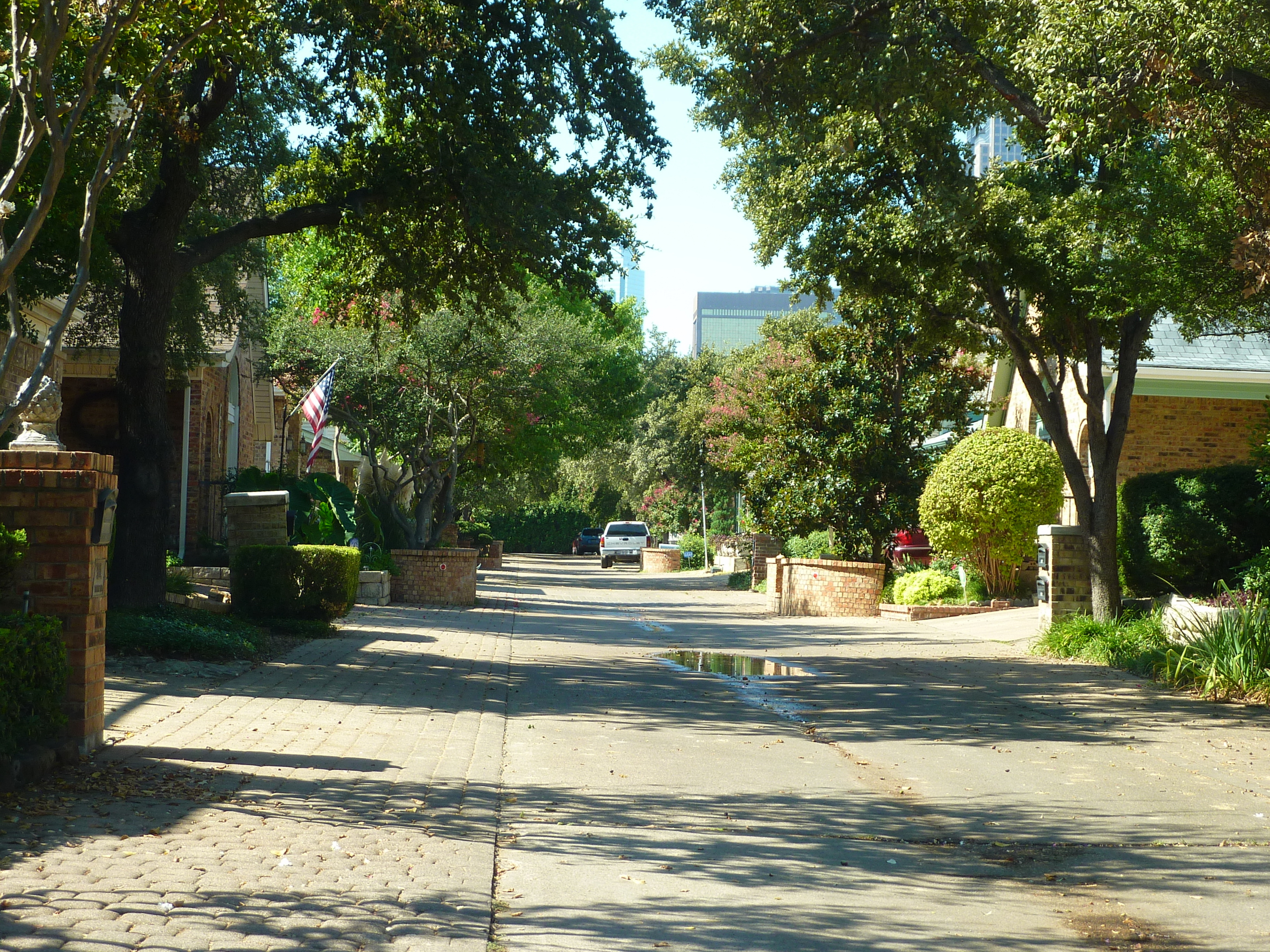
- A residential street in Bryan Place
- Etymology: Named for John Neely Bryan, founder of Dallas
- Location within DFW Location within Texas Location within the United States
- Coordinates: 32.794°N 96.787°W
- Country: United States of America
- State: Texas
- County: Dallas County
- City: Dallas
- Time zone: UTC-6:00 (CST)
  - Summer (DST): UTC-5:00 (CDT)

Bryan Place is a neighborhood in Old East Dallas, Texas (USA). It is east of the Arts District of downtown and the State Thomas neighborhood, north of Deep Ellum, south of Cityplace and west of Munger Place. Its boundaries are generally considered to be US-75 North Central Expressway on the west, Ross Avenue on the (north)west, N. Washington Street on the (north)east, and Live Oak Avenue on the (south)east.

== History ==
Washington Street Townhomes addition, 2001-2003

The neighborhood is named for John Neely Bryan, the founder of Dallas. The current structures in the neighborhood were built in the 1980s by developer Fox and Jacobs.

== Parks ==
The major outdoor community space is Exall Park, located on the south edge of the neighborhood next to Live Oak Street.

== Community facilities ==
The Exall Park Recreation Center is located in Exall Park. The Bryan Place Swimming Pool Association operates a members-only outdoor swimming pool and a meeting room which is available to the community. Adjacent to Bryan Place is the Latino Cultural Center which has an auditorium for larger presentations and meetings.

== Architecture ==
Bryan Place contains an eclectic blend of architecture, old and new, large and small, residential and commercial. Older buildings include commercial buildings and houses from the first half of the 20th century, including the Macedonia Baptist Church and 1935 Dallas ISD Headquarters. Lots sizes are small, with many houses built to "zero lot line" setback on at least one side. Later developments have tended to be multi-family townhouses, low-rise condominiums and apartment buildings since the 1980s, and many single-family homes from the 1980s onwards.

Nearby and visible from much of the neighborhood are Baylor University Medical Center to the south and the former Southwestern Bell tower to the east.

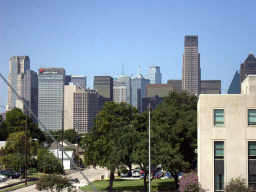
Bryan Place skyline (Downtown Dallas in Background) looking West down San Jacinto Street from N. Haskell Avenue on the eastern edge of Bryan Place

== Transportation ==
=== Highways ===
- North Central Expressway (US 75)

=== Trains ===
- DART Green Line
  - Deep Ellum Station (in adjacent neighborhood: Deep Ellum)
- DART Blue Line and Red Line
  - Cityplace Station (in adjacent neighborhood: Cityplace)

== Education ==
Bryan Place is served by the Dallas Independent School District. Residents of Bryan Place are zoned to J. W. Ray Elementary School, Alex W. Spence Middle School and North Dallas High School. Holy Trinity Catholic School, a private school, located approximately 2 miles northwest of Bryan Place in the Oak Lawn neighborhood, provides education for three-year-olds through eighth grade.
