= Moh Bility =

American football cornerback

No. 10 – Prairie View A&M Panthers
- Position: Cornerback
- Class: Senior

Personal information
- Listed height: 6 ft 0 in (1.83 m)
- Listed weight: 184 lb (83 kg)

Career information
- College: North Texas (2022); Rice (2023-present); Prairie View A&M (2026-present)

Mohammed "Moh" Bility (born 2004) is an American college football cornerback for the Prairie View A&M Panthers. He previously played for the North Texas Mean Green and the Rice Owls.

== Football career ==
Bility began his football career at North Dallas High School, he helped North Dallas reach their first playoff appearance since 1952, and he was the school's first D1 signing in 20 years. Moh first committed to Rice in December 2021.

North Texas Mean Green

Moh redshirted as a true freshman at North Texas, not seeing playing time. He then transferred to Rice in the summer of 2023.

Rice Owls

Moh saw his first playtime, debuting in 2023 in his freshman year on special teams while playing against SMU, Charlotte, FAU and Texas State.

== Reception ==
Bility became notable online, and in the sports world, as his unusual name resembled "mobility". His nickname was coined around tenth grade. He was later featured on sports programs such as Sports Illustrated, ESPN College Gameday, Golf Digest, and Barstool Sports.
