= State Thomas, Dallas =

State Thomas Historic District
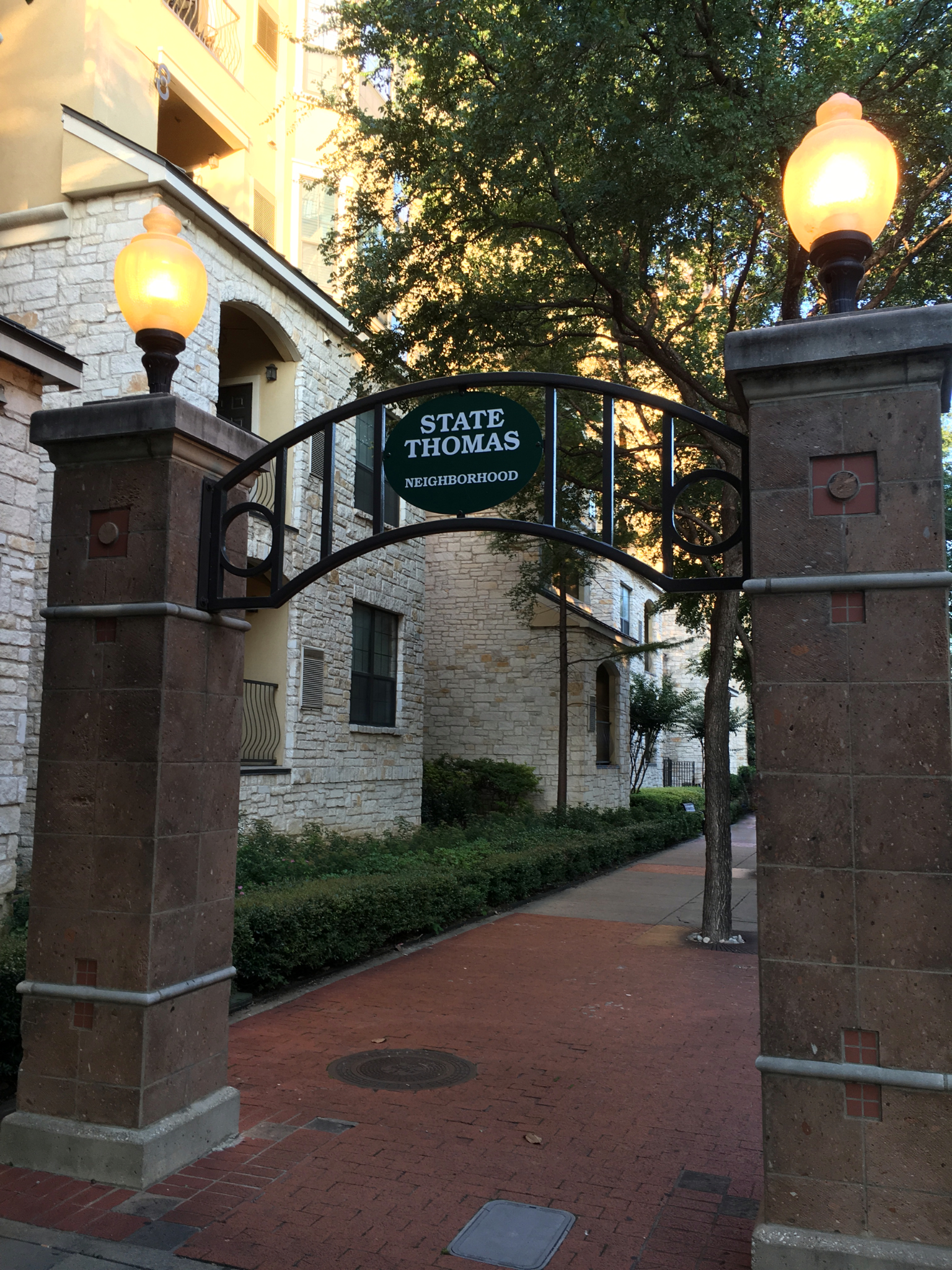

- State Thomas Historic District (the United States)
- 32°47′42″N 96°48′0″W
- Location: Dallas, Texas

Site notes
- Architectural styles: Italianate, Queen Anne and Vernacular styles

Dallas Landmark
- Designated: March 19, 1986
- Reference no.: H/25

State Thomas is a Dallas Landmark District in the Uptown area of Dallas, Texas (USA). It borders downtown to the south at Woodall Rodgers Freeway, Bryan Place to the east at US 75 (Central Expressway), and LoMac to the north and west.

The State Thomas neighborhood contains the largest collection of Victorian-era homes remaining in Dallas including the Jacob and Eliza Spake House listed on the National Register of Historic Places. The establishment of the region as a Special Purpose District in 1986 helped make it one of the first new urbanist regions in the city.

== Griggs Park ==
Griggs Park sits on the northeastern edge of State Thomas, where the neighborhood borders Woodall Rodgers Freeway. The pet-friendly park spans eight acres and features walking paths, benches, groves of trees, and views of both the downtown and uptown Dallas skylines. The park also features a memorial to the park's namesake, the Rev. A.R. Griggs, a 19th-century Baptist preacher and leader in the historic State Thomas and Freedman's community.

== Transportation ==
=== Streetcars ===
- MATA: M-Line Trolley

The M-Line Trolley is a heritage streetcar that provides service between Cityplace/Uptown station in Uptown and St Paul station in Downtown. Service is free.
The M-Line features 40 dedicated stops serving key destinations including: the West Village, McKinney Avenue, Klyde Warren Park, the Dallas Arts District, four historical cemeteries, and the State Thomas historic neighborhood.

=== Highways ===
- Spur 366 (Woodall Rodgers Freeway)
- US 75 Central Expressway

== Gallery ==
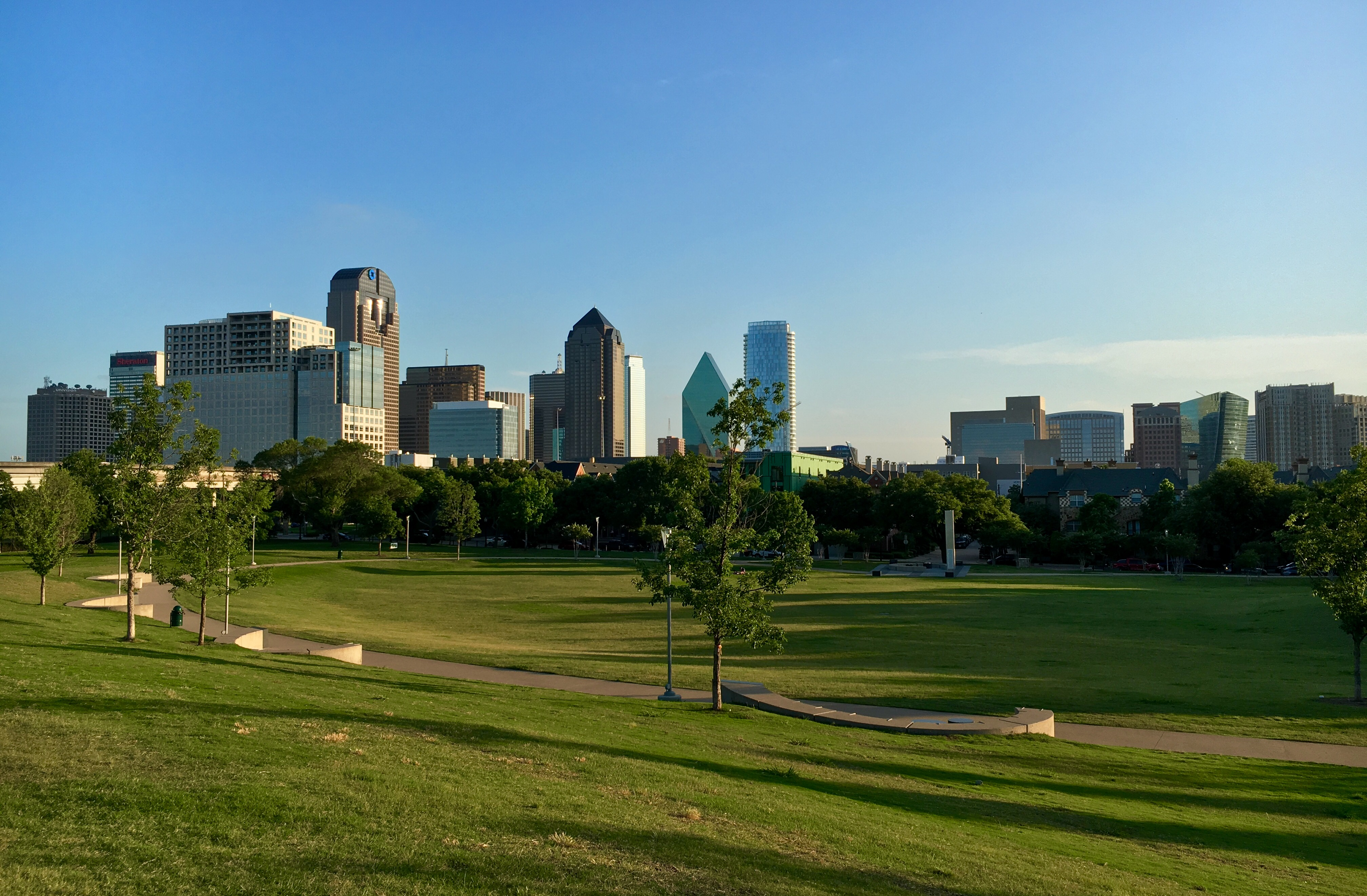
Downtown Dallas skyline as viewed from Griggs Park

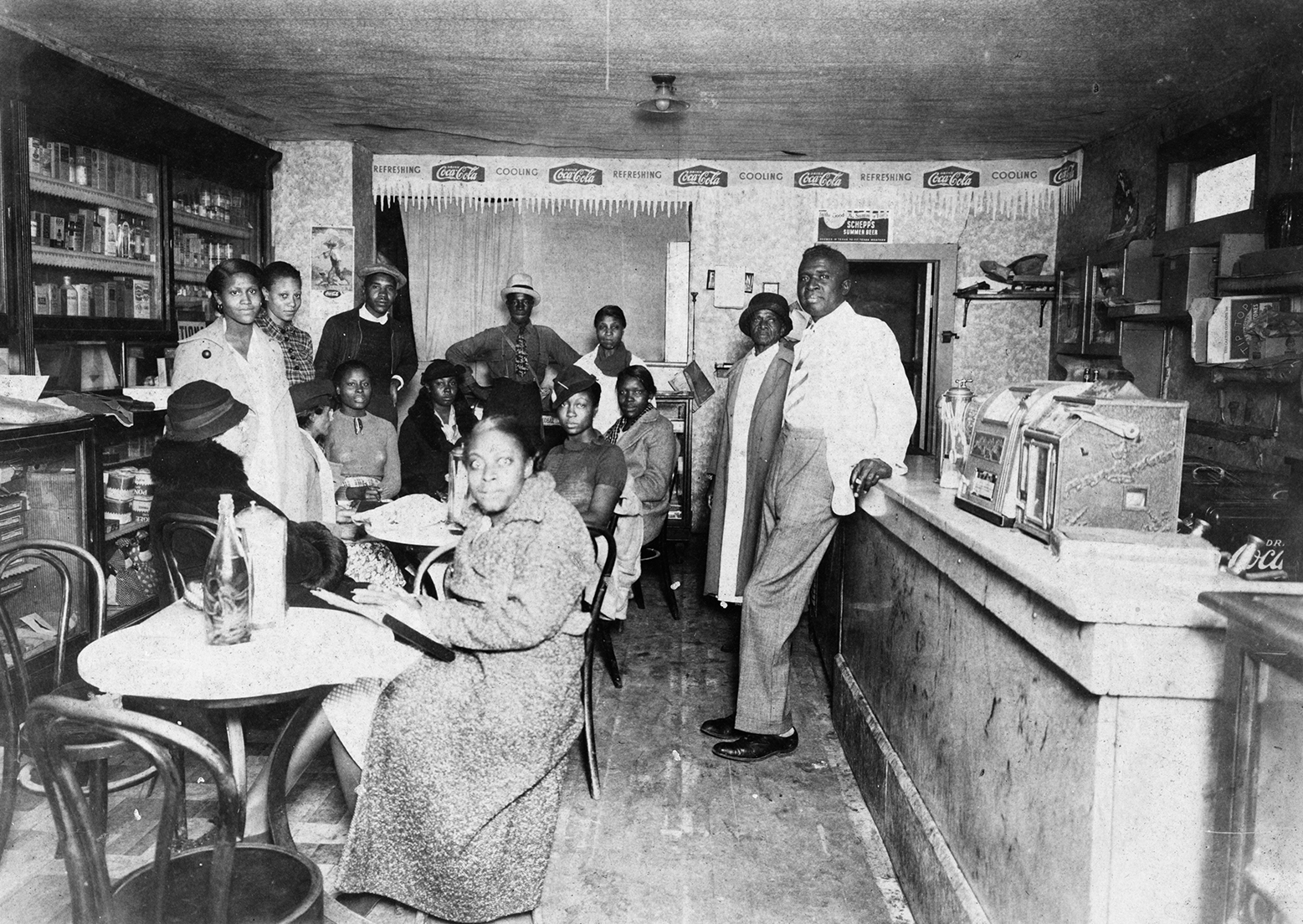
Smith Drug Store in State Thomas, undated
