= The Mondrian =

Highrise building in Dallas, Texas, US

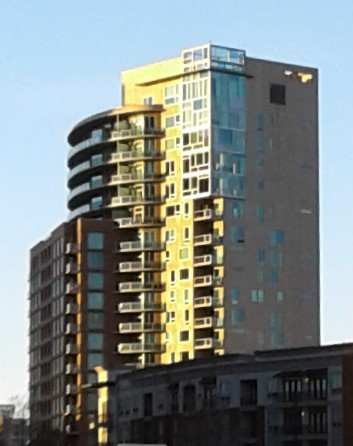
- Interactive map of the The Mondrian area

General information
- Type: residential, retail
- Location: Dallas, Texas, USA
- Coordinates: 32.8083301°N 96.7946552°W
- Construction started: July 2003
- Completed: 2005
- Opening: April 2005

Technical details
- Floor count: 20

Design and construction
- Architect: RTKL
- Developer: ZOM
- Main contractor: Tribble & Stephens

The Mondrian, designed by famed Dallas architect Thomas Brink, is a 20-story high-rise located at 3000 Blackburn Street in the Cityplace neighborhood of Oak Lawn, Dallas, Texas, United States. Construction started on the structure in 2003 and the building was completed in 2005,

The building is located at the corner of McKinney Avenue and Blackburn Street. A central high-rise tower 20 stories high containing 146 dwelling units anchors the structure's postmodern architectural theme. The tower is flanked by 72 two-story urban loft units.

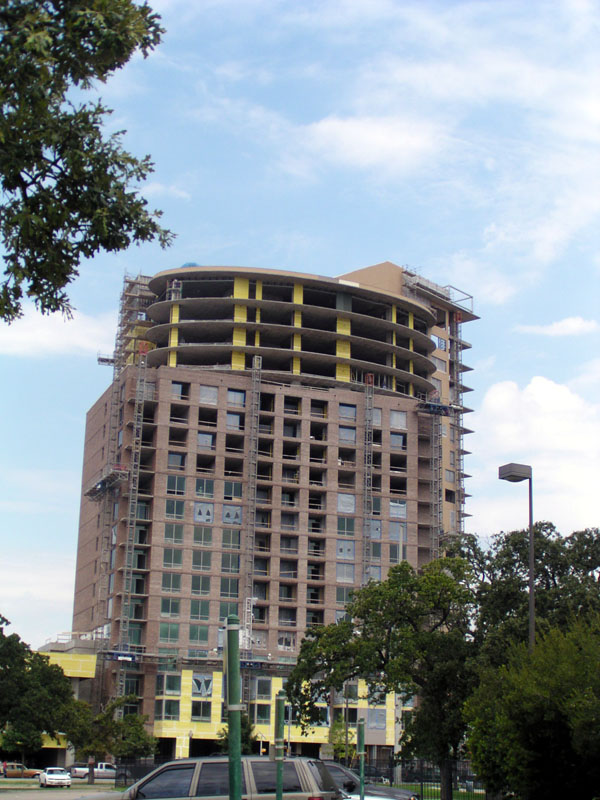
The Mondrian during its construction phase.

At street level, approximately 20,000 square feet (1,900 m^{2}) of retail shops are incorporated into the Mondrian project. Pedestrian access to the retail areas is provided via upgraded perimeter sidewalks in addition to ground level parking within the building for retail customers. Residents have access to a secured multilevel parking deck and a garden pool amenity area.

== See also ==
- List of tallest buildings in Dallas
