= Cityplace Tower (Dallas) =

Office building in Dallas, Texas

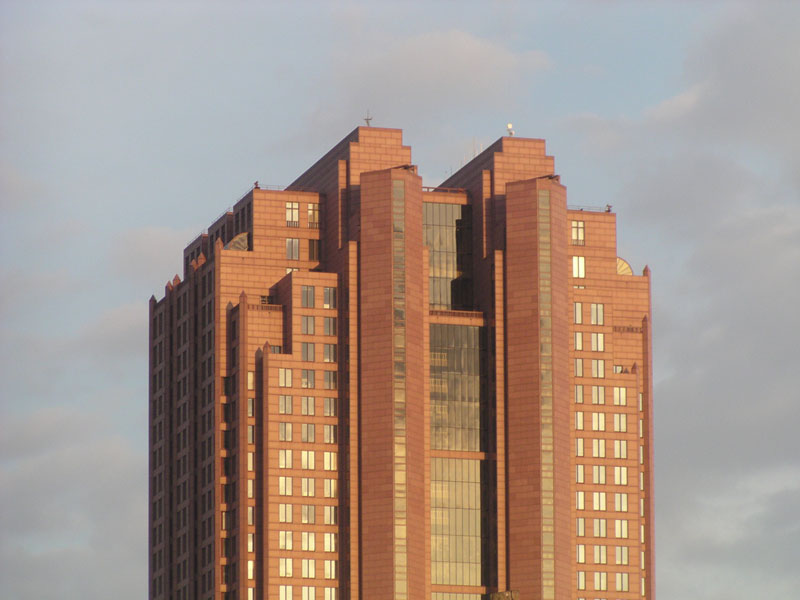
- Interactive map of the Cityplace Tower area

General information
- Type: Office
- Location: 2711 North Haskell Avenue, Dallas, Texas
- Coordinates: 32.805513°N 96.792482°W
- Construction started: December 1984
- Completed: 1988
- Owner: NexPoint Diversified Real Estate Trust

Height
- Roof: 560 feet (171 m)

Technical details
- Floor count: 42
- Floor area: 1,400,000 square feet (130,000 m^{2})

Design and construction
- Architects: Cossutta & Associates
- Developer: Southland Corporation
- Main contractor: HCB Contractors

Other information
- Public transit: DART Rail: at Cityplace/Uptown; DART Bus; M-Line Trolley

The Cityplace Tower (also previously known as the Tower at Cityplace) is a 42-story building located at 2711 North Haskell Avenue, at North Central Expressway (US 75), in the Cityplace district of Uptown Dallas, Texas (USA). The building is 560 feet (171 m) tall and has 1,400,000 square feet (130,000 m^{2}) of office space. It is also the tallest building in Dallas outside of Downtown.

== History ==
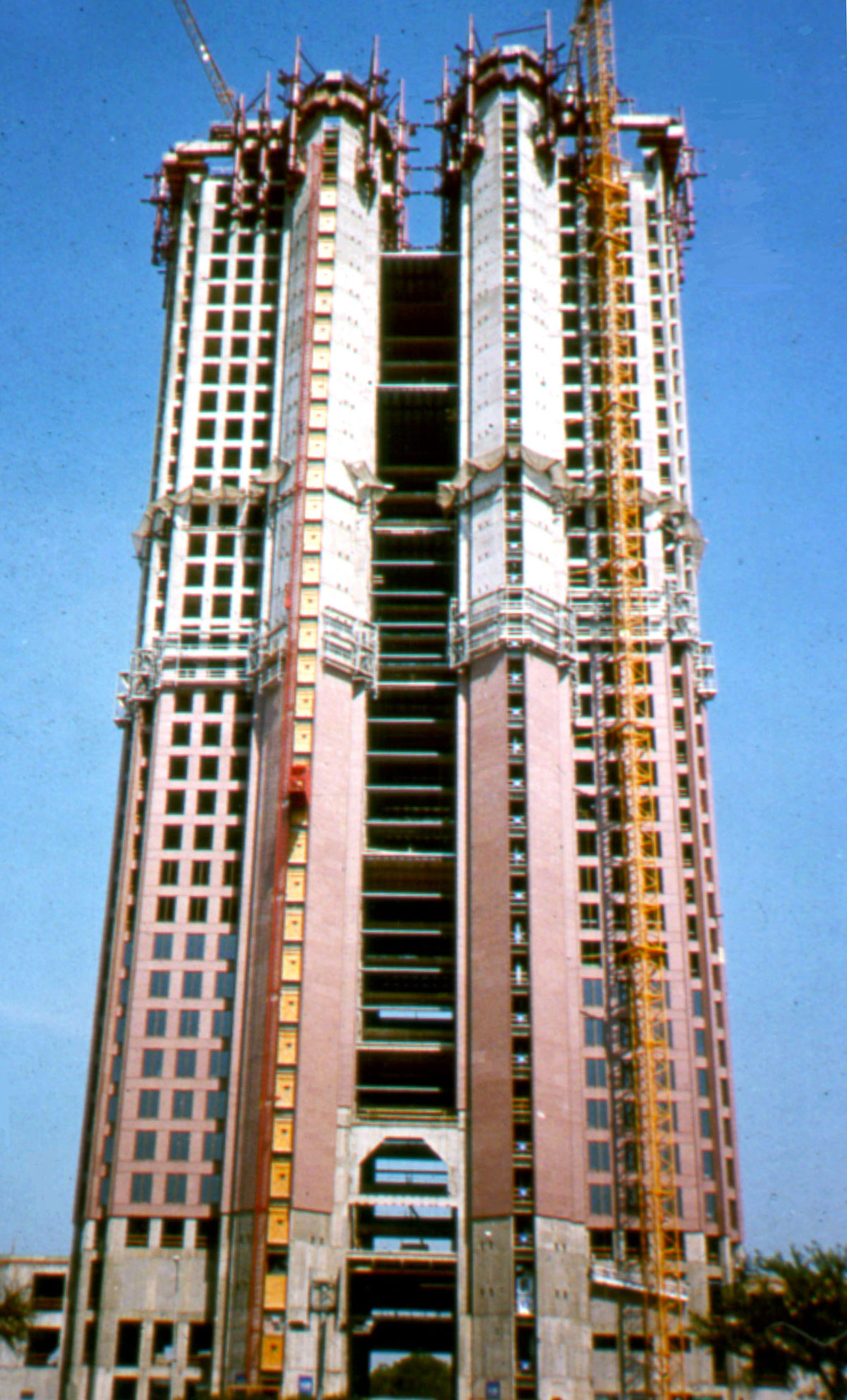
The tower during construction in 1988

The building was designed by Cossutta & Associates (Araldo Cossutta, principal) of New York to be the corporate headquarters for Southland Corporation (now 7-Eleven). Formerly named CityPlace East, it was conceived as the first phase of the 135-acre (55 ha) Cityplace development. A twin tower (CityPlace West), later canceled, was planned across North Central Expressway with a skybridge connection over the highway. Several mid-rise buildings were also planned around the base of both towers. Construction began in December 1984, and the tower opened in 1988 after one year of delays. During this time and as a result of Southland's buyout in 1987, the need for headquarters space was reduced by 50%, leaving the lower 19 floors vacant. Because of the building's unique floorplate (Design), converting the space to speculative office space was a challenge. Despite opening during the Savings and Loan crisis and resulting real estate crash in Dallas, the building was eventually filled. Cityplace East was renamed Cityplace Tower and was the last major skyscraper built in Dallas during the 1980s.

Although neighborhood blocks were demolished in the mid-80's to make way for future phases of Cityplace, additional plans were put on hold. In 1989, Southland sold land on the west side of North Central Expressway (including the CityPlace West site). Today, this area is home to the West Village development. Enough Brazilian red granite was ordered and cut for the twin tower and office buildings; it remains for sale in a south Dallas County storage yard.

In 2000, DART's Cityplace Station, after years of planning, opened beneath North Central Expressway with entrances on both sides of the highway, the east side being at the bottom of the tower, the west in an aluminum and glass hut above the elevator shaft to the station's upper level under the expressway.

7-Eleven moved to One Arts Plaza in 2007, leaving half of the building vacant. Ashkenazy & Agus Ventures bought the property for $125 million and spent $7 million on upgrades. There were plans to turn the top of the tower into luxury apartments, but an influx of new office tenants changed this plan. The building was renamed Tower at Cityplace. In 2008, UCR Urban proposed new retail development on the ground sites previously reserved for mid rise office towers.

== Design ==
Costing almost $300 million for construction and improvements, the 42-story Cityplace skyscraper was the most expensive office project ever built in Dallas.

Constructed as an elaborate corporate headquarters, the lower floors were devoted to facilities not commonly found in multitenant buildings. The ground floor contains a 38,000-square-foot (3,500 m^{2}) conference center with a 175-seat auditorium, a large cafeteria and a fitness center.

There are seven 5-story atrium lobbies spaced throughout the tower with glass windows at each end. This unique design provides clear views of downtown and East Dallas, but limits floor space on each level. The second and third floors, along with a basement-level concourse, were built with space for retail tenants. Below the tower is a 3,400-car underground parking garage, one of the largest in the region.

The façade of the building is made of Brazilian red granite, and the first four floors are finished in pink and white marble, imported wood paneling, and decorative tile. Elevators are lined with brass, polished wood, and stone, and cut mirrors.

== Tenants ==
- Dean Foods
- Lone Star Funds

== Onsite businesses ==
Subway and Larry North Fitness are no longer businesses in Cityplace.

== See also ==
- List of buildings and structures in Dallas, Texas
