= North Dallas High School =

High school in Dallas, Texas, United States

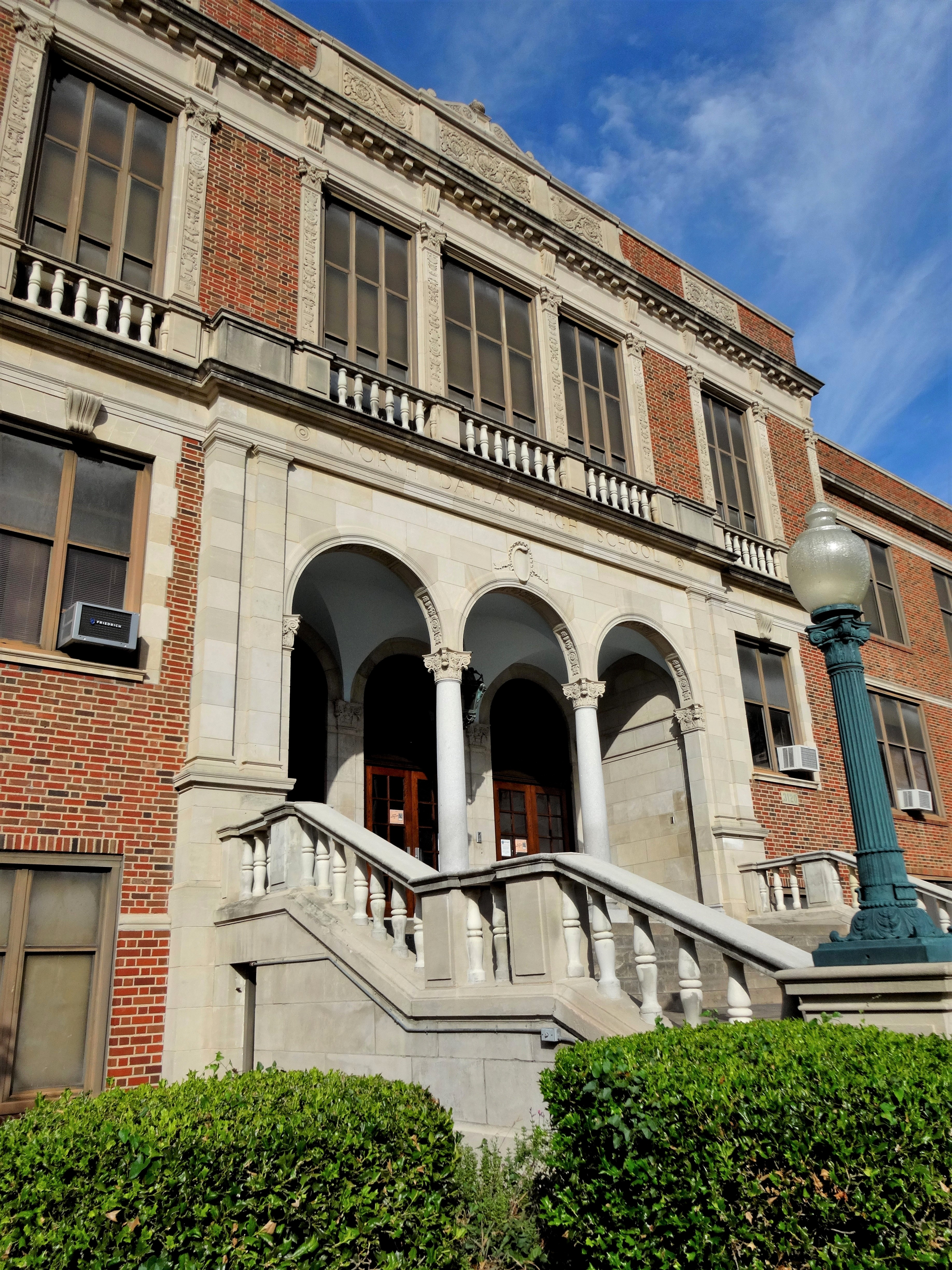

Location
- 3120 North Haskell Avenue; Dallas, Texas 75204; United States; 32.810525°N 96.794828°W

Information
- Type: Public, secondary
- Motto: To graduate well educated students who are independent learners, creative problem solvers, and productive citizens.
- School district: Dallas Independent School District
- Principal: Gerardo Hernández
- Faculty: 108
- Teaching staff: 83.41 (FTE)
- Grades: 9-12
- Enrollment: 1,276 (2023-2024)
- Student to teacher ratio: 15.30
- Colors: Orange and white
- Mascot: Bulldog
- Trustee dist.: 2, Dustin Marshall
- Area: 3, Emilio Castro
- Website: www.dallasisd.org/northdallas

North Dallas High School is a public secondary school located in the Oak Lawn area of Dallas, Texas, United States. It enrolls students in grades 9-12 and is a part of the Dallas Independent School District. As of 2017, the principal administrator is Katherine Eska.

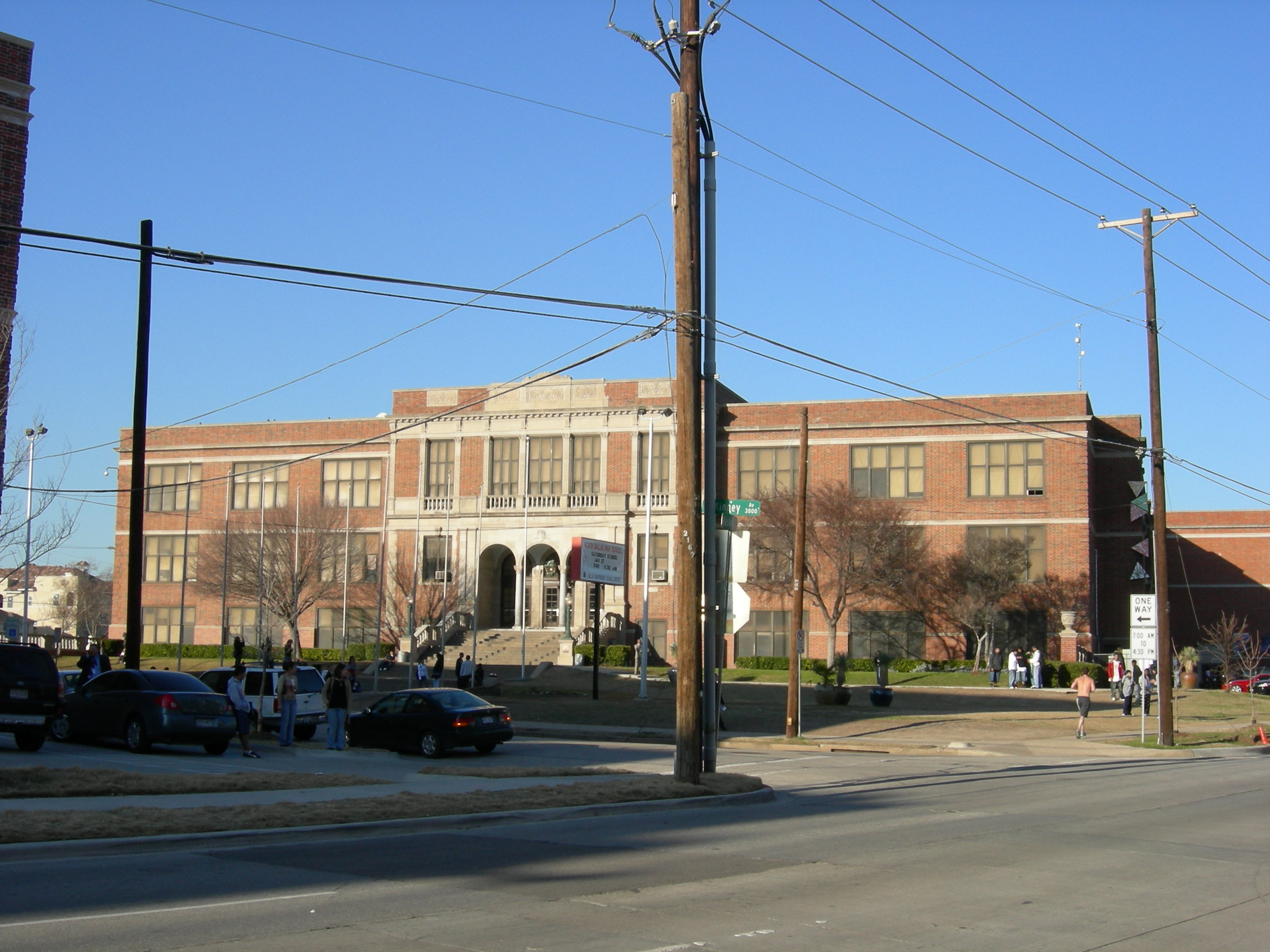

In 2015, the school was rated "Met Standard" by the Texas Education Agency. In 2017, the school earned state distinctions in the areas of Math and Closing Achievement Gaps.

== History ==
Built in 1922, North Dallas High School is one of the oldest standing high school buildings in the city of Dallas; Booker T. Washington High School was established in 1902 as the Dallas Colored High School, but its current building was constructed well afterward. By 1925, the school had developed sufficient community loyalty that a district decision to rename the school Clinton P. Russell High School in honor of the district's superintendent after his death met with opposition from numerous locals, predominately mothers, who physically blocked the ladders of workmen attempting to make the change, leading the district to rescind its decision the following week (a new elementary school would instead hold Russell's name).

In the early 1990s the school's size placed it in the 5A sports division, until late 2000, when it dropped to 4A.

== Demographics ==
As of 2015 most of the students were racial and ethnic minorities (races other than non-Hispanic white) and about 10% were classified as homeless.

== Neighborhoods served by North Dallas ==
The school itself, in a mixed-income area, serves most of the Oak Lawn area, Maple Lawn, Uptown, Victory Park, Perry Heights, Turtle Creek, Cedar Springs, Bryan Place, Regent's Park on Gillespie Street, and Cityplace. The school also serves downtown Dallas, Deep Ellum, Old East Dallas, and the Dallas ISD portion of Highland Park. Small sections of Munger Place and Swiss Avenue are zoned to North Dallas.

== Feeder patterns ==
The following schools feed into North Dallas:

- Elementary schools (preK-5th grade): Arlington Park, Chávez, Hernandez, Sam Houston, Maple Lawn, Medrano, Ben Milam, Ray, Zaragoza, and John F. Kennedy
- Middle schools (6th-8th grade): Rusk and Spence

== Campus ==
In 2010 a mural depicting characters created by alumnus Tex Avery was painted on school walls. The Looney Tunes murals were being drawn and painted by students down the middle hall of the first floor in the main school building in honor of Avery, creator of Daffy Duck and other characters. The mural competition was reported in the Dallas Morning News, noting students Norma Cruz and Michael Diaz, while News 8 also mentioned these memorials to Tex Avery on February 22, the same day the murals were to be completed. The judging took place on February 24, and on February 26 was a celebration of Tex Avery's birthday. The winner of the competition was assigned to design the new Bulldog mascot for the school.

== Athletics ==
The North Dallas Bulldogs compete in the following sports:

- Baseball
- Basketball
- Cross country
- Football
- Golf
- Soccer
- Softball
- Swimming and diving
- Tennis
- Track and field
- Volleyball
- Wrestling

North Dallas has three varsity team sports that are consistently in the University Interscholastic League State Playoffs: girls' volleyball, boys' soccer and girls' softball. The boys' baseball team plays home games at historic Reverchon Park in Dallas. The baseball team's playoff appearance in 2006 marked its first postseason appearance since 1973.

=== Tennis ===
North Dallas High School has a district-winning tennis team (2011).

=== Football ===
North Dallas High School competes in varsity football.

As of 2017, they have the longest postseason drought in 5A history (since 1952).

=== Powerlifting ===
North Dallas High School had a powerlifting team from 1997 to 2000. This team had several regional winners as well as state qualifiers and winners. It was closed due to budget cuts in 2000.

=== Scholarships ===
North Dallas students who excel in athletics have received scholarships to surrounding universities from the National Collegiate Athletic Association (NCAA). Others students who excel on and off the field often receive scholarships from the National Association of Intercollegiate Athletics (NAIA), and compete in a variety of conferences in sports such as football, baseball, and track.

== Booster Club ==
North Dallas High School has a strong booster club of alumni, most notably from the classes of the 50s through 60s. Alumni meetings are held often and discuss various school topics. Fundraisers, bake sales, car shows, and golf tournaments are held to raise funds for letterman jackets. The club has been successful since the early 1950s.

== Notable alumni ==
- John A. Alonzo — 1953 — American cinematographer, television director and actor; First Mexican-American inducted into the Cinematographer's Union; best known for work on Chinatown (1974) and Scarface (1983).
- Ike Altgens - 1938; photojournalist, photo editor, and field reporter for the Associated Press
- Tex Avery — 1927; director of animated shorts; created Daffy Duck and many elements of Bugs Bunny
- Earle Cabell — United States Representative (1965–1973), Dallas mayor (1961–1964)
- Joe Carter — 1928; charter member of the NFL's Philadelphia Eagles
- Cecil Crowley — 1926; head basketball coach, Louisiana Tech
- Robert "Bob" Brooks Cullum — Dallas civic leader; co-founder of Tom Thumb-Page Food Stores
- Robert H. Dedman Sr. - 1944; billionaire businessman and philanthropist
- James Lawrence Fly — 1916; chair, Federal Communications Commission; director, American Civil Liberties Union
- Kevin Murray — 1982; All American quarterback for Texas A&M's football team
- Harold Barefoot Sanders, Jr. — 1942 longtime United States District Judge and counsel to President Lyndon B. Johnson who was involved in the desegregation of the DISD
- J.C. "Ironman" Wetsel - 1929; All American lineman for SMU's football team. Assistant coach, Vanderbilt University and SMU

== Other ==
North Dallas High School served as the location of the Uptown Campus of Fellowship Church until a permanent facility was opened in June 2006.

The school was used in the TV show Walker, Texas Ranger in episodes such as "Devil's Turf" (S5.E18) and "Soul of Winter" (S6.E22).

The school has a strong Young Life program.
