= CityPlace at Buckhead =

Residential complex in Atlanta, Georgia

Coordinates: 33.8486°N 84.3537°W

CityPlace at Buckhead was an approved residential complex that planned to include eight 493 ft (150m), tall, 42 floor, skyscrapers and a 27 floor, 353 ft (108m) tall building, in Atlanta, Georgia, United States. It was planned to take up 19.5 acres (79,000 m^{2}), have almost 5,000,000 square feet (460,000 m^{2}) of residential space and 95,000 square feet (8,800 m^{2}) of retail space, and 3,800 units. It was approved July 27, 2006, and was being designed by Arquitectonica.

In October 2009 the property was foreclosed on and returned to the lender, Wells Fargo Bank. As of April 2011 the property was back up for sale.

== See also ==
- List of tallest buildings in Atlanta
