= Uptown, Dallas =

Coordinates: 32°48′02″N 96°47′59″W

Uptown Dallas
- Interactive map of Uptown Dallas
- Country: United States
- State: Texas
- County: Dallas
- City: Dallas

Area
  - Land: 0.925 sq mi (2.396 km^{2})
  - Water: 0 sq mi (0 km^{2}) 0%
- Elevation: 472 ft (144 m)

Population (2014)
  - Total: 19,979
  - Density: 21,598.91/sq mi (8,339.39/km^{2})
- ZIP code: 75201, 75204
- Area codes: 214, 469, 972
- Website: www.uptowndallas.net

Uptown is a PID (public improvement district) and a dense neighborhood in Dallas, Texas. Uptown is north of and adjacent to downtown Dallas, and is bordered by US 75 (Central Expressway) on the east, Blackburn Street on the northeast, the Katy Trail on the northwest, Bookhout Street and Cedar Springs Road on the west, N Akard Street on the southwest and Spur 366 (Woodall Rodgers Freeway) on the south.

Uptown is one of the most pedestrian-friendly areas in all of Texas. It is largely "new urbanist" in scope; the majority of facilities considered "Uptown institutions" are relatively new and were created during the late 20th and early 21st Centuries' new urbanist urban planning movement. Popular with young professionals, mixed-use development is the norm and an increasingly pedestrian culture continues to thrive.

== History ==
The Uptown area was originally outside the city limits of Dallas, and was home to those not welcome in the city. The west side, near present-day Harry Hines Boulevard, once hosted a large Hispanic neighborhood known as Little Mexico. The east side, now anchored by Cityplace Center, was the site of the Freedmen's Town established by freed African-American slaves. Very little of this working-class history remains, with the Hispanic west being turned into high-rise buildings, and the African-American east being destroyed by the construction of Central Expressway and Woodall Rodgers Freeway. All that remains of Freedmen's Town is the Freedmen's Cemetery, which gained national recognition when Central Expressway reconstruction revealed over 1,100 graves beneath existing and proposed roadways.

Until the late 1990s, this area was simply called the eastern part of Oak Lawn, but was re-branded as "Uptown" in the early 2000s to attract real estate investment.

== About ==
Uptown is one of the most pedestrian-friendly areas in the city of Dallas. It is largely "new urbanist" in scope; the majority of facilities considered "Uptown institutions" are relatively new and were created during the late 20th and early 21st Centuries' new urbanist urban planning movement.

The district is one of the most dense in Dallas and is home to a diverse set of establishments including office buildings, residential towers, apartment complexes, retail centers, nightlife strips, and hotels. This mixed-use development practice leads to an urban lifestyle for its residents, unlike the compartmentalized social structures of suburban bedroom communities and office parks which make up the majority of Dallas and its suburbs.

68.9% of Uptown residents hold a bachelor's degree or higher, and the median household income is $79,699.

== Economy ==
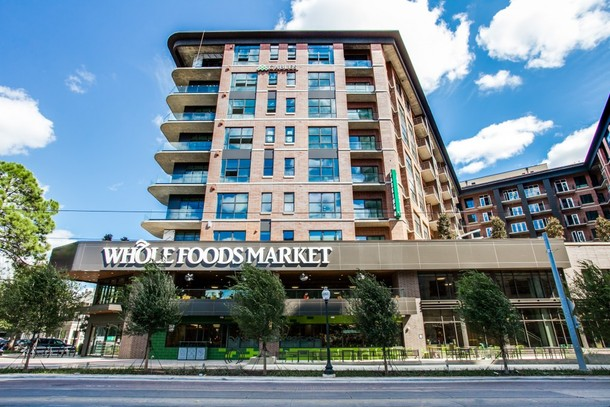
Whole Foods Uptown Dallas

Businesses continuously relocate to Uptown Dallas to attract educated millennial workers who tend to demand the urban lifestyle that the neighborhood offers. Consequently, despite the boom of high-rise construction in Uptown, the commercial vacancy rate continues to drop and is currently 11.7%, compared to the vacancy rate of 20% in downtown.

The educated nature of Uptown residents greatly benefits elite firms such as McKinsey & Company, Boston Consulting Group, Bain & Company, Deloitte, and Goldman Sachs, all of which are located in the neighborhood. Additionally, two Fortune 500 companies call Uptown home: Dean Foods and Holly Frontier.

Along with commercial high-rises, residential buildings are also going up quickly in Uptown. The newest apartments in Uptown cost an average of $1,800 per month, compared to the Dallas average of $888 per month. Recent projects include the Carlisle & Vine, which consists of 131 apartment homes, and a Whole Foods Market store on the ground level fronting McKinney Avenue.

== Education ==
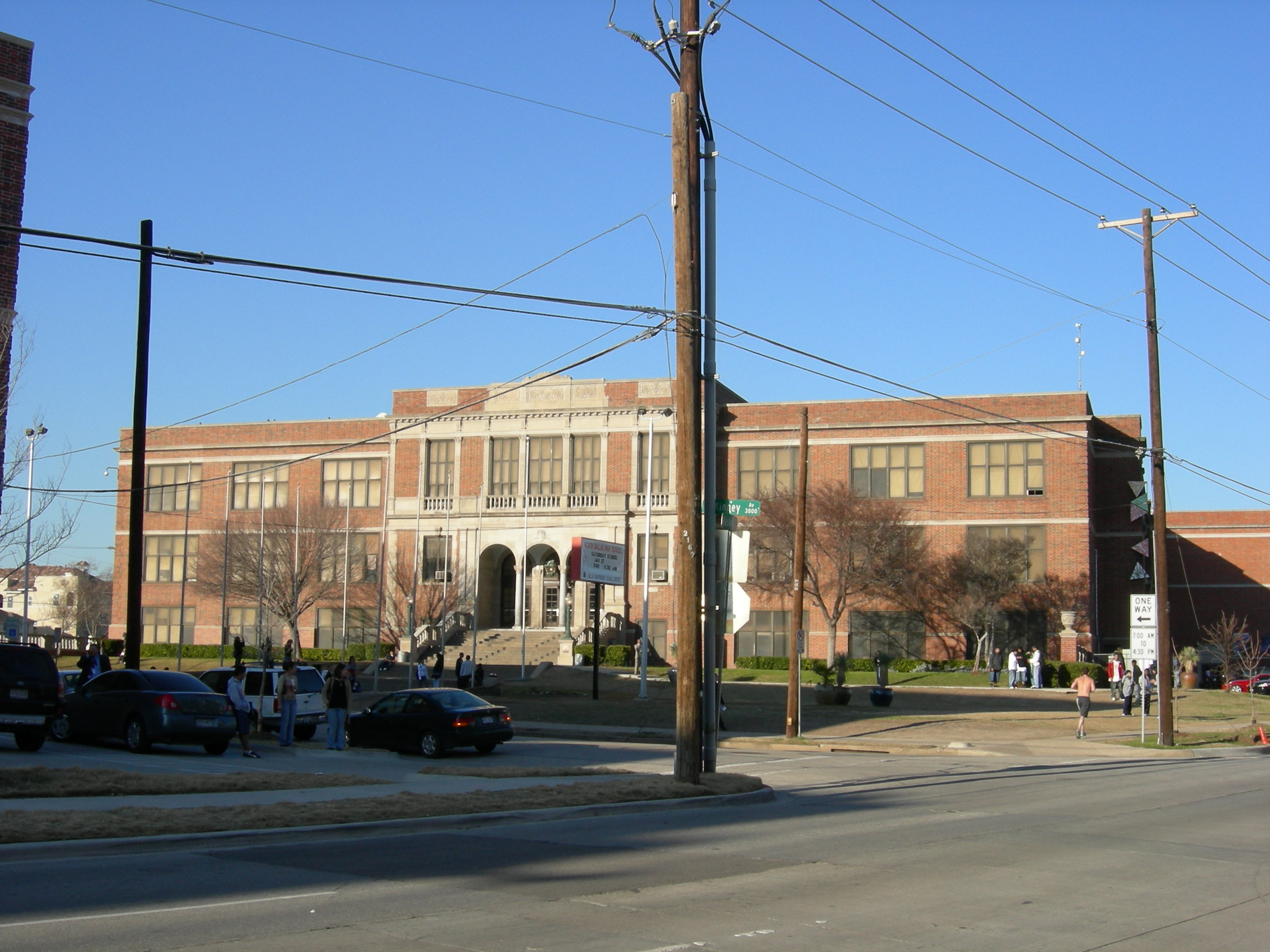
North Dallas High School

=== Public (Dallas ISD) ===
Residents are within the Dallas Independent School District.

Houston Elementary School and Milam Elementary School cover portions of Uptown. All residents are zoned to Rusk Middle School and North Dallas High School. The William B. Travis Academy/Vanguard for the Academically Talented and Gifted is located in Uptown.

The Roman Catholic Diocese of Dallas manages Catholic schools. Notre Dame School of Dallas, for intellectually disabled children, is in Uptown.

== Transportation ==
=== Major highways ===
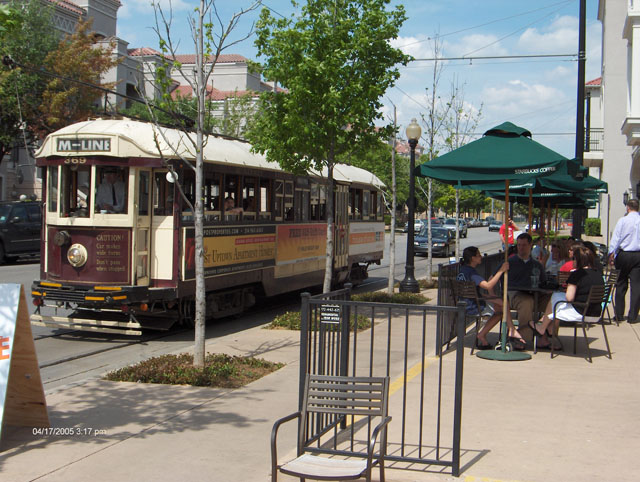
The McKinney Avenue Trolley

- U.S. Highway 75 - (Central Expressway)
- Spur 366 (Woodall Rodgers Freeway)

=== Streetcars ===
- MATA: M-Line Trolley

The M-Line Trolley is a heritage streetcar that provides service between Cityplace/Uptown station in Uptown and St Paul station in Downtown. Service is free.
The M-Line features 40 dedicated stops serving key destinations including: the West Village, McKinney Avenue, Klyde Warren Park, the Dallas Arts District, four historical cemeteries, and the State Thomas historic neighborhood.

=== Trains ===
==== Light rail ====
- DART: Blue Line, Red Line and Orange Line
  - Cityplace Station
- DART: Green Line and Orange Line
  - Victory Station (in Victory Park)
- Trinity Railway Express (TRE)
  - Victory Station (in Victory Park)

== Neighborhoods ==
- West Village
- State Thomas
- McKinney Ave
- The Pearl
- Oak Lawn (partially Uptown)
- Turtle Creek (partially Uptown)
- Victory Park (partially Uptown)
