= Tandy Center Subway =

Former subway system in Fort Worth, Texas

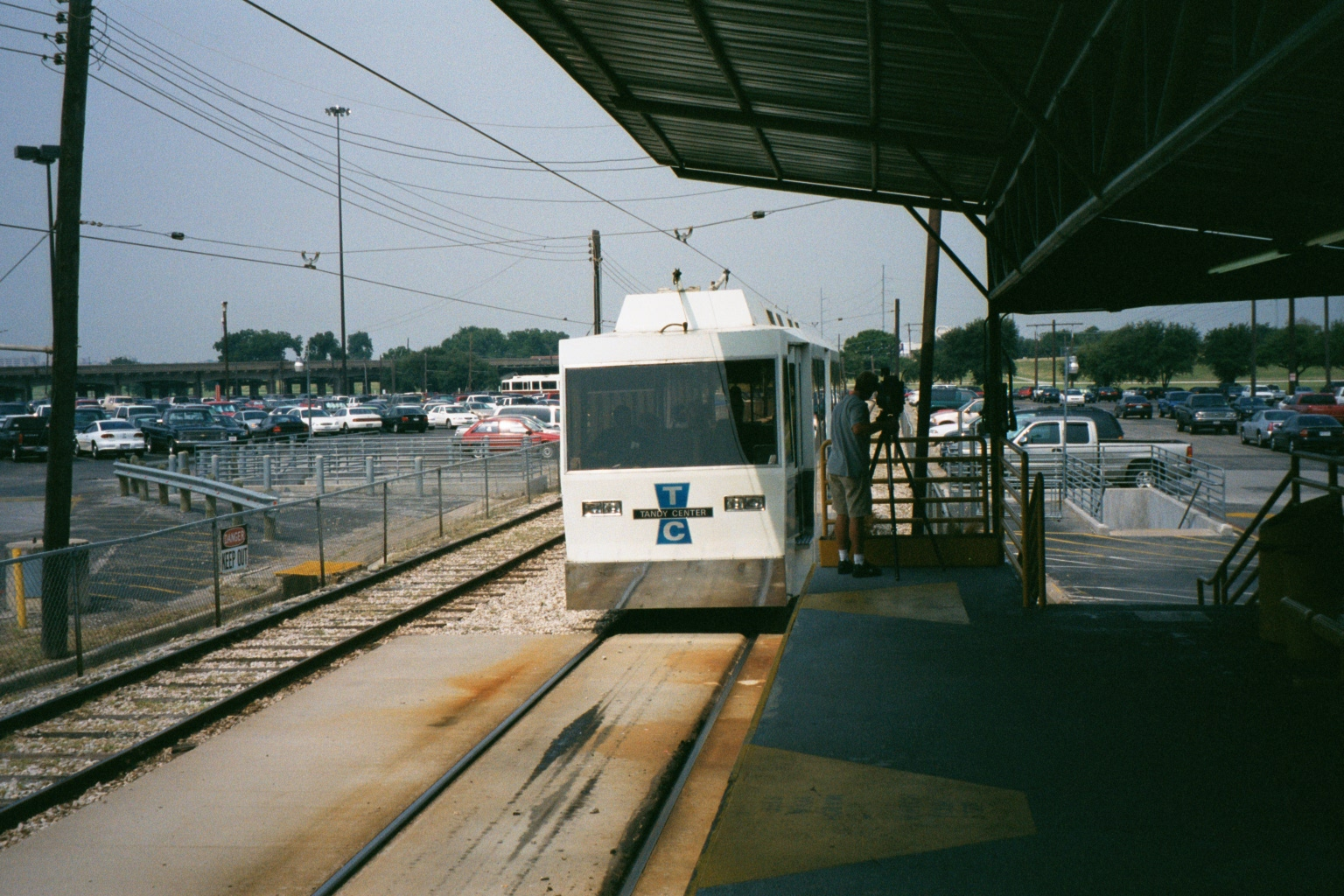
- A Tandy Center Subway car on the last day of service in 2002

Service
- Type: Tram

History
- Opened: February 15, 1963
- Closed: August 30, 2002

Technical
- Line length: 0.7 mi (1.1 km)

The Tandy Center Subway was a small rapid transit system that operated in Fort Worth, Texas, from February 15, 1963 to August 30, 2002. It ran a distance of 0.7 miles (1.1 km) and was, during the period of its operation, the only privately owned subway in the United States.

== History ==
The subway was originally built by Leonard's Department Store in 1963, connecting the store to its large parking lots on the edge of downtown. Originally known as the Leonard's M&O Subway, it consisted of one underground station beneath the store and four stations in the parking lots. Between 1962 and 1966, Leonard's acquired a total of 15 PCC streetcars from DC Transit in Washington, D.C. These had been manufactured by the St. Louis Car Company in the 1930s and 1940s.

The Tandy Corporation purchased the department store, its parking lots, and the subway in 1967. Dillard's operated the store and subway, under the name Dillard's Metro Liner, for a short amount of time there after. The corporation built its headquarters, the Tandy Center, on the site in 1974. Although it demolished the original store, Tandy retained the subway.

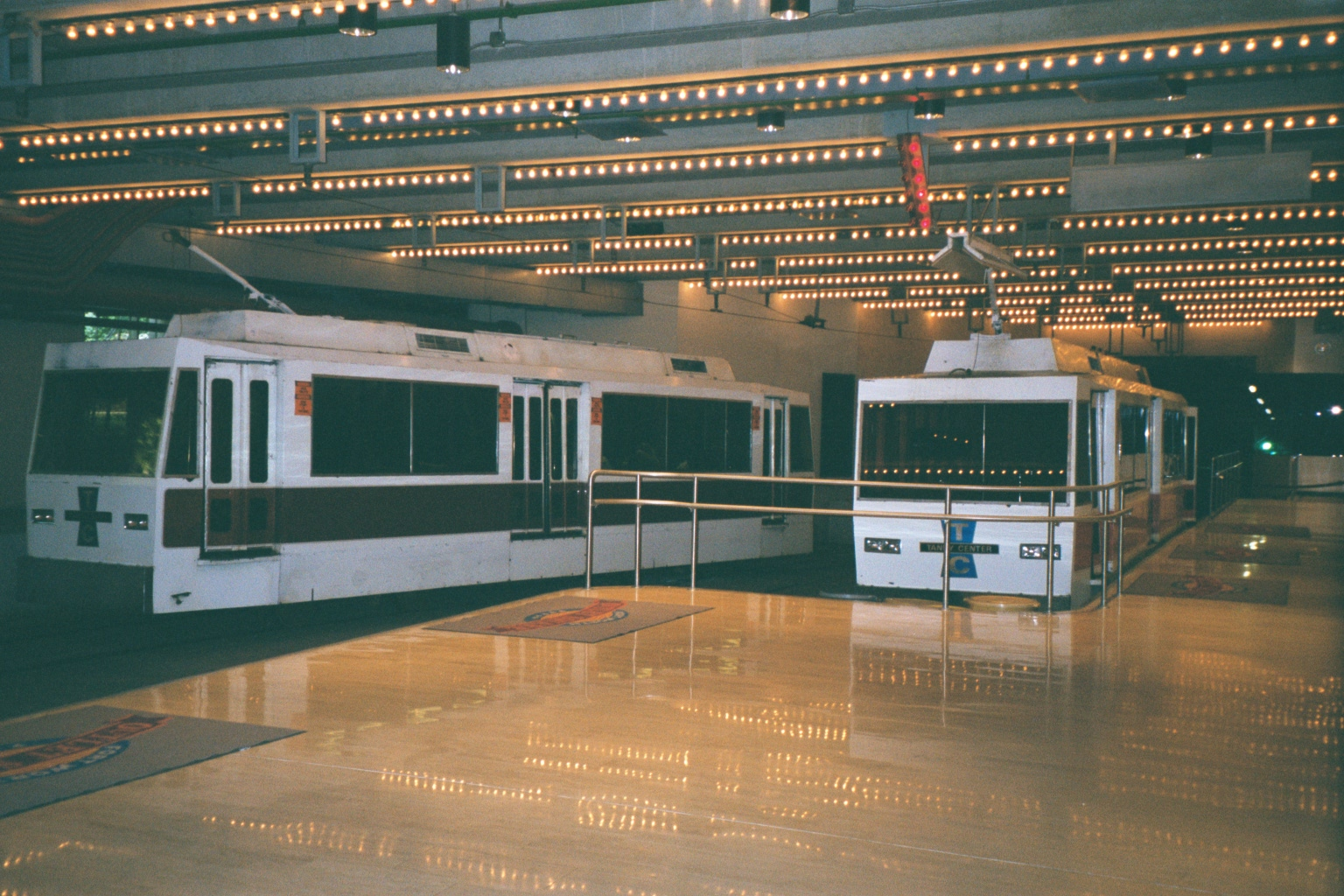
Streetcars at the terminal in 2002

The small subway primarily served patrons visiting the mall at the base of the Tandy Center, which also linked to the downtown location of Fort Worth Public Library. However, the anchor tenant moved out in 1995 and the mall declined. The Tandy Center Subway ceased operation on August 30, 2002.

After the closure, one of the streetcars used on the subway was acquired by Dallas's McKinney Avenue Transit Authority, which modified it to again make it suitable for in-street use, and it operated in service on the McKinney Avenue heritage streetcar line in Dallas until the mid-to late 2000s. Nicknamed "Winnie" for its shape, it had repeated mechanical failures during its short service life. As of 2012, it remains in storage in Dallas, out of use.

"Leonard's number one" was the first PCC streetcar to run the line in 1963, the subway car was originally manufactured by the St. Louis Car Co. between 1937 and 1944 in Washington, D.C., with custom made air conditioning and heating. The number one car is the only one of five original subway cars to survive. In April 1982 the car was saved from the cutting torch by a Tandy computer programmer and stored on a farm south of Fort Worth, where it remained for over 25 years. On February 2, 2008, it was moved to a restoration location near Benbrook, Texas. As of 2013, Leonard's number one is on public display in the lobby of Texas Capital Bank, Fort Worth (One City Place).

A second car, nicknamed "Ms. Marty" was stored in a warehouse after the closure of the subway, and was relocated when said warehouse was demolished for the Panther Island Project. Miss Marty has been relocated to a Trinity Metro maintenance facility for storage.

Parts of the tunnels that ran the cars still exist but currently closed off to the public. Due to the subway station being located directly under the street, it remains to this day, with the gaps in-between the subway platforms filled in, and the tunnel gated off. The end of the tunnel opening into the parking lots was buried during construction of the Tarrant County College Trinity River Campus. In 2015, Gordon Dickson with Lauren Leonard, the great-granddaughter of Obie Leonard and cousin Marty Leonard, daughter of founder Marvin Leonard, visited the tunnel with asset manager for Spire Realty Group Ryan Johnson. During that visit, Marty Leonard signed “Remember the M&O,” with date and name on the wall closing off the tunnel.

== See also ==
- Dillard's, which bought out Leonard's in 1974.
- North Texas Historic Transportation
