= M-Line Trolley =

Heritage streetcar line in Dallas, Texas

McKinney Avenue Transit Authority M-Line Trolley

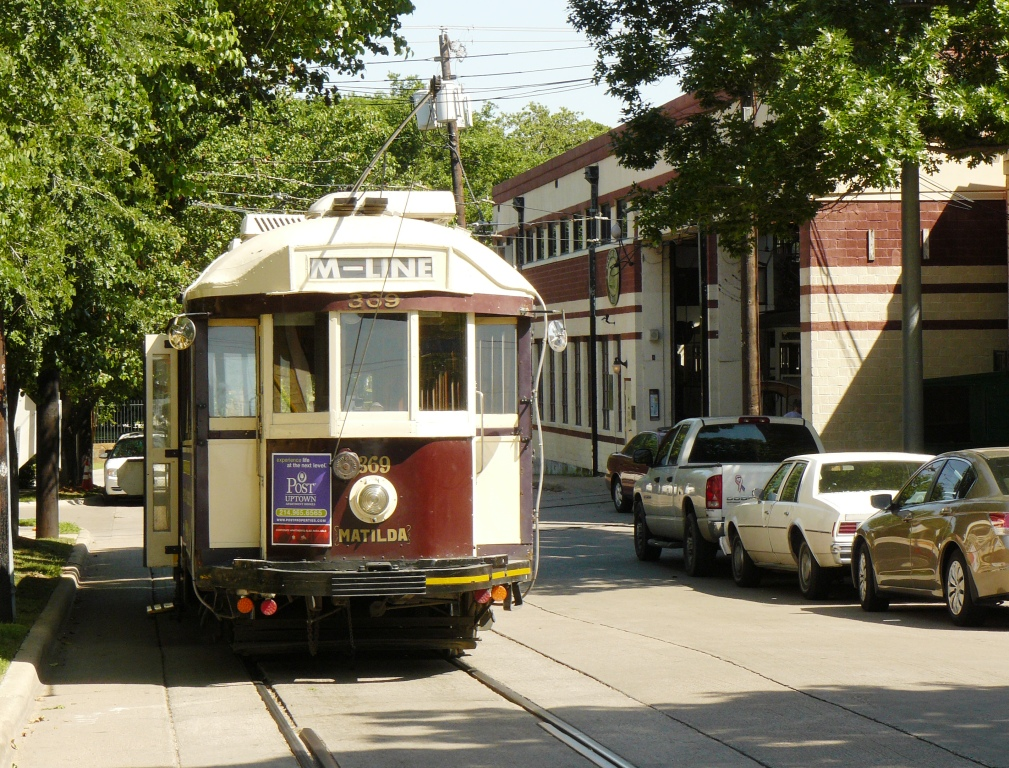
- M-Line car Matilda on Bowen Ave outside the car barn.

Operation
- Locale: Dallas, Texas
- Open: July 22, 1989
- Routes: M-Line Trolley
- Owner: MATA
- Operator: MATA

Infrastructure
- Track gauge: 4 ft 8 1/2 in (1,435 mm) standard gauge
- Propulsion system: Electric
- Electrification: Overhead line, 600 V DC
- Depots: 3153 Oak Grove, Dallas
- Stock: Various (see below)

Statistics
- Route length: 4.6 mi (7.4 km)
- Stops: 40
- 2021 Ridership: 677,694 ▲14%
Overview
M-Line Trolley highlighted in brown
- Website: https://www.mata.org/ McKinney Avenue Transit Authority

The M-Line Trolley (previously McKinney Avenue Trolley) is a heritage streetcar line in the Uptown neighborhood of Dallas, Texas. The trolley line, which has been in service since 1989, uses restored historic streetcar vehicles, as opposed to modern replicas.

The M-Line Trolley operates every day. The line runs along McKinney Avenue between West Village and Klyde Warren Park before leaving McKinney to service the Dallas Arts District. It connects to the DART rail system at Cityplace/Uptown on the northern end and St. Paul on the southern end.

The "M-Line" name was officially adopted in 2002 following the route's expansion beyond McKinney Avenue, but locals sometimes refer to it using its previous "McKinney Avenue Trolley" name. To avoid confusion with the Dallas Streetcar, a separate modern streetcar operating in northern Oak Cliff, M-Line vehicles are typically referred to as "trolleys" or "cars", not "streetcars".

The trolley is operated by the McKinney Avenue Transit Authority (MATA), a non-profit organization. The trolley is free to the public thanks to donations, as well as a joint operating subsidy from Dallas Area Rapid Transit (DART) and the Uptown Improvement District.

== History ==
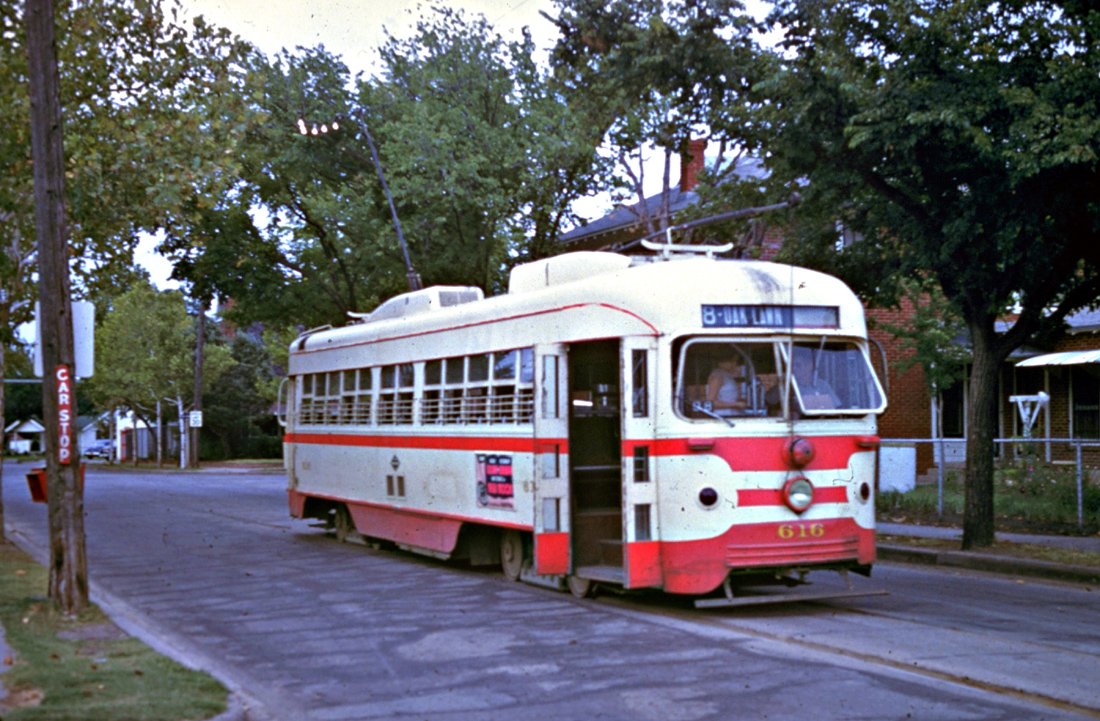
A Dallas PCC streetcar, c. 1948

Metropolitan Dallas had an extensive network of streetcar lines from the late 19th century through 1930s. Before the McKinney Avenue Transit Authority (MATA) began operations in 1989, the last streetcar ran in Dallas until January 15 1956. Numerous maps of the old trolley routes are available online.

During the 1980s, there was a movement to restore streetcar service in Dallas's Uptown neighborhood after some of the original rails were uncovered on McKinney Avenue. Dallas streetcar enthusiast and collector, Ed Landrum and restauranteur, Phil Cobb incorporated the non-profit, McKinney Avenue Transit Authority in 1983 with the intent to return streetcars to historic McKinney Avenue. At 2:08 a.m. on January 14, 1986, exactly 30 years to the minute after the last scheduled streetcar rolled into the barn, MATA signed a lease for the building on Bowen Avenue which was to become their new car barn. New rails were first laid in September 1988 near Hall Street. The initial infrastructure would be in place in the summer of 1989. On July 22, 1989, Dallas saw a return of the streetcar as car 122 broke a celebratory banner.

In 1995, the agency had to fix a subsidence in Cole Avenue causing a dip in the tracks between Hall and Bowen Streets. About 200 feet of track was replaced.

By the late 1990s, it became apparent that the 110-year-old brick pavement on McKinney Avenue could no longer support modern-day car, truck and bus traffic. Repairs began in July 1999 and were completed in December 2000. The street was repaved with concrete brick and most of the old brick was saved for sidewalks and other amenities. Work was done on one lane of the street at a time. Many times the streetcars were rerouted, sometimes with a shoofly. For several months the north loop was inaccessible due to utility work at Allen and McKinney.

=== First expansion ===
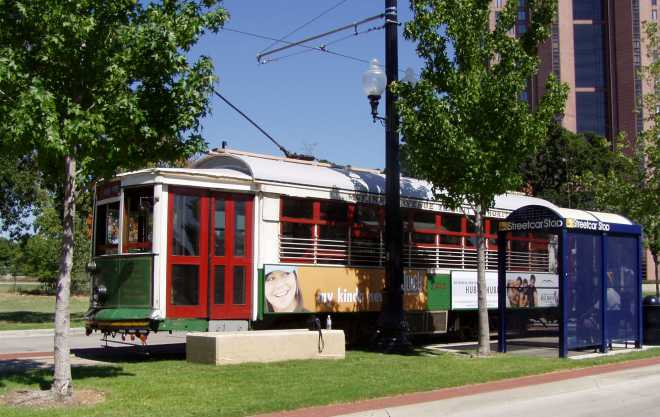
M-Line car Green Dragon (186) at CityPlace Station.

The first expansion of the system opened in 2002. Both Dallas Area Rapid Transit (DART) and MATA desired the streetcar to meet up with DART's CityPlace subway station a few blocks from the route. The first new track for the CityPlace extension was laid on Cole Avenue south of Blackburn in June 2001. In the summer of 2002 while the tracks were being laid, construction crews unearthed history as old center-of-the-street rail from Dallas Railway and Terminal tracks were discovered on Cole Avenue. On May 6, 2002, the extension was opened for the public (after a ceremonial opening on April 13, 2002, without service starting). It is now possible to ride the DART rail system and get off at CityPlace station and board the streetcar to Uptown. Effective May 6, 2002, all service on the line became free. The extension increased the line's length to 3.8 miles (6.1 km). The line was given the name "the M-Line" in the local transit system at this time.

=== Second expansion ===
MATA founders, Cobb and Landrum, as well as MATA's Board, downtown interests and DART felt that an extension of the trolley line into near downtown would be a good next move. Originally the focus of the expansion planning centered on the West End entertainment area via a right turn from St. Paul onto Ross Avenue to Lamar Street, from Lamar to San Jacinto Street and returning east along San Jacinto to either St. Paul or Olive Street thence north returning to McKinney Avenue. Relocation of electric utility vaults proved too costly and so an expansion task force, headed by MATA board members, Michael Anderson and Otto Wetzel, developed the St. Paul, Federal, Olive route that is currently in use. This alignment was to be built in two separate projects beginning with the original plan for a line to split off from the current line at McKinney and Olive Streets and travel down Olive to the light rail transit mall downtown near Pearl Station. This was to be followed by the St. Paul to Federal alignment. The connection of these two extensions would create the long sought, "downtown loop" for the trolley as well as serving DART via a cross block connection with St. Paul station. The City of Dallas and MATA continued working together to expand the streetcar system past the southern terminus further into downtown. This unique public/private partnership has been one of the hallmarks of the M-Line’s success.

Part of the money needed for the expansion was put to voters in the form of a bond. On November 7, 2006, the voters of Dallas approved Proposition One, which asked voters if they would like to approve "The Issuance of $390,420,000 general obligation bonds for street and transportation improvements." The bond was approved 87.4% to 12.6%. Engineering for the project was to follow, with construction planned for 2010.

On Thursday, July 8, 2010, it was announced that the federal government would grant an additional $5 million for the M-Line trolley project, specifically to help complete the downtown loop for the McKinney Avenue trolley line, and the line will be able to run faster, more modern cars and penetrate deeper into downtown. On May 4, 2015 MATA started running trolleys on the new downtown extension. The line extended past Ross Avenue, making a loop along Federal Street and Olive Street and then reconnecting to the line on McKinney Avenue. The new line formally opened on June 5, 2015 followed by a public celebration event held on June 6, 2015. The event encouraged citizens to ride the free trolley and send pictures via social media for a chance to win one of several prize packages from local businesses. Two dozen other local uptown and downtown businesses participated in the event by offering free samples and discounts.

=== Future ===
The rails may one day be connected to the (newer) Dallas Streetcar line.

== Rolling stock ==
Number	Name	Year	Builder	Original locale/operator	Status
122	Crescent Rose/Rosie	1909	Brill	Porto, Portugal	in service
166		1909	Brill	Porto, Portugal	withdrawn
143	Winnie	1945	St. Louis	Capital Transit Company	awaiting restoration
183		1913	St. Louis	Dallas Railways	awaiting restoration
186	Green Dragon	1913	St. Louis	Dallas Consolidated Electric Street Ry	in service
189	Green Goddess	1913	St. Louis	Dallas Railways	withdrawn
323		1915	Stone & Webster	Northern Texas Traction Company	withdrawn
332		1912	NTTC	Northern Texas Traction Company	withdrawn
369	Matilda	1925	Moore	Melbourne & Metropolitan Tramways Board	in service
636	Petunia	1920	Brill	Dallas Railway Co.	in service
754	Betty	1926	American	Dallas Railway & Terminal Co.	in service
1979		1993	Gomaco	MATA Trolley (Memphis, Tennessee)	under restoration
3334		1945	Pullman	Dallas Railway & Terminal Co.	withdrawn
4613		1951	CC&F	Toronto Transportation Commission	awaiting restoration
4614	Margaret	1951	CC&F	Toronto Transportation Commission	in service
7169	Emma	1971	B&N	Société des Transports Intercommunaux de Bruxelles	in service
––	Miss Daisy	?	Fairmont		in service

=== In service ===
==== 122 - Crescent Rose or Rosie ====
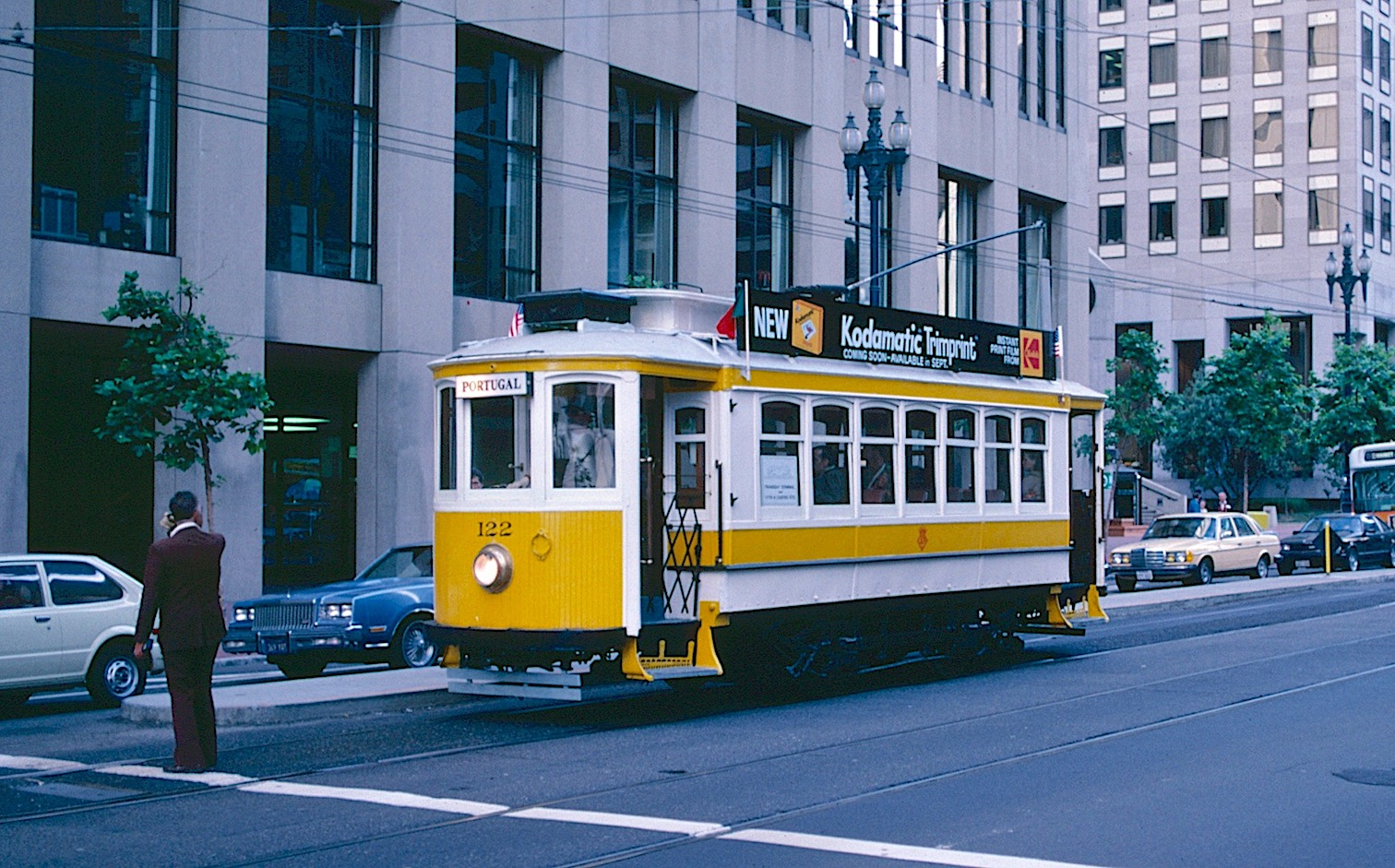
Car 122 running in the 1983 San Francisco Historic Trolley Festival a year before being acquired by MATA

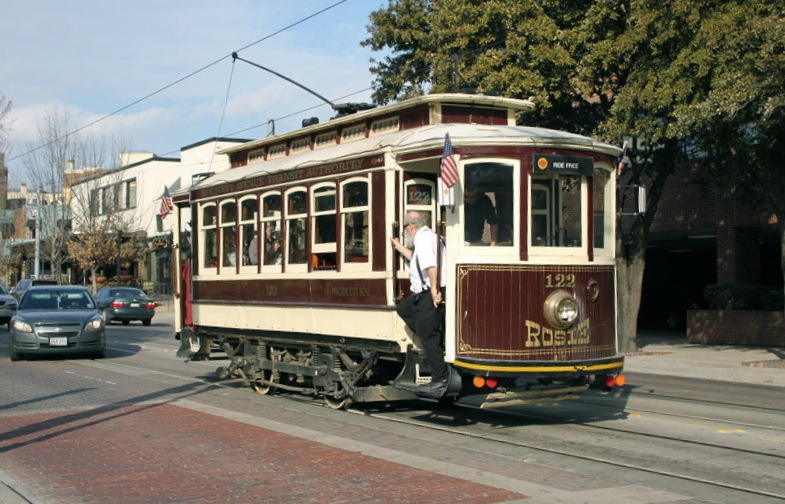
Rosie on McKinney Avenue in 2011

Car 122 was built to a standard American design by the J. G. Brill Company of Philadelphia in 1909 for export to Porto, Portugal. Rosie is similar to early streetcars that once operated in Dallas. 122 was retired from service on the Porto streetcar system in 1978, and was brought to the U.S. in the early 1980s by Gales Creek Enterprises (GCE), of Oregon, purchased by Portland businessmen Bill and Sam Naito for possible use on a then-proposed heritage streetcar line in Portland. GCE refurbished it at the Oregon Electric Railway Museum for use, on loan, in the first San Francisco Historic Trolley Festival, in summer 1983, and car 122 operated intermittently in service on San Francisco's Market Street in that year; it was painted yellow-and-cream, the colors of its sponsor in the Trolley Festival, Eastman Kodak. In fall 1984, No. 122 was sold to MATA, and it arrived in Dallas around the beginning of 1985. Having previously been refurbished for use in San Francisco, 122 only needed minor work to bring it into service on MATA's opening day. However, in the late 1990s car 122 received a more extensive restoration. Shortly afterward, 122 developed motor problems which kept it in the barn. These problems have been solved and 122 is currently the oldest streetcar in daily service in North America.

In July 2020, MATA unveiled an extensive restoration of Car 122 to preserve and restore its distinctive woodwork, stained glass, and metalwork.

==== 186 - Green Dragon ====
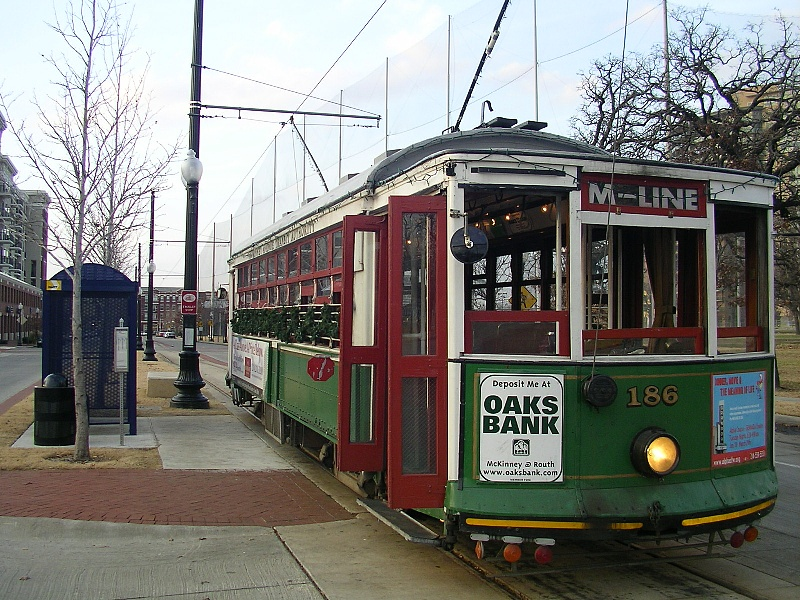
Green Dragon running a M-Line service, 2004.

186 was built by the St. Louis Car Co. for Dallas Consolidated Electric Street Railway in 1913. The car served for 43 years in Dallas before being retired in 1956, when the streetcar system was abandoned. 186 was stripped of its running gear and electrical wiring and sold to a private individual who used it for a hay barn in far North Dallas. Ed Landrum, one of MATA's founders, acquired the car in 1979 and cosmetically restored it. The Green Dragon was originally displayed in the Texas Sports Hall of Fame in Grand Prairie, Texas. When the museum closed, Landrum removed 186 and donated it to MATA, which restored the Green Dragon to running order in 1989.

==== 369 - Matilda ====
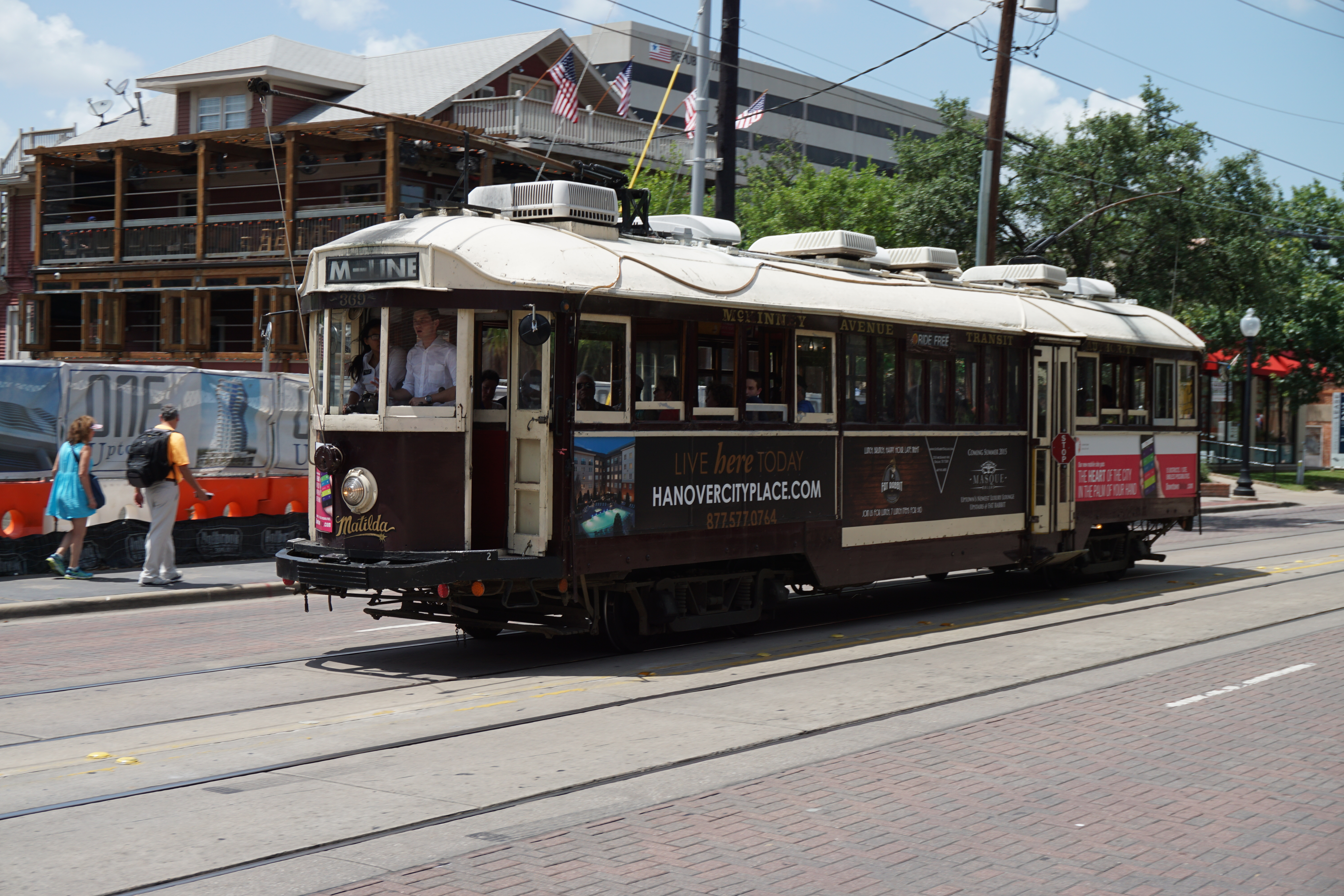
Matilda on McKinney Avenue in 2015

369 was built in 1925 by James Moore, Ltd. for the Melbourne & Metropolitan Tramways Board in Melbourne, Australia. The W2-class car was in continuous service in Melbourne for six decades before being purchased by MATA in 1986. Matilda arrived in Portland, Oregon, by ship and was then trucked to Dallas. Acquired in running order, Matilda only required cosmetic modifications to give her a more North American appearance. In 2008, the car was equipped with air-conditioning (eight roof-mounted units, powered by an inverter hidden under a seat).

==== 636 - Petunia ====
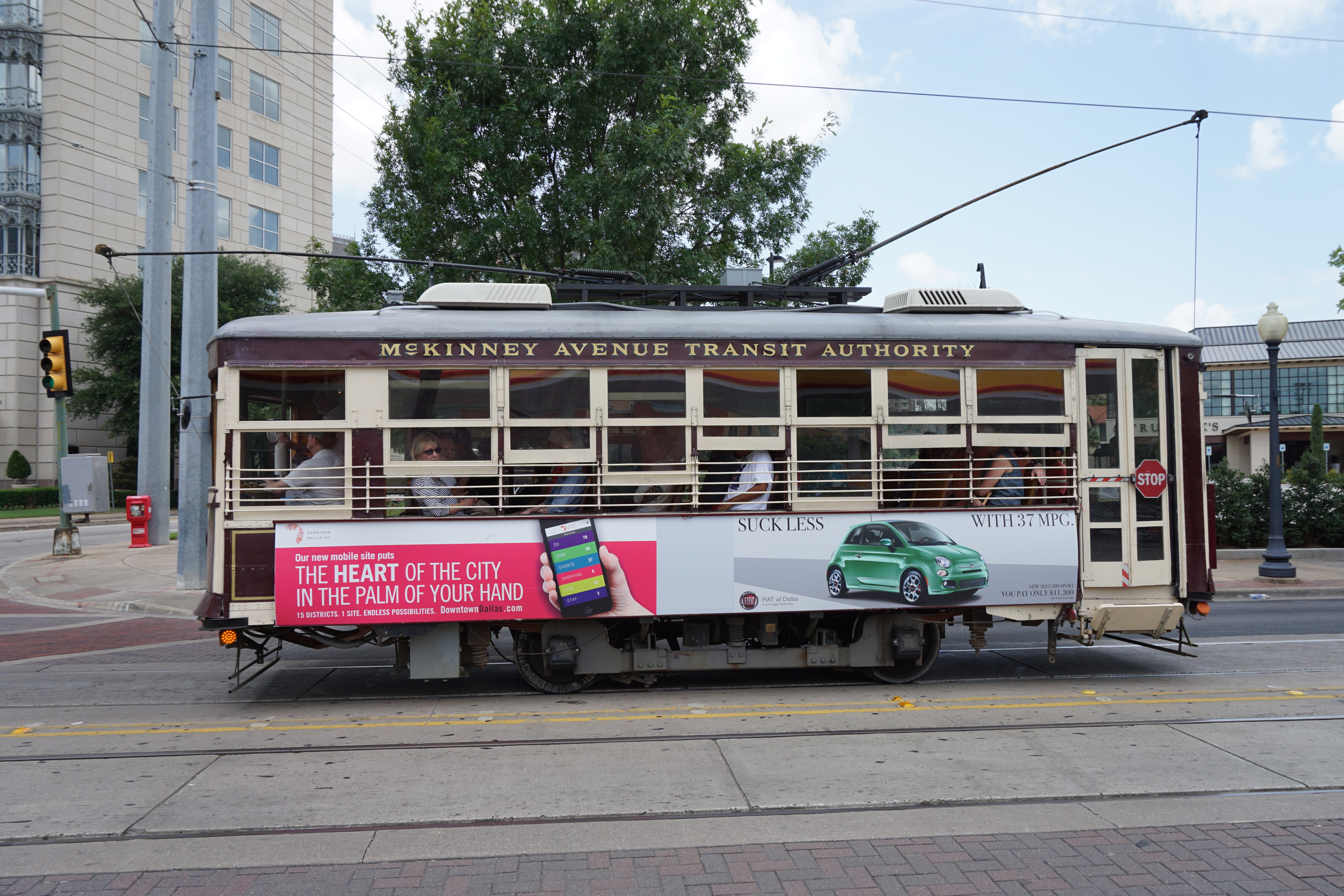
Petunia on McKinney Avenue in 2015

Car 636 was built in 1920 as part of an order for 25 streetcars for the Dallas Railway Co. from the J. G. Brill Company. Petunia, a "Birney Safety Car," (or Birney, for short) is named after its designer, Charles O. Birney of the Stone & Webster Co. The design incorporated numerous operational and safety improvements over earlier streetcars that permitted one man operation and thereby allowed street railway companies to reduce their expenses. Birneys were known for their bouncy riding qualities and were never very popular with the Dallas riding public. Nevertheless, 636 ran in Dallas until 1947 when it was replaced by more modern equipment. MATA's Ed and John Landrum, Frank Schultz and Dean Smith designed and built 636's current 8-foot-long truck using parts from the extra Melbourne trucks purchased along with Car 369. MATA later added shock absorbers to smooth out the Birney's characteristic bouncy ride.

636 is the first of the original cars to be equipped with air-conditioning. A single unit was installed in 2007 as a test, with three more units later installed on the roof to provide full cooling.

After a collision with a cement truck in mid-2013, 636 was out of service for several months while one end of the car was completely reconstructed. At the same time it received a general overhaul that included new wheels, new roof, and a rewiring of the motor control system.

==== 754 - Betty ====
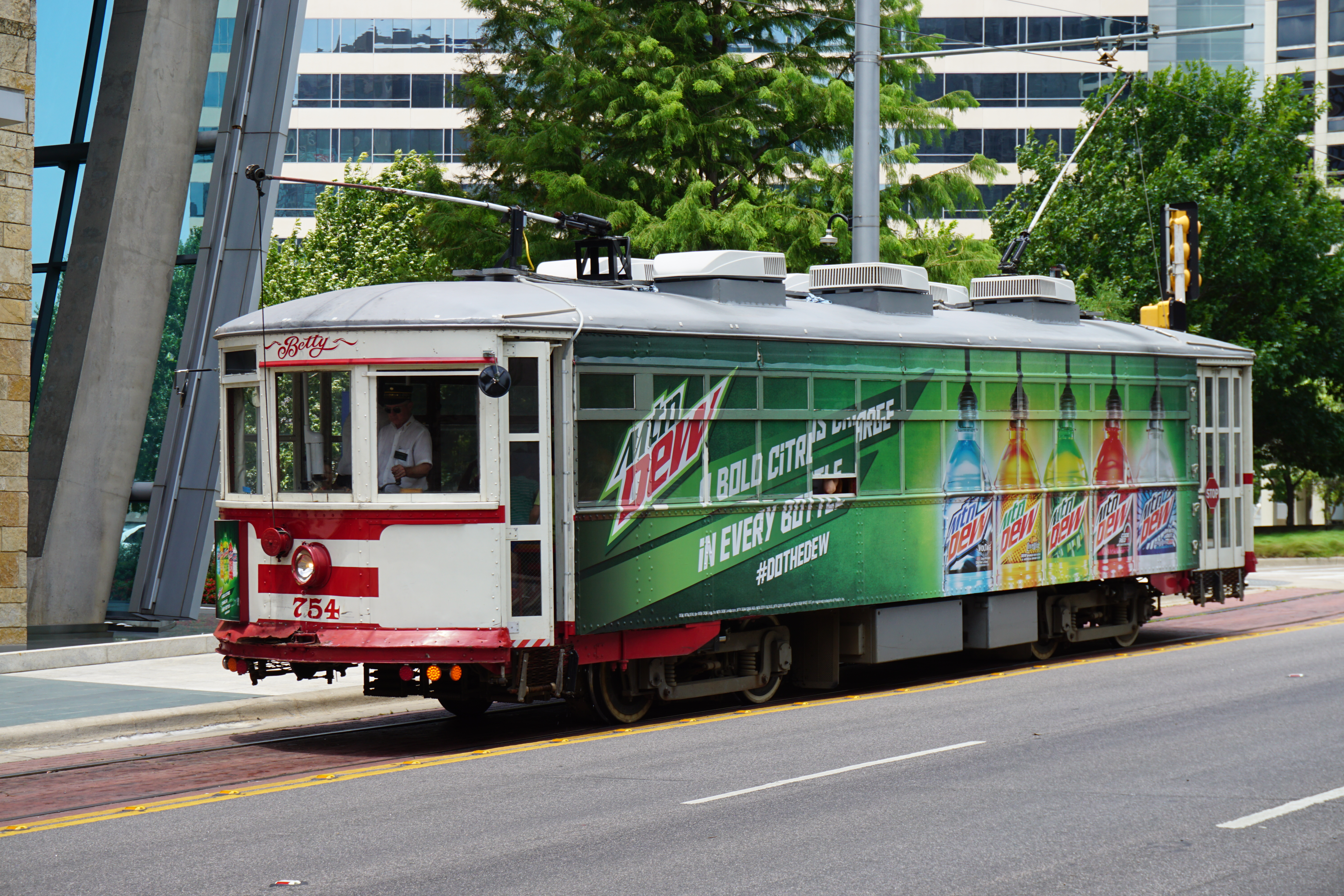
Betty on St. Paul Street in 2015

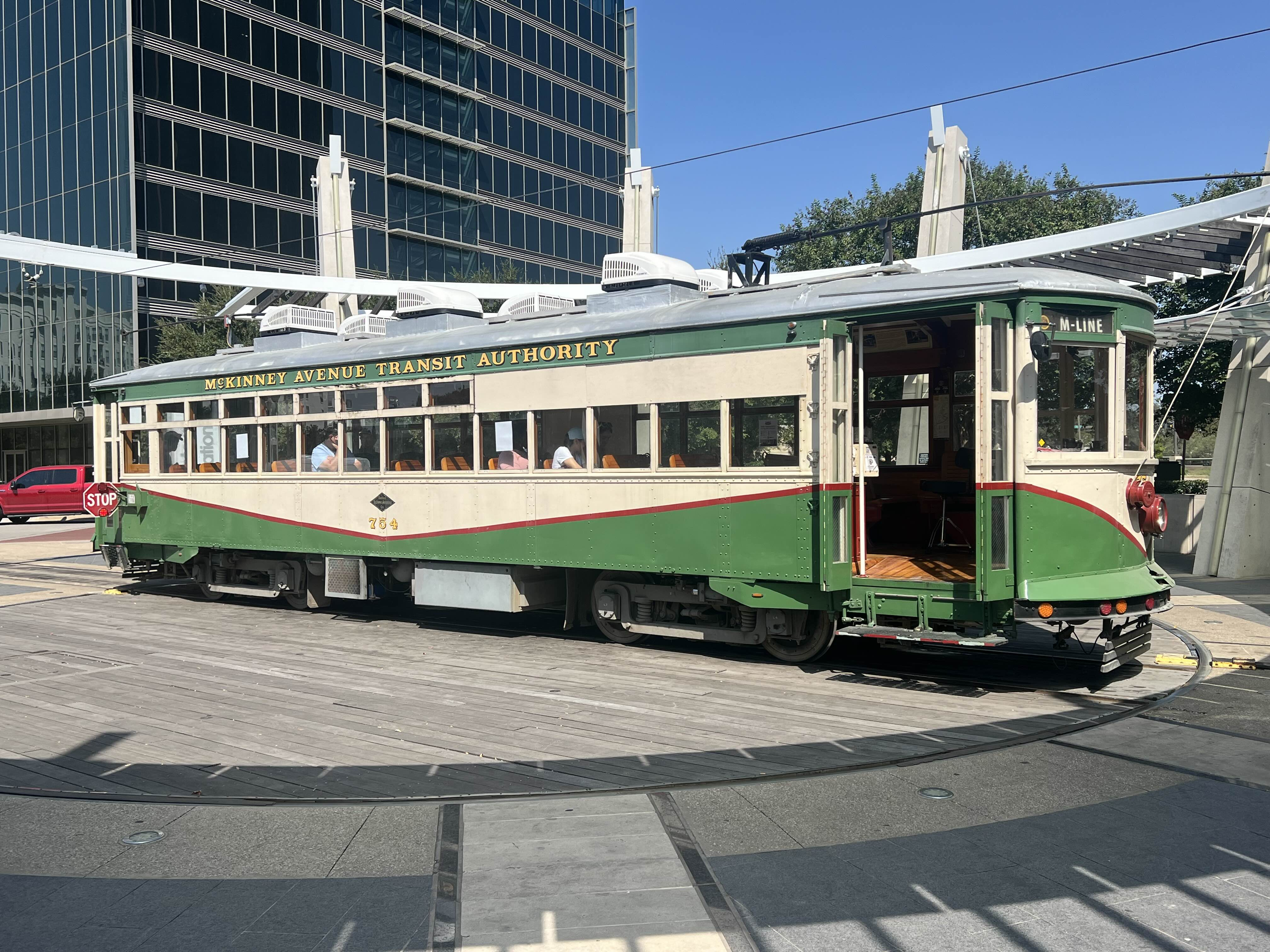
Betty at Uptown Station in 2024

754, a 19-short-ton (17.2 t), 48-foot (14,630 mm), 56-seat streetcar was built in 1926 by American Car Company for Dallas Railway and Terminal Co. It was originally a Peter Witt center entrance car. The DR&T later removed 754's center doors when the company rebuilt each of its Peter Witts for one-man operation. The 754 was on the active DR&T roster until the end of operations in January 1956. Shortly after system abandonment, Ben Carpenter (son of the president of Dallas Railway and Terminal Company from 1927 to 1935) moved 754 to his family's Hackberry Creek Ranch in Irving, Texas, and placed it on concrete blocks. 754 spent its retirement years there serving as a playhouse for the Carpenter children and grandchildren. The family built a miniature town around the car body. When all of his children and grandchildren had grown up, Mr. Carpenter decided it was time to donate the trolley to MATA.

754 was partially restored at EIKON International. On June 21, 2009, 754 was brought by truck to the MATA barn where it was fitted with trucks, AC traction motors, and other various operation components. This car is the first at MATA equipped with AC traction motors and computerized controls.

After a lengthy debugging process of 754's electronic control system, the car began regular service in March 2014.

==== 4614 - Margaret ====
Toronto was once the largest operator of PCCs in the world with 745 cars. Eventually only nineteen Toronto PCCs remained and these were used on only one route — the 509 Harbourfront. The Toronto PCC era ended on December 8, 1995, when the last such cars ran on that line. These PCCs were built in 1951 by CC&F (A8 Class) and extensively rebuilt by the TTC in the early 1990s (as A15 Class), making them the equivalent of almost brand-new streetcars. Not wanting to see these last PCCs scrapped, John Landrum helped Tom Twigge, a Toronto Transit Commission employee, form a coalition of trolley museums to save the remaining cars from being scrapped and find new homes for them. MATA bought two cars, 4613 and 4614. 4614 was refit with a left side door and put in service in 2019. No. 4613 still awaits modification and restoration.

==== 7169 - Emma ====
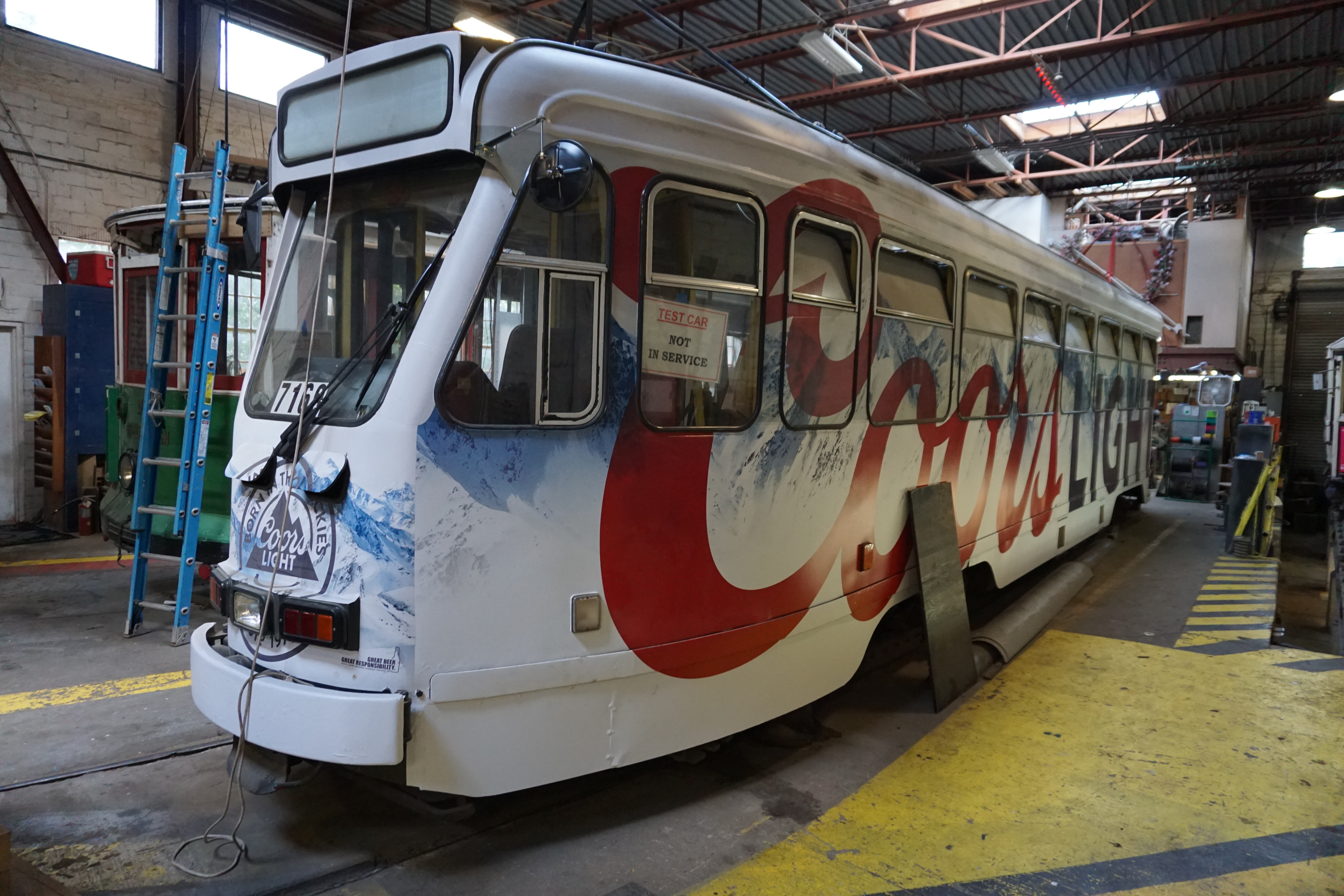
Emma inside the car barn in 2015

7169 is a Brussels-built single-end Westinghouse All-Electric PCC that was bought by MATA in 2013. Trams from the (7000 and 7100 series) were built between 1951 and 1971. The last subtype (7156–7171) were built in 1970 using salvaged components from Johnstown Traction Company PCC trams. MATA modified the car for their operations, including new left-side doors. The car entered regular service in mid 2015.

==== Miss Daisy (no number) ====
Built by the Fairmont Company of Fairmont, Minnesota, around the turn of the 20th century. Cars of this type were widely used by railways all over the world for track inspection. Volunteer Richard Fowler donated Miss Daisy to MATA in complete, but not operable condition. Used with a welder trailer and a rail grinder trailer, Miss Daisy enables MATA personnel to perform minor rail repairs.

=== Awaiting restoration ===
==== 143 - Winnie ====
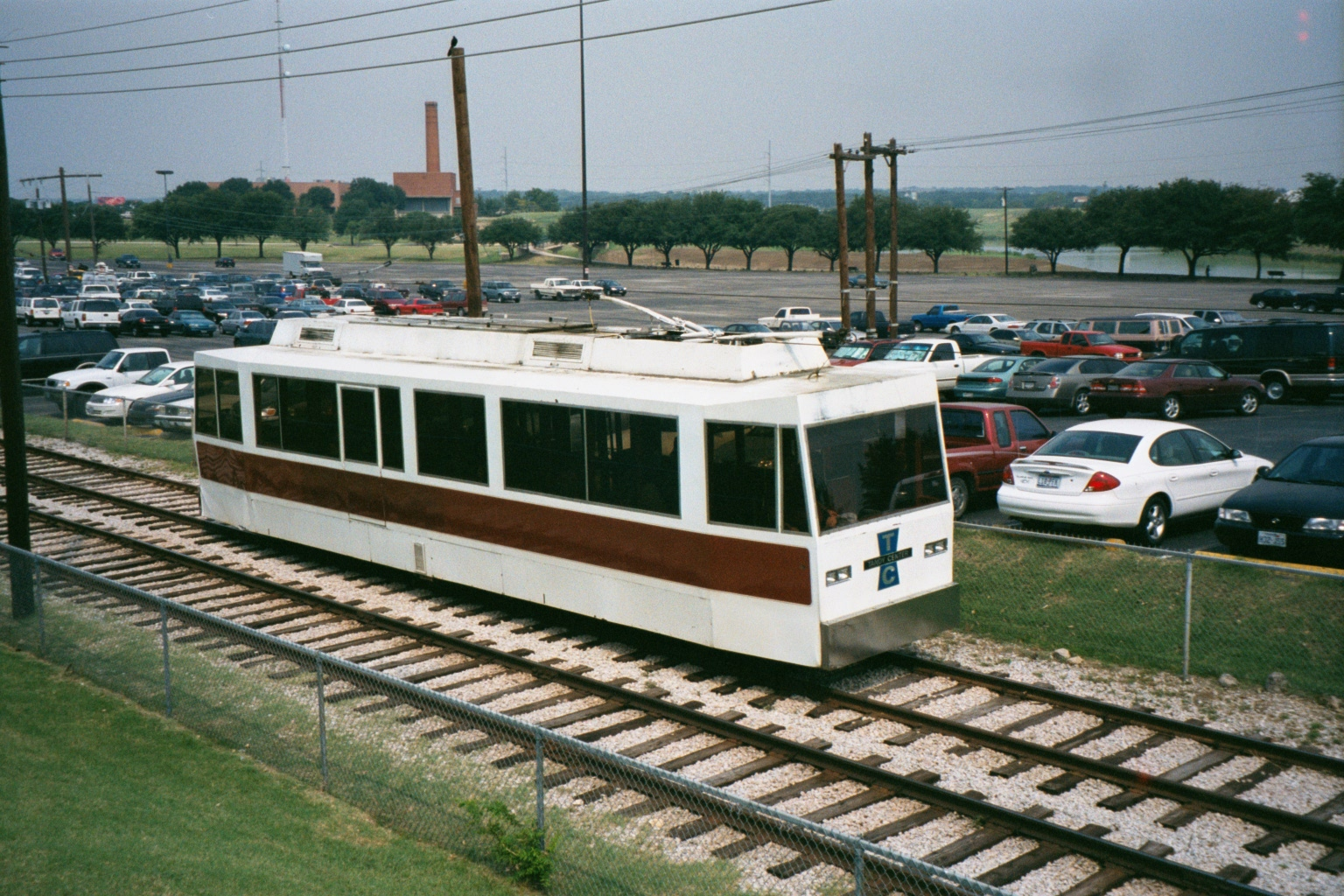
A Tandy Center Subway streetcar.

Built as a single-ended PCC (Presidents' Conference Committee) streetcar by St. Louis Car Company in 1945 for (Washington) DC Transit. Operated by DC Transit as car 1506 until abandonment of that system in February 1962. Bought by Fort Worth's Marvin and Obediah Leonard for their rail shuttle line from their vast parking lot to their downtown department store's basement station via a 1,400-foot subway. It was rebuilt as a double-ended car and given a more "modernized" appearance in Fort Worth — stainless steel siding and blue roof trim. This modification did not completely conceal its standard PCC design heritage. Old 1506 was renumbered as M&O #2. No. 2 served as a Tandy Center Subway car until the line was abandoned on August 30, 2002. Despite modifications to soften the car's lines, it retained a distinctive shape reminiscent of a Winnebago — hence the nickname.

In the 2005-2006 timeframe, attempts were made to put Winnie in service, but it had a series of recurring air-conditioning, mechanical and electrical problems. The car was moved off-site after it was decided repairing Winnie was unfeasible given the need for expanding service.

==== 183 and 189 ====
183 and 189 were built for Dallas Railways in 1913 by St. Louis Car Company. They are typical Stone & Webster designed streetcars, sisters to the operating 186. In 1991, John Landrum discovered the two cars built into a home in Lewisville, a few miles north of Dallas. Since the building was about to be demolished, on January 10, 1994, MATA volunteers went to Lewisville and tore the warehouse down to expose and recover the cars. Car 183 was turned into a parts car but is still visible at MATA storage, car 189 (Green Goddess) was slated for a full restoration in 2000, the front end of the car was even restored by volunteers however plans soon changed as the Ex-Dallas pcc was acquired and all available funds were moved to that project. A replica of car 189's front was then moved to the Canopy hotel on the M-line route and is still on public display as of 2023.

==== 323 ====
323 is a 13-window Stone & Webster "turtleback" type street car built in 1915 as part of an order for 26 such cars for the Northern Texas Traction Company of Ft. Worth. 323 is the only known surviving example of the Stone and Webster "stretch" streetcar. In late 2022 car 323's roof collapsed causing massive amounts of damage to the already aged carbody. The car is no longer considered for restoration and slowly is being stripped of spare parts for car 186.

==== 1979 ====
1979 is a Gomaco built replica of a Brill car (similar to 122/Rosie) built in 1993. 1979 visited the Mckinney Avenue Transit Authority for a few days in 1993 before being delivered to Memphis. 1979 was sold in 2021 to MATA along with former Melbourne W2 car 1978 (original numbered 353). This car has been under restoration since 2023.

==== 4613 (ex-Toronto PCC) ====
See car 4614 above. 4614 has been refit and put in service, while 4613 still remains in storage.

=== Withdrawn ===
==== 332 - The Morning Star ====
332 is one of four box motors built in the Northern Texas Traction Company interurban railway shops in 1912. When NTT ceased operations in 1934, a farmer near Granbury, Texas (southwest of Fort Worth) bought 332 and used it for grain storage. John Landrum, MATA's Chief Operating Officer, purchased the car in 1986 and for many years volunteers worked on its restoration in the MATA car barn. However, restoration of the Morning Star was stopped and it was moved off-site in order to make space for the 2015 expansion of service.

==== 3334 (ex-MBTA 3334, Dallas 612) ====
MATA acquired this double-ended PCC in late 2009. It first operated in Dallas as #612, and was then sold to the Massachusetts Bay Transportation Authority (MBTA), in Boston. Most recently, it was in the Lake Shore Electric Railway (museum) collection. After a thorough assessment of the car's condition and structure, the car itself was deemed to unfit for restoration in late May 2017. Years of service on the streets of Boston had left the car structurally unsound and MATA therefore made the hard decision of scrapping the body of the car. Most of the electrical components have been saved, as well as the trucks for use in future restorations of other PCC cars.

==== G.J. Brill car 166 ====
After MATA bought car 122 a second Brill car of the same type and age was purchased to provide the two-car service that the company and the city of Dallas agreed to. The car was almost ready to be put into service but at the time was stored behind a local uptown restaurant as the car barn was still having the roof raised by seven feet to accommodate the overhead power wires. In the winter of 1985 two children broke into the trolley car and set it on fire. Fortunately the mechanics of the car remained intact but the electronics and wooden body frame were damaged beyond repair. The parts were salvaged and used as spares for 122. MATA car 369 Matilda arrived on January 23, 1987 as a replacement for 166.

== Real-time location finder ==
In late 2014, GPS-based AVL system was installed in the cars, allowing for real-time location information.

== See also ==
- Dallas Streetcar
- Transportation in Dallas, Texas
- Streetcars in North America
