= Cityplace/Uptown station =

DART rail station located in Dallas, Texas

Cityplace/Uptown
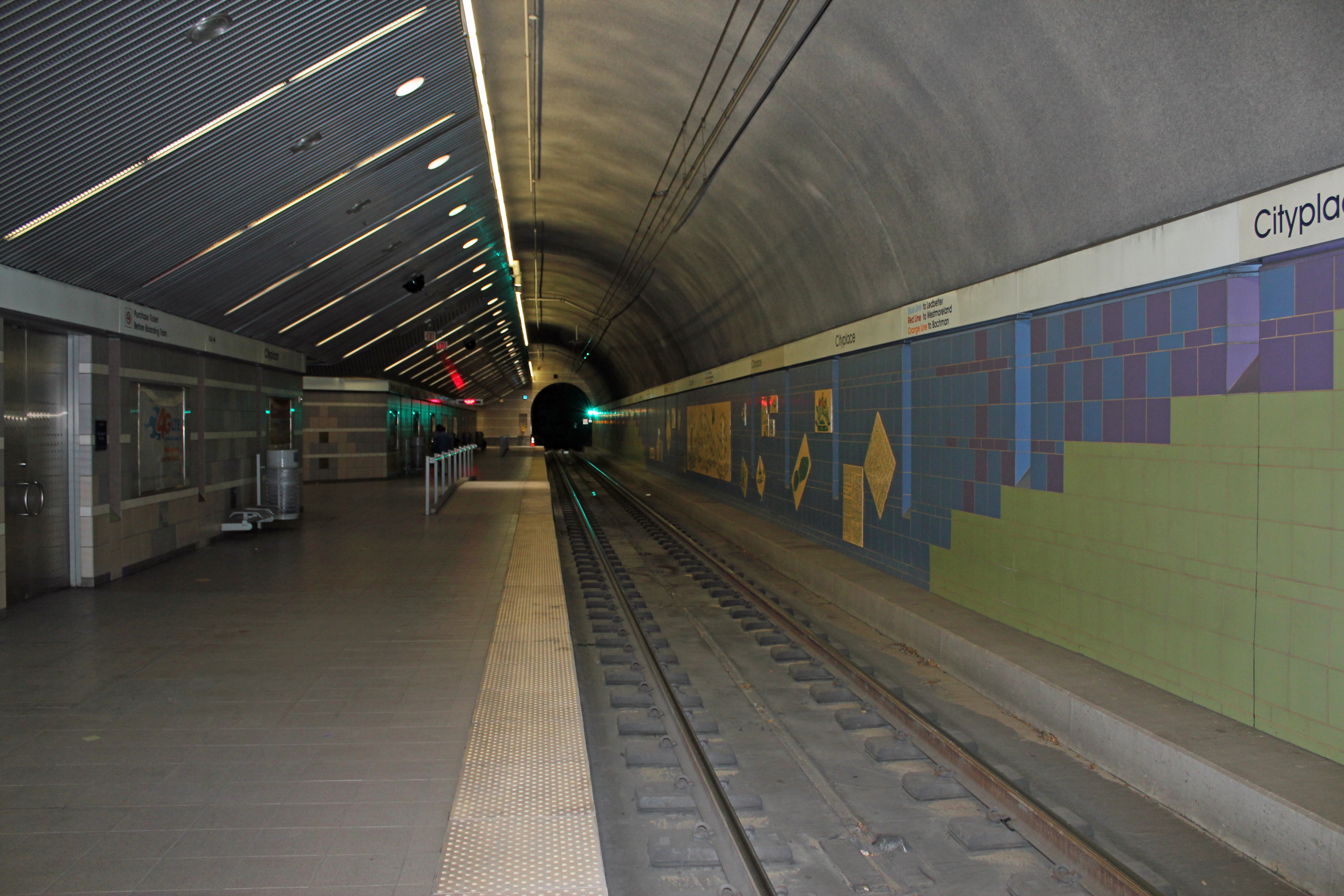
- The inbound platform at Cityplace/Uptown station

General information
- Location: 2711 North Haskell Avenue; Dallas, Texas
- Coordinates: 32°48′20″N 96°47′35″W
- System: DART rail
- Owner: Dallas Area Rapid Transit
- Platforms: 1 island platform
- Tracks: 2
- Bus stands: 3
- Connections: M-Line Trolley; DART: 23, 237

Construction
- Structure type: Underground
- Cycle facilities: 1 locker, 1 rack
- Accessible: Yes

History
- Opened: December 18, 2000
- Former names: Cityplace

Passengers
- FY 2025: 1,345 (avg. weekday) ▼6.7%

Services
Preceding station	DART	Following station
Pearl/Arts District toward UNT Dallas	Blue Line	SMU/Mockingbird toward Downtown Rowlett
Pearl/Arts District toward DFW Airport Terminal A	Orange Line	SMU/Mockingbird toward LBJ/Central or Parker Road
Pearl/Arts District toward Westmoreland	Red Line	SMU/Mockingbird toward Parker Road
Location

Cityplace/Uptown station (formerly Cityplace station) is a DART rail station located in Dallas, Texas. The station is located on the Red Line, Blue Line, Orange Line and serves the Cityplace and Uptown districts. It also serves as a transfer point to the M-Line Trolley.

The station is located beneath North Central Expressway (US 75) at its intersection with Haskell Avenue, and it is located on a 3.5-mile (5.6 km) tunnel connecting Downtown Dallas to SMU/Mockingbird station. The station is the only underground station on the DART rail system, (Note: DART's D2 Subway project would add three more underground stations to the system, but it has been delayed indefinitely.) as well as the only active underground rail station in the state of Texas. (Note: The only other underground station in Texas history was the terminal of the Tandy Center Subway in Fort Worth, which operated from 1963 to 2002.)

== Station ==
Cityplace/Uptown station is tri-level in design. At ground level, the station has entrances (dubbed "portals") on both sides of North Central Expressway. Both portals have a corresponding bus stop located on the expressway's frontage road. The West Portal, located in Uptown's West Village, consists of a small headhouse and a railway turntable, which is used as a stop for the M-Line Trolley. The East Portal is located on the ground floor of Cityplace Tower. Both portals lead a central mezzanine containing an information desk and ticket vending machines. From there, another set of escalators lead to the southern end of the rail platforms.

Early plans for the station called for an additional set of entrances to the north of Haskell Avenue, which would connect to the northern end of the rail platforms.

In total, the station extends 120 feet (37 m) beneath ground level. The station contains two inclined elevators, six escalators, and 213 total steps. The station's longest escalators are 138 feet (42 m), which made them the longest escalators in the western U.S. at installation.

=== Artwork ===
The station contains an "evolution-themed design" based on geological strata, with each of the station's three levels representing a different time period. The stations contains etchings of children's drawings, depictions of Native American artifacts discovered during its excavation, and five Native American-styled murals. The walls of the rail platforms depict local fossils, artifacts from the nearby Freedman's Cemetery, and the Texas Electric Railway system that previously connected Dallas to Denison.

== History ==
In late 1983, developer Southland Corporation announced plans for Cityplace, a 130-acre (0.53 km^{2}) mixed-use project, the centerpiece of which would be two office towers connected by a pedestrian bridge. As the project's site was located along a proposed rail transit corridor, the developer proposed adding a passenger station on this corridor to the pedestrian bridge. In 1985, the Dallas City Council endorsed a revised plan that moved the rail corridor to an underground tunnel between Mockingbird Lane and downtown; the planned Cityplace station was moved underground to accommodate this change.

In 1988, Cityplace leadership offered to pay for up to $22 million of the station's cost if it was located at Haskell Avenue near the north end of the development, but local residents proposed an alternate location on Lemmon Avenue that was closer to existing housing. At the same time, Cityplace was also attempting to rezone its land for denser development, which was also opposed by residents. An investigation by The Dallas Morning News found secret negotiations between DART, Cityplace, and the Dallas municipal government that would make the rezoning contingent on Cityplace paying for the station (as well as road and utility improvements), which was viewed as illegal contract zoning. After the investigation, DART ultimately settled on a compromise site between Haskell and Lemmon, which caused Cityplace to retract its payment offer.

In 1991, DART announced plans to begin excavating the underground tunnel that would contain Cityplace station. The excavation would be completed by 1993. However, it was also announced that the Cityplace station would not open until 1999 for financial reasons; completing the station after excavation would cost $13.7 million. In 1996, as part of a settlement with the city, Cityplace agreed to pay $3.5 million to finance the station, which the city would reimburse through a tax increment financing district. The station was opened on December 18, 2000.

In early 2001, the McKinney Avenue Transit Authority (MATA) received a $2.5 million grant to extend its heritage streetcar line to Cityplace station. The 1.25-mile (2.01 km) extension opened the following year. In 2011, MATA constructed a turntable at the entrance to Cityplace, and DART rebuilt the West Portal headhouse so that the entrance points to the turntable.

On July 30, 2012, the station was renamed to Cityplace/Uptown station to emphasize its connection to the Uptown neighborhood.
