= West Village, Dallas =

Human settlement in Texas, United States

West Village
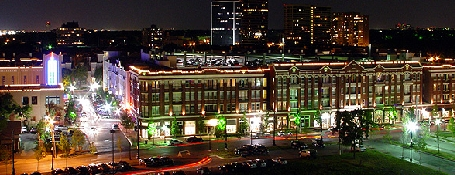
- West Village at night
- Interactive map of West Village
- Location: Uptown, Dallas
- Address: 3699 McKinney Ave, Dallas, Texas
- Coordinates: 32.80849°N 96.79619°W
- Status: Completed
- Estimated completion: 2001
- Use: Mixed-use (retail, residential, office, hotel)
- Website: www.westvil.com

Technical details
- Leasable area: 484,000 square feet (45,000 m^{2})

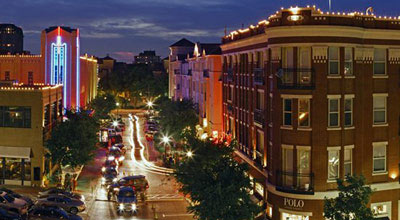

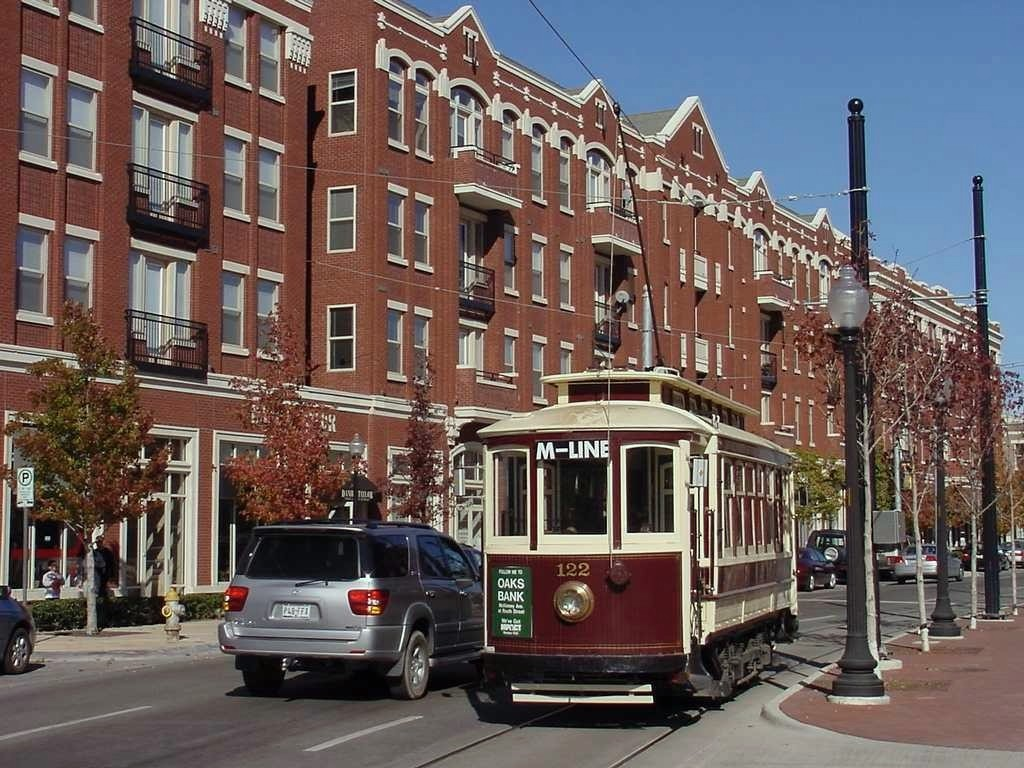
M-Line Trolley Car #122 on Cole Avenue.

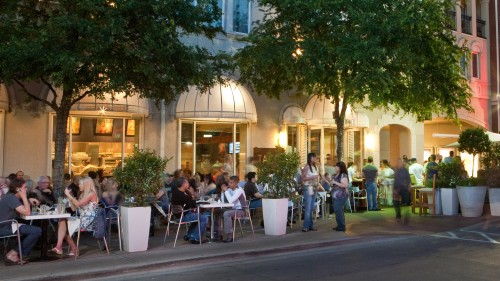

The West Village District is a walkable urban village in the Uptown area of Dallas, Texas. West Village is located at the northern edge of Uptown along McKinney Avenue and is bordered by Lemmon Avenue, Cole Avenue, Blackburn Street and Central Expressway.

West Village proper has 88 retail, restaurant and entertainment tenants within 244,000 square feet (22,700 m^{2}) and contains approximately 4,500 residential units. It also contains a 240,000 square feet (22,000 m^{2}) office building that previously served as the headquarters of The Richards Group.

== History ==
West Village, opened in 2001, was built on an undeveloped assembly that was cleared in the 1980s for a large, master-planned urban community to be known as CityPlace. West Village was developed by Urban Partners, Henry S. Miller Interests, Phoenix Property Company, and The CityPlace Company.

The original development, designed by Washington architect David M. Schwarz, is a mixed-use development with the retail portion managed by Urban Partners and the residential component managed by CIM. West Village has continues to stimulate development attracting tens of thousands of residents living in urban apartment homes.

== Transportation ==
West Village is two miles (3.2 km) north of Downtown Dallas. The Katy Trail, a noted Dallas running and biking corridor, is within a block of the development.

=== Light Rail ===
- DART: Red Line, Orange Line and Blue Line connects Cityplace with downtown retail, businesses, museums, and other interesting attractions like the Dallas Federal Reserve Bank.
  - Cityplace/Uptown Station

=== Streetcars ===
- MATA: M-Line Trolley

The M-Line Trolley is a heritage streetcar that provides service between Cityplace/Uptown station in Uptown and St Paul station in Downtown. Riding the historical streetcars is free and provides a great way to tour this area of Dallas.
The M-Line features 40 dedicated stops serving key destinations including: West Village, the McKinney Avenue retail and business corridor, Klyde Warren Park, the Dallas Arts District, four historical cemeteries, and the State Thomas historic neighborhood.
