= Murder of Santos Rodriguez =

1973 police murder in Dallas, Texas, US

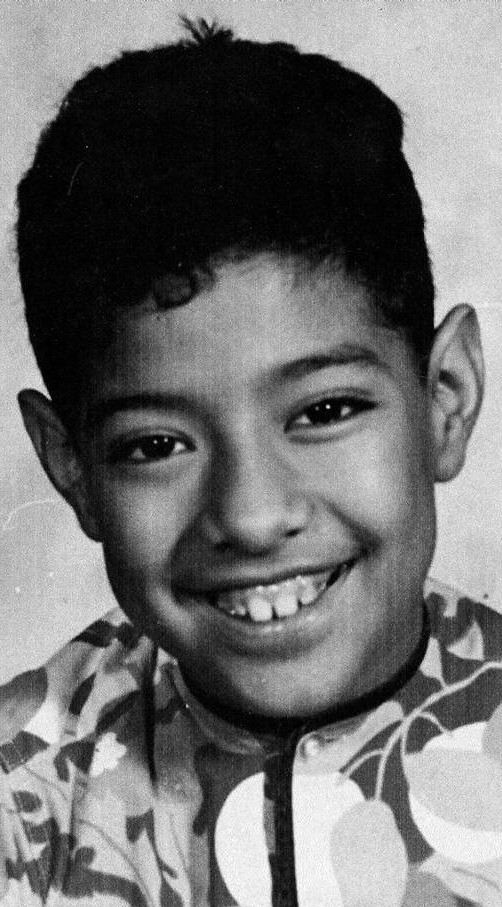
- Undated photo of Santos Rodriguez
- Location: Dallas, Texas, U.S.
- Date: July 24, 1973; 53 years ago
- Attack type: Child murder by shooting, child abduction, police killing
- Victims: Santos Rodriguez, aged 12
- Perpetrator: Darrell Lee Cain
- Motive: Attempt to extort false confession
- Verdict: Guilty
- Convictions: Murder with malice
- Sentence: 5 years in prison, paroled after 2 1/2 years

On the morning of July 24, 1973, in Dallas, Texas, United States, 30-year-old Dallas police officer Darrell Lee Cain murdered Santos Rodriguez, a 12-year-old Mexican-American child. Officer Cain and Officer Roy R. Arnold were investigating reports of a burglary at a Fina gas station when they took Santos Rodriguez and his 13-year-old brother David Rodriguez from their home for an impromptu interrogation over the burglary. Cain shot Santos Rodriguez while conducting Russian roulette on the brothers in an attempt to force a confession from them.

Cain was found guilty of murder with malice, and was sentenced to the minimum five years in prison. He was released on September 11, 1979, after serving the minimum two-and-a-half-year sentence.

== Parties involved ==
=== Santos Rodriguez ===
Santos Rodriguez was born on November 7, 1960, and was the child of Bessie Garcia and David Rodriguez. He was reported to have been 5 ft 10 in (178 cm) tall. At the time of his death, Santos and his brother lived with an adoptive grandfather, 84-year-old Carlos Minez, at 2921 N. Pearl St. in the Little Mexico neighborhood of Dallas. Their mother, Bessie, was serving a five-year sentence in the Goree women's unit of Huntsville State Prison. She had been convicted for the April 26, 1971 killing of 62-year-old Leonard Brown, her boyfriend. Santos and his brother, David, were placed in the home of Minez, who had helped care for Bessie during her childhood, at their mother's request after her conviction. The three youngest Rodriguez siblings, Ruben, Robert, and Juanita, were placed in foster homes.

Santos was a student at William B. Travis Elementary School at 3001 McKinney Ave. Santos and his brother, David, had previous run-ins with the law over shoplifting and truancy, and Santos was described by his teachers as naive and easily influenced, deep thinking, gentle and a fan of classical music. Teachers would also report to The Dallas Morning News that they "kept feeling all along that something was going to happen to those boys". Supervisors at the Pike Park Community Center where Santos played described him as someone who was willing to volunteer to help clean the park and community center. Santos played soccer at Pike Park, and friends described how he played as a starter and could kick a soccer ball halfway down a field. His mother reported that he enjoyed listening to the band Santana, and loved eating enchiladas and hotdogs.

=== David Rodriguez ===
David Rodriguez was Santos's older brother. He was also a student at William B. Travis Elementary at the time of Santos's death. David was in the police car with his brother when Santos was shot, and witnessed his death. David currently lives in Dallas, Texas.

=== Darrell L. Cain ===
Darrell Lee Cain, 30, had worked at the Dallas Police Department for five years when he committed the murder of Santos. He was born in Benkelman, Nebraska, on March 31, 1943. He died on March 17, 2019. He was married in 1964, and had one son at the time of the murder. He served in the Army from 1962 to 1965, and was honorably discharged with the rank of Spec 4.

Cain had been previously involved in the controversial death of 18-year-old Michael Morehead (also spelled Michael Moorhead) on April 20, 1970. At around 3:10 AM, Cain and another officer, Jeffery L. Kirksey, were investigating a silent burglar alarm that had been set off at the Empire Bar & Grill at 3307 Munger Ave. They found Morehead and a relative burgling the restaurant. Morehead and his 26-year-old relative fled the scene, but Morehead was shot three times as he fled, leading to his death. In total, Cain had fired five shots and Kirksey fired eight. Morehead's grandmother produced recorded statements from witnesses claiming that Morehead had been shot while he was on the ground, and that he had begged the officers not to shoot him. While witnesses to the shooting later changed their statements following questioning by the FBI, investigations of the shooting revealed that the officers had shot into the grassy field where Morehead lay. No charges were ever brought against Cain or Kirksey, but they were moved to another patrol area in part due to public pressure and protests. Michael Morehead was the son of George Morehead and Carrie Young. He lived at 2123 Johnson Place, and was buried in Glen Oak Memorial Cemetery in Dallas. Later that year, Cain shot and wounded a man in a Dallas city park.

=== Roy R. Arnold ===
Roy Arnold, 23, was a three-year veteran of the Dallas Police Department at the time of Santos's death. His father was police sergeant Horace "Hap" Arnold. Arnold was not charged in the Santos Rodriguez murder case. On August 3, 1973, he was dismissed from the Dallas Police force for failure to file a full report of the night of the shooting. A resident of the neighborhood where the murder occurred reported to the Dallas Police on August 2, 1973, that they had heard a gunshot from the area before the shooting of Santos. Further investigation revealed that Cain and Arnold had witnessed two youths breaking and entering the Fina gas station and that Arnold had fired one shot towards the suspects in an attempt to warn them from fleeing. The suspects escaped, and Arnold failed to report firing a warning shot. Questions arose during the murder investigation regarding whether or not Arnold had enough time to intervene in the Russian roulette interrogation held by Cain, or whether Arnold could have acted to prevent Santos's death.

== Background ==
Santos Rodriguez lived in the Little Mexico neighborhood, a historically Mexican-American neighborhood that was built in part due to immigration patterns and segregation practices in Dallas. By the 1950s, Mexican-American and students of Hispanic and Latino origin could attend one of four segregated elementary schools: William B. Travis, Cumberland Hills, Benito Juarez, and City Park. Crozier Tech High School served as the segregated high school for the Mexican-American communities of Dallas. By 1970, Mexican Americans made up around 8% of the city's population, or around 40,000 people. While early Mexican-American organizations tried to assimilate into Anglo Dallas society, Mexican-American students still faced segregated schools that lacked resources compared to Anglo schools, as well as structural racism. The first Mexican-American City Council member, Anita Martinez, was elected in 1969, and at the time of the murder Pedro Aguirre served on the City Council. This time period was also marked by the rise of the Chicano movement, which had begun its development in the mid 1960s with the grape strikes of California and developed into a national Civil Rights movement.

== Murder ==
Police records noted a burglary call on Tuesday, July 24, 1973, at 2:10 AM at a Fina gas station located at 2301 Cedar Springs in Dallas. There are conflicting reports on how and when Cain and Arnold arrived at the scene of the burglary. An article from the Dallas Times Herald stated that Cain and Arnold reported to the Fina gas station after receiving information from police dispatch that there was a robbery in progress, and that the suspect(s) had fled by the time police arrived. In contrast, Arnold was dismissed from the Police force in August 1973 for failing to report firing a warning shot at a suspect fleeing the gas station, indicating that the officers arrived at the robbery and witnessed the suspects as they fled or that Arnold fired upon a civilian in the area. According to The Dallas Morning News, Arnold reported that he believed the suspects were David and Santos Rodriguez. Cain and Arnold went to the home where the Rodriguez brothers were living and took them into custody at around 2:30 AM. There was no warrant issued, but the officers claimed they had received permission from their guardian, Carlos Minez. Minez reportedly spoke rudimentary English, and there is no record that either officer spoke Spanish.

David and Santos were handcuffed and put into Arnold's police car without being given time to change their clothes or put on shoes, and were taken to the gas station for an impromptu interrogation. The vehicle was parked in a vacant lot behind the gas station with Arnold in the driver's seat, Cain in the seat behind Arnold, Santos in the passenger seat, and David seated behind him. Arnold questioned the boys about the burglary, but neither would confess to committing the crime. Much of the questioning was towards Santos. Cain later testified that after the boys denied criminal involvement he told Arnold that he would make the boys talk, and Cain took his .357 Magnum revolver and removed the bullets in a way that the removed bullets would make a noise as they hit together. Cain claimed he visually checked the cylinder and did not see any bullets left in his gun. Cain took his gun and aimed it at Santos, warning the boy to tell him the truth about the burglary. Santos refused to confess, and Cain pulled the trigger, clicking an empty chamber. Cain again threatened to shoot Santos if he did not confess, and according to later testimony by Cain, Santos's last words were "I am telling the truth." Cain pulled the trigger again at Santos, and this time the gun fired. The bullet struck below Santos's left ear, penetrating his brain and causing his death instantly. Cain and Arnold quickly exited the car, leaving David, who was still handcuffed and unable to exit the vehicle, alone with Santos's body. David told his brother “You are going to be alright” as blood began to seep onto David's feet. David would be left in the vehicle with his brother for around 10 minutes, still handcuffed.

Dallas Police Officer Jerry Foster was also at the scene at the time of Santos's killing. Foster was on patrol when he responded to a police broadcast reporting the burglary at the gas station. He investigated the scene and found that a desk drawer was open in the station, a rear window was broken out, and a cigarette machine had been pried open. Foster witnessed the arrival of Cain, Arnold, and the Rodriguez brothers in Arnold's car. Foster reported that he yelled out to Arnold that he had received information that a third individual was suspected in the burglary. Foster approached Arnold's car and laid his arm on the car door when he heard the shooting of Santos. Foster saw Santos's head slump over and saw blood coming from Santos's head. Foster heard Cain scream before Cain quickly exited the vehicle and stated: "My God, My God, What have I done, I didn't mean to do it." Arnold also left the vehicle and vomited. Moments after Cain exited the vehicle, Foster took Cain's gun from him. Five live rounds and one empty cartridge were in the gun. Officer David Rowe, who was also on patrol that morning, responded to a radio call about a boy being accidentally shot. Rowe arrived at the scene minutes after hearing the radio call, and saw that both Rodriguez brothers were still handcuffed and in the police car, with Santos in the front seat "all bloody". Officer Rowe would later attend Santos's funeral. Santos's pulse was checked and an ambulance was called. Santos was pronounced dead on arrival at Parkland Hospital.

== Aftermath and responses ==
Carlos Minez, Santos's and David's foster grandfather, was notified by Dallas Police of Santos's death by being asked to identify a body. Within hours of the shooting, Cain was suspended from the police force. Dallas Police Chief Frank Dyson filed charges of murder with malice against Cain the same morning of the shooting. A bond of $5,000.00 was set by Municipal Court Judge Frances Goodwin for Cain, and Cain was released Tuesday afternoon after his attorney Phil Burleson posted his bond. Chief Dyson expressed his disappointment at the bond price, and Judge Goodwin later refused to comment on her bond setting when pressed by the Mexican-American community. By July 26, two days after the shooting, the investigation of the Cedar Springs burglary proved that neither of the brother's fingerprints matched any at the scene of the crime. On Tuesday activist Rene Martinez helped organize a community meeting at Pike Park in order to coordinate a protest for Saturday, July 28. Speakers at the Pike Park meeting and attendees, who included leaders such as Pancho Medrano, spoke out against both the shooting and the low bail set for Cain.

On Wednesday, July 25, a funeral announcement was listed for Santos in The Dallas Morning News. The announcement listed his surviving relatives and details of his funeral: the service would be held on Thursday, July 26, at 2:00 pm at the First Mexican Baptist Church, and would be officiated by Rev. Rudy Sanchez. Bessie Rodriguez arrived in Dallas on Wednesday on a three-day reprieve from her prison sentence to attend her son's funeral. On Wednesday night she attended a memorial service at Temple Emanu-El Methodist Church. District Attorney Henry Wade announced that same Wednesday that murder charges against Cain would be taken to the Dallas County grand jury once the Dallas Police completed their investigation. Wade met with Minez and Rev. Sanchez and explained the procedure and legal steps in a murder case to the men, and in turn Wade felt that the community wanted him and his top assistant Doug Mulder to handle the case as they had previously handled the kidnapping case of Amanda M. Dealey, the daughter-in-law of Dallas Morning News president Joe M. Dealey.

Over 600 people attended Santos's funeral on Thursday. Attendees included Civil Rights leaders Rene Martinez and Al Lipscomb, who criticized the absence of Dallas Police Chief Frank Dyson. In his defense, Dyson claimed that he was told by Rev. Sanchez that police officers should not be in attendance, and contemporary accounts note that fellow officers expressed anger over the shooting of Santos. Santos lay in a silver casket. Rev. Rudy Sanchez led the service and noted that Minez had been a founder of the First Mexican-American Baptist Church, and that Santos and David had converted to Christianity a few months before Santos's death. Rev. Sanchez called for forgiveness and justice, and for the community to do more for children like the Rodriguez brothers. Six pallbearers, friends of Santos, carried Santos's casket to a hearse outside of the church. Around 200 mourners followed the funeral procession to Oakland Cemetery, where a short burial service was held. Santos's headstone lists his name, dates of birth and death, and the words "From his mother".

Upon the recommendation of District Attorney Wade, Justice of the Peace Tom Naylor raised Cain's bond to $50,000.00 on Thursday, July 27, and issued a warrant for Cain's arrest. Judge Naylor reported to The Dallas Morning News that he felt the higher bond was more appropriate. On that same day District Attorney Wade and his assistant Doug Mulder presented murder charges against Cain to the grand jury. Several members of the Dallas Police Department were in the grand jury room during the proceedings, including Roy Arnold, the director of the Dallas Police internal affairs division R. O. Dixon, and Lt. T. L. Baker of the crimes against persons division. At this time DPD internal affairs was continuing their investigation of Arnold. Wade met with David and Bessie Rodriguez and two other women on the day of the grand jury hearing, and while he made no official commentary on that meeting, Wade did assure news outlets that affidavits had been presented to the grand jury. Cain surrendered himself at the Dallas County jail that same evening, at around 7:30 pm. During this time a City Council committee temporarily removed the bond-setting powers of municipal court judges in felony cases that involve city employees as a response to the original $5,000.00 bond set for Cain. The three member committee was headed by Mayor Pro Tem George Allen, and had been advised by City Attorney Alex Bickley that a bond was not a punishment for a defendant but rather was a means of ensuring their appearance in court. Nevertheless, the committee saw the low bond as concerning and too low for the seriousness of the case, with the exception of committee member City Councilman Russell Smith.

Rev. Rudy Sanchez established a committee of Mexican-American leaders in response to the shooting, and the committee created a list of demands regarding Santos's killing and community concerns regarding mistreatment of minority groups by Dallas police. The committee had a closed meeting with Chief Dyson at the Dallas Public Library on July 26, and afterwards made their demands before a panel of city councilmen and city officials. Their demands included an investigation into why Cain was given a low bond, how and why Dallas Police gave confidential juvenile files to the media, and investigation into every stage of Santos's and David's arrest. Councilman Pedro Aguirre called for more information about Arnold's actions during the shooting, and Councilman Garry Weber assured the Mexican-American community that they had the full support of the City Council. A meeting between the Mexican-American committee and city officials was set for Saturday, July 28, at 9:00 am by city manager George Schrader.

On Friday, July 27, Cain was indicted by the grand jury and charged that he "did voluntarily and with malice aforethought kill" Santos. The case was set to appear before District Judge Ed Gossett. By the time of the indictment, the Mercantile National Bank established a Santos Rodriguez fund in order to pay for funeral expenses and future expenses of the Rodriguez siblings, and representatives from the Southern Christian Leadership Conference (SCLC) and the Brown Berets held a joint meeting demanding that Arnold also be charged in the shooting.

Attending the Saturday meeting with Chief Dyson and City Manager Schrader were Rev. Rudy Sanchez, Rene Martinez of the Tri-Ethnic committee, Dallas attorney Florentino Ramirez, West Dallas worker Pete Martinez, and members of the Brown Berets, representing the Mexican-American community. City Council members Pedro Aguirre, Garry Weber, Russell Smith, and Adlene Harrison represented the City of Dallas at the meeting. Chief Dyson acknowledged that there were Dallas Police officers who exhibited racial bias when performing their duties, biases he termed "dual standards", and promised to do whatever possible to eliminate them. He did not respond to questions regarding the case against Cain, citing concerns over jeopardizing future criminal proceedings against Cain. Dyson claimed that new policies were being enacted to address racial biases in police officers, including giving psychological tests to determine the attitudes of officers accused of racial discrimination. He also noted that while it was up to the officer's discretion to handcuff suspects, it was not within protocol to take suspects to the scene of a crime. He also reaffirmed that the police records of the Rodriguez brothers should not have been given out to the press. Schrader told the committee that "what occurred on that morning was wrong in every sense."

== March ==
A march, held on July 28 and called the "March of Justice for Santos Rodriguez", was led by community leaders and organizations, including Rev. Sanchez, Councilman Pete Aguirre, Rene Martinez, Florentino Ramirez, State Representative Sam Hudson, and members of the Brown Berets. Marchers were predominantly of Mexican-American and African-American descent. The organization of the march, according to City Councilman George Allen, had the full backing of the city. The march began at Kennedy Plaza at around 12:00 pm, and led through Main Street to Dallas City Hall which was then located at 106 S. Harwood St. Speeches were made at the steps of City Hall calling for community unity and action, and at around 12:50 pm the march led back to Kennedy Plaza. Prayers were held at the plaza and the original organized march was dispersed.

Afterwards, groups broke off from the march and latecomers joined the groups as they headed back towards City Hall. The crowd became agitated, and stores such as Neiman-Marcus, Titche's, Zales, Woolf Brothers, Jas. K. Wilson, Everts Jewelers, and H. L. Green's reported damages to storefronts and looting. At City Hall, leaders of the original march such as Councilman Aguirre and Representative Hudson got on top of a Dallas Police car and used the speaker system in an attempt to get the crowd under control. Dallas Police vehicles were damaged by the crowd, and a motorcycle was burned. Police officers experienced some physical attacks, with five officers injured, but there were no serious injuries. Officers in gas masks and armed with clubs confronted the crowd, and the crowd dispersed as some of its members damaged nearby stores. Leaders of the march later expressed dismay over the chaotic situation, but applauded the purpose of the march and its original organization. The Monday after the march, the Mexican-American committee led by Rev. Sanchez met with the city council to discuss the case and methods of confronting the treatment of minority groups by police. A special committee composed of eleven members was formed by the Greater Dallas Community Relations Committee in order to continue investigation and questioning of the events and circumstances surrounding Santos's shooting. The Rodriguez family later issued a statement regarding the march:

The Rodriguez family would only ask that when the people of Dallas hear the name Santos Rodriguez they think not of the unwanted violence that became associated with his name Saturday; but they think of the real Santos Rodriguez, a gentle and well-liked 12-year-old boy who had his life tragically taken from him.

== Trial ==
On Thursday, October 11, 1973, a hearing was held in the Criminal Court No. 5 for a venue change for Cain's trial. District Attorney Mulder and Cain's attorney Phil Burleson asked for the trial to be moved outside of Dallas County out of concerns that it would be difficult to hold a fair trial in Dallas and surrounding counties due to the publicity of the shooting. Judge Ed Gossett considered moving the case to either Wichita Falls or Austin. Mulder objected to Wichita Falls due to the recent disbarment of the city's District Attorney, and Burleson objected to Travis County due to Austin receiving Dallas news stations and newspapers. Judge Gossett ultimately moved the trial to the 147th District Court of Austin, with the hearing set for November 12, 1973. Judge Gossett stayed on as presiding judge in the case in Austin. He also set a lower bond of $20,000.00 for Cain, which Cain paid on Friday, October 12, and was released. Until that point Cain was still in jail for the shooting. When asked about why he gave Cain a lower bond, Gossett responded that the bond was not a punishment, but rather served to ensure that a prisoner would appear in court. Attorneys for Cain filed 26 pre-trial motions, and included a motion for quashing Cain's indictment due to insufficient evidence, claims that the evidence presented to the grand jury was hearsay, quashing the indictment due to vagueness, requests for criminal records of the victims, recordings of police radio transmissions, requests for statements to police, and other motions typical for a trial. By November 2, Judge Gossett denied the motions to quash the indictments against Cain. At a seminar for trial techniques for defense attorneys held in Fort Worth, Burleson announced that the defense for Cain planned on taking the position that the shooting was accidental, and that Burleson would place Cain on the witness stand to give his view of the event.

Cain was represented by Phil Burleson and Michael P. Gibson. The State of Texas was represented by DA Henry Wade, W. T. Westmoreland, Jr., Assistant DAs Doug Mulder and Jon Sparling, DA Robert O. Smith, Assistant DA Herman C. Gotcher, State's Attorney Jim D. Vollers, and State's Attorney David S. McAngus.

A jury was chosen for the trial on Monday, November 12. The jury was composed of seven men and five women, and did not have any jurors who were Mexican-American or African-American. During the questioning portion of jury selection, Sparling explained that Texas law recognized two types of murder: murder with malice and murder without malice, and that malice could be formed moments before a murder is committed. In response, Burleson claimed that the events before the shooting would prove that the shooting was an accident. Motion hearings were also held that Monday. Burleson had presented a motion for continuance in choosing jurors, citing concerns over potential jurors becoming influenced by a small contingent of protesters outside of the courthouse, but Judge Gossett denied the motion. Judge Gossett ruled that the criminal histories and reputations of Santos, David, and Bessie Rodriguez were inadmissible in court and that witness descriptions of the shooting were admissible. In response to demonstrators who had gathered at the courthouse (numbering between two and ten), Travis County Sheriff Raymond Frank assigned fifteen to twenty deputies around the courtroom.

On Tuesday, November 13, the prosecution brought five witnesses to the stand: David Rodriguez, patrolman Jerry W. Foster, ballistics expert Allan Jones, Officer Fred M. Jenkins, and Associate Medical Examiner Vincent DiMaio. David was the first witness to give his testimony of the day of the murder. At the beginning of his testimony, David detailed how he and Santos spent the evening of July 23 playing football. David claimed that he arrived home and went to bed around 10:00 pm, hearing Santos arrive around 15 minutes afterwards. David fell asleep and awoke to Officers Cain and Arnold taking the boys from their bed and putting them under arrest. David and Santos were handcuffed, and David sat in the back seat next to Cain while Santos was placed in the front seat with Arnold. Prior to the shooting, David saw another police car with two officers arriving at the scene. David and Santos were interrogated, and Santos claimed that they were innocent. David saw Cain pull out his gun, hold it in his lap, open and twirl the cylinder before closing it, and point the gun at Santos. The first time Cain pulled the trigger it made a clicking sound. According to David, Cain told Santos that the gun had a bullet in it this time, and that Santos had better tell Arnold the truth. Santos again claimed his innocence, and the second time Cain pulled the trigger Santos was shot and killed. After Santos was shot, David said he watched Cain out of fear that Cain would shoot him next, and that he did not see Cain touch the cylinder of the gun before Cain left the car. On cross examination, Burleson asked if Cain had emptied the bullets from his gun, and David responded that Cain did not. David previously had stated that officers left him in the car with Santos's body for around 10 minutes.

Patrolman Jerry Foster was the second witness. Foster corroborated David's statement about two other officers arriving at the scene before the shooting: Foster stated that he and his partner Thomas McKee were the officers David saw that morning. Foster also stated that he was at the driver's door of the car where David and Santos were sitting when he heard a gunshot and saw the front of the vehicle light up. He then stated that he saw Santos's head fall back, and saw bleeding coming from the left side of Santos's head. He went over to the side of the car where Santos was to try to help him, and saw Cain getting out of the car. Foster went to Cain and took Cain's pistol from him, and did not see Cain touch the cylinder of the gun after leaving the vehicle. When Foster unloaded Cain's gun, he saw five live rounds and one hull in the cylinder. Foster also saw Arnold leave the vehicle and vomit. On cross examination, Foster elaborated that, after leaving the vehicle, Cain repeatedly said "My God, what have I done. I didn't mean to do it...Jerry [Foster], I didn't mean to do it." In Foster's opinion, Cain seemed to be in shock.

The third witness was ballistics expert Allan Jones. Jones testified that Santos had been shot from a distance of about six inches. Jones had examined the bullets and saw that none of them had been struck by a firing pin. According to Jones, the .357 Magnum pistol was designed to fire only when the trigger was fully pulled back, but could be made to make a clicking noise using two different methods. The fourth witness was Officer Fred M. Jenkins, who investigated the scene of the burglary and took several hand and finger prints from the machine that had been broken into. The prints were compared by four different officers to the prints of Santos, David, and a cousin of theirs who had also become a suspect, and nothing was found to associate David or Santos to the scene of the crime. The fifth and final witness was Dr. Vincent DiMaio, who conducted Santos's autopsy. Dr. DiMaio confirmed that Santos was killed by a gunshot wound to his head and brain, and that he had removed the bullet from Santos and given it to Jones, who examined the bullet and confirmed that it came from Cain's gun. After the testimonies of the five witnesses, the state rested its case.

On Wednesday, November 14, Darrell Cain gave his testimony in his own defense. Cain claimed that he and Arnold found the Rodriguez brothers in their bed, and that they looked sweaty. Arnold told Cain that the brothers were the ones he saw running from the gas station. Cain and Arnold put the boys in handcuffs behind their backs and took them to a parking lot behind the burglarized gas station. Cain recalled that he and Arnold met officers Foster and McKee and that Arnold claimed there may have been a third burglar. According to Cain, when Arnold asked Santos if the boys had another brother, Santos affirmed that they did but that he did not know where his other brother was. Cain told Arnold that he would "make him [Santos] tell the truth", and took his pistol between his legs, emptied it, and visually checked that there were no bullets in the gun before closing the gun's chamber. Cain then pointed the gun at Santos and pulled the trigger, making a clicking sound. He warned Santos to tell the truth, and that there was a bullet in the gun. The second time Cain pulled the trigger, a shot fired, killing Santos. Cain described how he grabbed the bullets from his lap, jumped from the car, and put the bullets back into the gun while he was out of the vehicle. Cain said he was in shock and hysterical, and that he cried over what had happened. Mulder cross-examined Cain and asked if it was within normal police procedure to interrogate a young boy using a gun. Cain responded that it was not. Mulder asked Cain what made him set himself up as a judge of truth, and Cain responded that he did not know. Mulder had Cain reenact the incident in front of the jury. In response to Cain's previous claims that he had pressed his gun's ejector rod to empty it of bullets, Mulder demonstrated that the bullets would fall out of the gun if it were merely tilted. Mulder loaded and unloaded the gun by turning the cylinder upside down several times. Mulder questioned Cain about his claim that he reloaded the pistol, stating that Foster claimed he did not see Cain reload his gun outside of the car. Cain responded that he did indeed reload his gun, but that in the confusion nobody saw him. Mulder asked Cain what Santos's last words were, and Cain responded that they were "I am telling the truth."

Roy Arnold was called as a witness to the defense. Arnold claimed that the Rodriguez brothers were the boys he saw fleeing the gas station, and that while he did not witness Cain removing the bullets from his gun, he did hear noises that could have been bullets falling from a chamber, but that he did not truly know. He also claimed that he saw the hammer of the gun fall the first time Cain made the pistol make a clicking noise, but did not see if Cain pulled the trigger during the first round. During cross examination, Arnold claimed that he saw Santos fleeing the gas station and was wearing dark pants and a T-shirt. Arnold admitted that Santos was wearing light green pants when he was killed, and when Arnold was asked by Mulder how he reconciled the fact that Santos was dressed differently than Arnold claimed, Arnold admitted that he could not. The final defense witness was Travis County Deputy Sheriff Tommy Tucker. Tucker demonstrated how, if the ejector rod was used to empty the gun, two bullets could be caught in the chamber. Mulder responded, "Where did they find you?" and again demonstrated that the bullets would freely fall out of the chamber if the gun was tilted up.

One testimony was disallowed from the trial. Dallas Psychiatrist Dr. John Holbrook testified to the judge without the presence of the jury that he had given Cain a truth serum, sodium amytal, two days after the shooting while Cain was given a lie detector test by trained polygrapher Ray Jones. According to Holbrook, Cain testified under the influence of this drug that he believed the gun was empty when he pointed it at Santos. Holbrook qualified his testimony by stating that the "truth serum" influenced Cain to tell the truth as Cain knew it to be. Judge Gossett stated that prior appellate court decisions barred the use of lie detector tests as court evidence, and that testimony given while under the influence of "truth serums" fell under the same category. Gossett also barred the media from reporting on the use of a "truth serum" during the time the case was before a jury.

Final arguments were held on Thursday, November 15. DA Jon Sparling opened the final arguments, and described Arnold and Cain as "storm troopers" who broke into the Rodriguez home and arrested them without a warrant. Sparling stated that the evidence was overwhelming: Cain was guilty of murder. Sparling told the jury that the state's position was that Cain shot Santos deliberately and intentionally. He also reminded the jury that the law did not require the state to give a motivation for the shooting. The bulk of Sparling's argument was focused on Cain's claim that he believed he emptied the gun. Sparling reminded the jury that David testified that he saw Cain spin the cylinder, not open it, and that Foster did not witness Cain reload his gun as Cain claimed. Sparling claimed that Cain was lying to the jury. Burleson spoke in defense of the client, telling the jury that their job was to ascertain the truth, not all become emotionally involved as the prosecution wanted. Burleson claimed the killing was out of poor judgement and stupidity, and that no man would have intentionally killed a child in front of three witnesses. Mulder closed the final arguments. He compared the arrests of the boys to Nazi Germany, and that while Burleson argued that it was a mistake of fact on the part of Cain in that he thought he unloaded his gun, Mulder argued that proper care of a reasonable man had to be exercised for there to be a mistake of fact. It was against the law for Cain to have pointed his gun at Santos, argued Mulder. He stated:

"And I will tell you, the only thing worse than killing a handcuffed child, a 12-year-old child who is handcuffed in a squad car, who had been involved in a burglary from a Fina station, the only thing worse than that...The only thing worse than killing a child who is handcuffed, who is involved in a burglary, is killing a child who was handcuffed who was totally blameless, and totally innocent."

After five and a half hours of deliberation, the jury found Cain guilty of murder or negligent homicide. Whether he was found guilty of murder with malice or guilty of murder without malice was decided during the punishment phase of the trial, which was scheduled for Friday, November 16. Final arguments were opened by Assistant DA Herman Gotcher, who argued for the prosecution's recommended murder with malice sentence. Gotcher argued that, as a police officer, Cain had to be held to a higher degree of responsibility for his actions than a layperson. The defense did not argue directly against a murder with malice sentence, and instead focused the crux of their argument on the need for leniency, probation rather than a prison sentence, due to Cain's time serving as a police officer. Gibson urged the jury to remember that Cain served on the police force for five and a half years and risked his life serving the citizens of Dallas, and that he deserved to rebuild what Gibson described as a shattered and torn life. Burleson argued that Cain would be subject to abuse in prison due to his service as a police officer, and that a prison sentence could be a death sentence for Cain. Sparling closed the arguments by calling for equality under the law, undermining the defense's request for leniency due to Cain's service. Sparling stated:

Now, what would you have us do, really? I mean, what are we to do, are we to look at the defendant over here and focus on him and his look of designed innocence and blind ourselves to the corpse of the boy he killed? If so, who is to answer for the death of Santos Rodriguez? Who? Are we to hear his cries and close our ears to the sobbing, mourning tears of those people that mourn Santos Rodriguez? If so, who is to answer for the death of Santos Rodriguez? Are we to do what Phil Burleson says, are we to wring our hands and shrug our shoulders and nod our heads, say oh, it's a pity, but let's give him probation. If so, then who is to answer for the death of Santos Rodriguez? You? Me? The community at large? I refuse.

After five and a half hours of deliberation, the same time it took to determine guilt, Cain was sentenced to five years in prison for murder with malice. A formal sentencing date was not set on the same day.

Cain was freed on bond pending an appeal of his case. By 1975, he remained suspended from the Dallas Police force and worked outside of Dallas County. His attorney, Phil Burleson, argued that Cain deserved a new trial. By October 1975, the Texas Court of Criminal Appeals still had not received the necessary files for appealing the case. The appeal hearing would determine whether Cain would be able to have a new trial or if he would be required to carry out his five-year sentence. Cain's defense attorneys planned to argue that Judge Gossett should have allowed Cain's "truth serum" test to be brought as testimony and that the prosecution's emotionally-charged attacks damaged Cain's case. In the spring of 1975, Burleson reported that court reporters and clerks were completing the records of the original trial and that the defense intended to request to Judge Gossett that the original trial be set aside. DA Henry Wade planned to oppose the plea. At this time Cain was working in Fort Worth and planned on appealing to the Texas Court of Criminal Appeals if the request for a new trial was denied.

On Wednesday, November 17, 1976, lawyers representing Cain asked for the Court of Criminal Appeals to order a new trial. On Wednesday, March 9, 1977, the Texas Court of Criminal Appeals ruled that Cain had received a fair trial and upheld the five-year sentence he was given. Cain continued to remain free on bond pending an appeal to the court. The case was eventually taken to the United States Supreme Court, and on Monday, October 3, 1977, the court refused to accept the case for review and upheld the murder conviction and five-year sentence. A brief prepared by Cain's defense claimed that the jury did not have sufficient freedom in their ruling, which eased the prosecution's ability to gain a murder conviction. The Texas Attorney General responded to this brief with his own, stating that the jury had been instructed that Cain was only to be found guilty if there was proof beyond a reasonable doubt that Cain voluntarily shot Santos, and to acquit Cain if Cain had acted under the mistaken assumption that the gun was unloaded and that Cain's mistake was due to lack of proper care.

Cain ultimately served two and a half years of his five-year sentence. He served his time at the Texas Department of Corrections facility in Huntsville, Texas. He was classified as a state-approved trusty, which gave him privileged earning status, allowing him to meet his minimum discharge date on September 11, 1979. He had also earned the maximum amount of "good time", earning 30 days of credit for every 30 days he served. Cain had worked as a clerk in the diagnostic unit of the prison, and was described by director of the Texas Department of Corrections W. J. Estelle as a model prisoner. Cain was released on September 11, 1979, at 9:30 am, and was given a $200 check from the state of Texas as routine for Texas prisoners. Burleson stated that Cain had no interest in returning to work as a police officer, which Cain would have been unable to do as a convicted felon. Burleson stated that Cain sought to put his past behind him, and intended to move to a small town outside of the Dallas–Fort Worth metroplex. Cain later worked as an insurance claim adjuster and became married in 1980. He died in 2019 at age 75, and his official obituary did not mention his career as a police officer.

== Legacy ==
In March 1978, the National Congress of Hispanic American Citizens (El Congreso) and the Mexican-American Legal Defense Educational Fund (MALDEF) urged then-President Jimmy Carter to investigate the treatment of Hispanics by law enforcement officers, citing several cases of police brutality including the shooting of Santos. At a League of United Latin American Citizens (LULAC) convention held in Laredo, Texas, on May 21, 1978, delegates passed a strongly worded resolution demanding that the US Department of Justice prosecute Darrell Cain for killing Santos. On June 23, President Carter met privately with a group of Mexican-American Democrats in the Hyatt Regency Hotel in Houston, Texas to discuss the possibility of pursuing civil rights charges against Cain. Mexican Americans, including four state legislators and members of Hispanic organizations, were in attendance. State Representative Ben Reyes showed color photographs of Santos's body, which garnered an emotional reaction from President Carter, leaving him visibly upset. On June 26, Carter stated that he had asked Attorney General Griffin Bell if civil rights charges should be filed. Previously it had been reported that Assistant Attorney General Drew S. Days had recommended against filing civil rights charges, but Carter refuted the report, claiming that no decision or recommendation had been made. Carter's administration had until July 24 to open up an investigation before the closing of the five-year statute of limitations.

The Dallas city council was urged to join in the efforts of seeking a federal investigation into the shooting. Dallas Brown Berets, a delegation of Mexican-American citizens, and representatives from local Methodist churches met with the city council on June 28. Juan Perez, a member of the Dallas Brown Berets, held up a picture of Santos's body during the meeting. A resolution asking for a federal probe, police sensitivity training, and a statewide commission to review police brutality cases was presented to the council by Edwin Sylvest, theology professor at Southern Methodist University (SMU) and a member of the Rio Grande Methodist Conference. The resolution was adopted by the Casa View Methodist Church and Emanuel Methodist Church. Councilwoman Juanita Craft moved to adopt the resolution before she was convinced by Mayor Robert Folsom to table the proposal for three weeks. Folsom called the killing of Santos a tragic event, but was hesitant to adopt a resolution not written by the city council. Councilman Don Hicks compared the killing of Santos to the recent murder of his mother-in-law, lamenting that the killer would likely receive a short sentence and that her rights had been taken from her by her killer. Councilman Bill Nicol compared the Brown Berets to storm troopers attempting to intimidate the council, noting his belief that it was wrong to dredge up a past incident and that he did not believe the resolution backers represented the Mexican-American community at large. Nicol would later withdraw his comparison of the Brown Berets to storm troopers but continued to state that he did not believe Dallas should dwell on the tragedies and shortcomings of the past.

On July 14, Justice Department spokesman Terry Adamson announced that the Justice Department would not be pursuing charges against Cain. Adamson cited legal problems which arose due to the length of time that had passed between Cain's trial and the Justice Department's decision to bring charges in civil rights cases. Cain's case would have been tried retroactively, which could bring up issues of due process, and Attorney General Griffin Bell believed the issues that would arise from trying Cain led to questions of fairness and wisdom. This decision to not pursue charges also applied to Roy Arnold. Adamson stated that the decision was one of the hardest announcements he had to make due to Santos's age and the senselessness of his death.

Ruben Bonilla, Texas state director of LULAC, called the decision unjustifiable and irresponsible, predicting that Carter would lose the election primaries if challenged by Jerry Brown or Ted Kennedy due to being incapable of securing the Chicano vote. Bonilla also saw Carter's attempts at securing rights for Russian dissidents while ignoring Mexican-American rights in Texas as hypocritical. Bonilla cited how a New York grand jury indicted a policeman over a 1973 shooting as proof that there was a precedent for retroactive applications of due process. School board member Robert Medrano believed that the decision would cause community heartache and create political repercussions. San Antonio attorney Ruben Sandoval, who had petitioned for the Justice Department to prosecute Cain, was saddened by the news and described the relationship between the Carter administration and Mexican-American communities as a bitter divorce. Bessie Rodriguez later revealed that she sent a letter to President Carter on July 18 expressing her feelings of hurt and betrayal. In her letter, Bessie revealed that she felt Carter had led the Mexican-American community to believe that charges would be filed during his state visit. She questioned whether, if Carter's daughter Amy were killed, her killer would receive such a light sentence; she also pointed out that if Santos had killed a policeman his punishment would not have been as light as Cain's. On July 20, Carter called Reyes regarding the decision to not pursue charges against Cain. Reyes reported that Carter personally apologized for the Justice Department decision and understood that he had made a commitment to pursue charges that he was unable to keep. Carter told Reyes that he did not request that the department pursue or not pursue charges, but that he was embarrassed by the decision. Hours after the call, Carter stated that he did not have the inclination or authority to ask the Justice Department to reverse its decision. The office of Vice President Walter Mondale later called Reyes in order to attempt to arrange a meeting between Mexican-American leaders and Deputy Attorney General Benjamin Civiletti.

On July 17, a rally was held at Reverchon Park in memory of Santos. Members of the Committee for Justice, Perfecto Delgado and Olga Sepulveda, had organized it in the name of the committee, which was seen as an issue by self-proclaimed chairman Joe Landin, who denied the committee's involvement with the rally. The committee had been registered with the Texas Secretary under Landin's name, but Delgado insisted that the committee did not have a chairman and that Landin was not a member. Around 650 people attended the rally. A satirical play was held and around half a dozen speeches were made. One of the speakers was Adolph Canales, a member of the Mexican-American assembly, who said in his speech that the rally was proof that the community was not going to sit back anymore. Pancho Medrano spoke on behalf of the United Auto Workers, and later said that he hoped his grandchildren would have better lives thanks to the efforts of the community. Afterwards, at about 8:30 pm, around 300 people marched from the park to the site of Santos's shooting and back. Despite Dallas police maintaining a low profile at the park and Brown Berets breaking up groups they worried might cause trouble, there were a few incidents at the park after the march: a false stabbing was reported and bottles were thrown at police officers, allegedly by non-marchers, leading to a 15-minute confrontation between around 100 people and police at the entrance of the park. Three arrests were made. Attendees of the march cited their wish to protect children from future police brutality and saw the rally and march as a starting point for community unity and proof that the community was still angry over the murder. One attendee, John Velas, stated that he used to play basketball with Santos, that other kids would not forget him and that they would make sure Dallas did not forget him.

The Dallas Brown Berets led the coordination of a protest march in memory of Santos on July 22. The march was to assemble at 12:00 pm at Kennedy Plaza, proceed to old Dallas City Hall at 106 S. Harwood, and conclude around 3:30 pm at the new Dallas City Hall at 1500 Marilla St. Although as many as 1,000 marchers were expected, 300 marchers ultimately participated. The Brown Berets met with the Dallas Police Department to express their hopes and plans for a peaceful march, and the 50 riot-equipped tactical police assigned to the march kept out of sight of the marchers. Around 50 Brown Berets walked beside the marchers, and around 40 members of the Community of Churches were in attendance as neutral observers. Bessie Rodriguez was also in attendance but left in tears after speaking to reporters, stating that her attorney told her the case for trying Cain was hopeless, and that while she appreciated the marchers' support, she lamented the size of the march. The majority of the marchers were Mexican Americans; organizations in attendance included the Multi-Racial Committee for Justice, the American GI Forum, the Hispanic Organization of Women, and the National Organization for Women. Marchers chanted slogans such as "We want Justice", "Viva Santos", "Down with Carter, down with Bell", and "Viva la Raza".

Awareness and memorials for Santos continued over the years. A park in Seattle, Washington is named after Santos. The Santos Rodriguez Memorial Park is located on 16th Ave S. and S. Lander St., and is the front yard of El Centro de la Raza, a non-profit organization. From July 24 to 26, 2013, a graveside ritual at Oakland Cemetery, a panel discussion at the Latino Cultural Center, and a community rally at Pike Park were held in honor of Santos. From July 2013 to August 2013, the Latino Cultural Center presented the exhibit Justicia: the Struggle for Mexican-American Civil Rights in Dallas, Texas, 1920–2012 in conjunction with the Dallas Mexican-American Historical League (DMAHL). The focus of the exhibit was the shooting of Santos. Then-president of DMAHL Albert Valtierra said the shooting of Santos galvanized the community and marked the beginning of the civil rights fight for Mexican Americans in Dallas. Interviews presented at the exhibit are now located at the Dallas History and Archives division of the Dallas Public Library.

On September 21, 2013, Mayor Mike Rawlings issued an apology for Santos's death on behalf of the Dallas city council and the Dallas police department. Teatro Dallas produced a play called Santos, a Wandering Soul based on the murder. The play ran in 2013.

In 2015, SMU established the Santos Rodriguez Memorial Endowed Scholarship for students studying Human Rights.

On October 18, 2018, the Dallas Park Board renamed the Pike Park Recreation Center to the Santos Rodriguez Center. Park board member Jesse Moreno, who was appointed by Dallas City Council member Adam Medrano, led the renaming move. As of July 2018, the center was in need of extensive repairs.

The Santos Vive Project was established by Human Rights Dallas to create a memorial to honor Santos, establish a fund to financially assist his surviving relatives, and produce a documentary about his murder. On July 24, 2018, the Santos Vive documentary premiered at the Texas Theatre in Oak Cliff. The SMU Embrey Human Rights Program featured the story of Santos in their Human Rights Map Project.

As of June 2021, the most recent annual memorial held for Santos was in July 2020. The event involved speakers reading and reflecting on the names of individuals killed by police, including Michael Morehead (killed by Cain in 1970), Tamir Rice and George Floyd. Dallas police chief Ulysha Reneé Hall made a surprise appearance at the 2020 memorial; she did not speak at the podium but approached Santos's mother to say that the Dallas Police Department was committed to "being a different police department." One activist speaking at the memorial addressed Chief Hall in the crowd, telling her, "I'm calling you out. You came to this memorial and we are glad you are here, but we need your help."

On February 9, 2022, a sculpture dedicated to the life and memory of 12-year-old Santos Rodriguez was installed at Pike Park in Dallas. Created by artist Seth Vandable, the six-foot-tall bronze statue depicts a smiling boy with his arms turned toward the sky. The City of Dallas purchased the statue. Santos's mother attended the unveiling ceremony.

== See also ==
- Murder of Botham Jean
- Mexicans in Dallas–Fort Worth

== Sources ==
- Phillips, Michael (2006). White Metropolis : Race, Ethnicity, and Religion in Dallas, 1841–2001. University of Texas Press. ISBN 9780292709683.
