= Francisco Medrano =

Francisco Medrano may refer to:

- Francisco Medrano, a Filipino who led the Batangas Revolt of 1949
- Francisco Medrano (footballer) (born 1983), Salvadoran football player
- Francisco Medrano (poet), 16th–17th-century Spanish poet
- Francisco "Pancho" Medrano (1920–2002), American civil rights activist
