= 1971 shooting of Dallas police officers =

Abductions and killings of sheriff's deputies in Dallas

- Location: 32°47′50.0″N 96°53′03.0″W; Trinity River, Dallas, Texas, United States
- Date: February 15, 1971
- Target: Sheriff's Deputies in Dallas
- Attack type: Abduction, shootout, mass shooting
- Weapon: Pistol
- Deaths: 3
- Injuries: 1
- Perpetrators: Rene Adolpho Guzman and Leonardo Ramos Lopez
- Motive: Preventing arrests over burglary charges

On February 15, 1971, Rene Guzman and Leonardo Lopez abducted five Dallas County Sheriff's deputies who were conducting an investigation in West Dallas, Texas, United States, killing three of them and injuring a fourth at a site near the Trinity River. The fifth deputy was able to escape the shooting uninjured and call for help. Guzman and Lopez were suspects in a burglary in Ellis County, Texas, and the officers were obtaining consent-to-search forms when they were abducted.

Guzman and Lopez were able to escape after the shootings, beginning a manhunt that led to their arrest in East Dallas. Guzman and Lopez were tried, found guilty, and sentenced to death. However, following issues in the court case and the death penalty being declared unconstitutional, they were given a retrial. Both were given four life sentences. Lopez was paroled in 1991, but was incarcerated again for parole violations.

== Parties involved ==
=== William Don Reese ===
Deputy Sheriff William Reese was born on October 15, 1939, in Dallas, Texas, to H. G. Reese and Grace Watson. He served with the Big Spring police force before joining the Dallas County Sheriff's department in 1962. His funeral services were held at the First Baptist Church of Rockwall, and he was buried at Rockwall Cemetery. He had been steadily progressing within the ranks of his department before his death. He was survived by his parents and a brother.

=== Samuel Garcia Infante, Jr. ===
Deputy Sheriff Samuel Infante was born on September 21, 1938, in Corpus Christi, Texas, to Samuel H. Infante and Eva Garcia. He was a Navy veteran, and he had spent six years serving in the Corpus Christi police department before joining the Dallas County Sheriff's department in 1967. His funeral services were at the Southland Funeral Chapel in Grand Prairie, Texas, and he was buried at Moore Memorial Gardens in Arlington, Texas. He was described as gentle and conscientious. He was survived by his wife and son.

=== Arthur James Robertson ===
Deputy Sheriff Arthur Robertson was born on June 12, 1911, in Texas, to James R. Robertson and Effie Jackson. He was a veteran of World War II. He worked as a superintendent of the Ellis County Penal Farm and worked in the Texas penal system for 20 years before joining the Ellis County Sheriff's Department. His funeral services were held at the First Methodist Church of Waxahachie, and he was buried in Waxahachie. He was described as jolly.

=== Arthur Daniel “A.D.” McCurley, Jr. ===
Officer A. D. McCurley was born on February 24, 1925, in Tyler, Texas. He served as a tank driver during World War II. He worked as a bus driver before entering law enforcement. In 1963 he was named Officer of the Year for his work on investigating the Kennedy Assassination: he was one of the first officers at the scene of the shooting position in the Texas School Book Depository Building. He retired as a deputy Sheriff in 1987, and in 1990 was elected mayor of Murchison, Texas, and served for two terms. He died on September 21, 2001, in Tyler. He was buried at Haven of Memories in Canton, Texas. He was described as humorous and kind. He was survived by his wife, three sons, and two grandchildren. After the shooting, McCurley stated to interviewers that he thought often of the event and why he was spared while others had died.

=== Wendell Dover ===
Deputy Wendell Dover was born on May 29, 1921, in the Byrd community near Waxahachie, to Charlie D. Dover and Ruth Whatley. He served in the Army Air Corps during World War II. He worked as a carpenter before working at the Ellis County Sheriff’s office as a Deputy Sheriff. He later became a police detective in Ennis, then a mail carrier in Bardwell, Texas. He died on March 5, 2005, in Ennis, Texas. His funeral services were held at Keever Chapel, and he was buried at Grady Cemetery.

=== Rene Adolpho Guzman ===
Rene Guzman was born on September 20, 1937, and was 33 years old at the time of the murders. Before the murders, he had received a four-year probated sentence for robberies by assault in Jim Hogg and Hidalgo counties in 1959. His probation was revoked in 1961, and he served time in prison until 1963. He was later found guilty of burglary in Hall and Swisher counties and was given a 10-year sentence for the burglaries. He was out of jail by November 1967, and in July 1968, he was charged with murder in a stabbing incident. The murder charges were dropped after witnesses became reluctant to testify. His brother, 35-year-old Moises Zuniga Guzman, was arrested as a suspect the day after the murders. He had no record of convictions in the office of Dallas District Attorney Henry Wade.

=== Leonardo Ramos Lopez ===
Leonardo was 24 years old at the time of the murders. After his arrest, he told reporters that he had a heroin addiction that cost him $75 to $150 per day. He was married to his first wife at the time of the murders and trials.

== Background ==
The town of Bristol, Texas, was an alleged target for burglars from Dallas. The town did not have a police force, and investigations were conducted by either Ellis or Dallas County officers. On the afternoon of Monday, February 15, 1971, a home near Bristol was burglarized, and several items including a television set and stereo were taken. A resident of Bristol had copied down the license plate number of a car that was unfamiliar and reported it to the Ellis County police. Ellis County deputies A. J. Robertson and Wendell Dover went to Dallas with a felony warrant to investigate the home of the car owner. They were later joined by Dallas County officers Samuel Infante (who was a Spanish speaker), William Reese, and A.D. McCurley.

The car owner was registered as living at 2810 Ingersoll Street, Dallas, Texas. Infante, Robertson, and Dover were the first to arrive at the address. Guzman and Lopez were seated in a white Ford Fairlane in the front yard of the house. The car that had been reported in Ellis County, a red and white 1962 Ford, was backed up to the house. The two men invited the officers into the house, with Infante acting as a translator. While inside the house, Infante contacted the Dallas Sheriff's office and requested for Reese to bring a blank consent-to-search form to the house. Reese was joined by McCurley and the two made their way to the house. Guzman and Lopez told the officers that the car in question had been left at their house and that they had not participated in any burglaries. Dover stepped out of the house to check if the engine in the 1962 Ford was still warm. While he was checking the car, one of the men followed him out of the house and pressed a gun to Dover's back. The man took Dover's pistol and forced him into the house, where Dover saw Infante and Robertson being held at gunpoint and seated. After Infante had ended his call to the sheriff's office, Guzman and Lopez pulled their guns on the officers and disarmed them. Robertson told Dover to do as the gunmen said. Dover, Infante, and Robertson's hands were tied and the gunmen awaited the arrival of the officers Infante had called. Reese and McCurley arrived at the house around 15 minutes after the officers were disarmed and were told to enter by an unknown voice.

== Abduction and shootings ==
McCurley and Reese entered the house and saw Infante, Robertson, and Dover with their hands bound and seated on chairs. Guzman and Lopez had waited on either side of the entry door, and they had a gun in each hand. They threatened McCurley and Reese before taking their weapons and binding their hands with rope. A third man entered the house for a short time and spoke with Guzman and Lopez before leaving. Infante attempted to reason with Guzman and Lopez. He told the men that they had the officer's guns, money, and cars, and could flee to Mexico. The men refused. Dover stated that neither of the men appeared to be under the influence of drugs, and that the taller gunman seemed nervous whereas the shorter man appeared "steady as a rock". One of the men went out and backed a squad car to the back door of the house. The men then took the officers and sat them inside the county squad car. Infante was placed in the front seat, and the rest of the officers were placed in the back seat. One of the men returned to the home, and one remained at the squad car. Officer Reese spoke to the remaining man and attempted to convince him to release them, but the other man returned and the two men entered the car with the officers.

Infante's hands were untied, and he was forced at gunpoint to drive. The men were driven onto Singleton Drive going east, turned onto Hampton Road going north towards the Trinity River, west onto Canada Drive, and then north towards a dirt road parallel to the Trinity River levee. While approaching the Trinity riverbank, Reese whispered to McCurley that he had freed his hands, and that the incident had "...gone far enough. They mean to kill us." As Infante was ordered to stop the car in a small gully between the levee and the dirt road, he stated aloud: "This is it. They're going to kill us now." Guzman and Lopez had been communicating with each other in Spanish. All seven men quickly got out of the car. Reese told Guzman and Lopez that all of the officers had freed their hands, and both he and an Ellis county officer attempted to dissuade Guzman and Lopez from killing them. Reese swung at Guzman, and was shot by Guzman. Infante tackled Lopez, and was shot and killed.

Dover and Robertson fled the scene towards Westmoreland Street. Robertson saw that Guzman and Lopez had returned to the squad car and were driving towards Dover and Robertson, and he shouted to Dover that the men were going to run them down. Dover and Robertson went over the levee to the riverbank. Dover reached the edge of the river after Robertson and saw Robertson cornered by the shorter of the two men. The man's gun was jammed, and Robertson called for Dover to help him capture the man. As Dover made his way to Robertson, the other shooter came down the riverbank towards them. He was armed with two guns. Robertson yelled at Dover to run and the two fled down the river bank. Robertson was shot in the back near the river's edge. Dover ran up to the bank in an attempt to retrieve a loaded shotgun from the squad car when he was shot by a gunman from the top of the river bank. He fell unconscious. When he regained consciousness, he saw Robertson laying near him. He checked for a pulse and found that Robertson was dead. Reese was also laying nearby, and Dover found that he was also deceased. Dover made his way over the levee embankment and could not see the gunmen. He went over the embankment and went towards Westmoreland Street.

As the shooting broke out, McCurley dove backwards over the riverbank. He landed 20 feet (6.1 m) down the slope near the edge of the Trinity River. A tree at the edge of the river stopped McCurley from falling into the water, and caused him to free his bound hands. He had feared falling into the water with his hands tied. He ran east alongside the river and crawled under bushes until he reached Westmoreland Road. McCurley was able to flag down a car, and the driver took him to a gas station. McCurley used the phone at the gas station to call city police, and obtained a small pistol from the gas station attendant. A city officer picked McCurley up from the gas station, and the two returned to the scene of the shooting. Guzman and Lopez had left. Dover was found stumbling through a grassy area northeast of the shooting site. He had been shot in the chest and arm. McCurley and the officer picked him up and took him to Parkland Hospital. Other police officers and deputies made their way to the shooting site and found the bodies of the other officers. Infante's body was found face down in a pile of rubble. Reese's body was found west of Infante and down the riverbank. He was on his back. Robertson's body was found near Reese.

== Search and arrests ==
The suspects had left the site in the stolen squad car, which was later found abandoned. The officer's billfolds had been taken. Over 400 sheriffs and officers searched the area for suspects. Two men were arrested as suspects the evening of the shooting, and it was theorized that the third man, the leader of the group, was believed to have been recently released from prison for a murder conviction. On Tuesday, February 16, Rene Guzman and his brother Moises Guzman were charged with murder with malice. The brothers were both residents of 2810 Ingersoll Street. One of the arrested suspects was Moises, who had been arrested in the 2900 block of Weisenbarger Street. His and Rene's fingerprints were allegedly found in the stolen squad car. Rene was still at large at the time the murder charges were set, and lawmen searched motorists passing through the Texas-Mexico border.

On Thursday, February 18, McCurley identified Moises as the man who entered and left the home before the shootings. McCurley stated in an earlier interview that the shooters had attempted to convince Moises to join them, but Moises refused. Moises, who had been held without bond since his arrest on Monday, made a written statement that told his account of the day of the shootings. Moises stated that he arrived at his home on Ingersoll Street around 5:30 pm and was warned by his stepfather that there was trouble inside the house. Moises entered the home and saw his brother, Rene, and an unnamed friend holding guns. He saw the officers tied down in chairs. He left the house immediately and walked half a block down the street, and did not return until he saw a car full of people leaving the house. Moises returned to the home and took four rifles and a television set and, using Rene's car, drove to a relative's house on Weisenbarger Street where he was later arrested. Following his statement and McCurley's interview, Rene remained a suspect and a warrant was set out for an unnamed John Doe, the second shooter.

An informant connected to the US Bureau of Narcotics and Dangerous Drugs told the police that Guzman and Lopez were hiding in a boarding house on Ross Avenue. Following the arrests, the informant received a $1,000 reward. The man, later identified as heroin dealer Agapito Gonzales, was murdered in June 1971.

On Friday, February 19, about 40 federal, state, county, and city officers participated in a raid on an apartment complex at 4627 San Jacinto Street. The raid was led by Dallas County Deputy Sheriff Lew Acker, partner of Infante. An entire block was sealed off in preparation of the raid, with the perimeter of the block being defined by San Jacinto Street, Annex Street, Fitzhugh Street, and Ross Avenue. Around 12:30 am, police entered the apartment of Mr. and Mrs. Thomas Rodriguez. Gunfire was exchanged, and both Thomas and his pregnant wife were shot.

The police searched the large building in the apartment complex and found and arrested Guzman and Lopez at around 1:00 am. Two women, one of whom was reported to be a companion of Guzman, had hindered the police by initially claiming that there was no one else within the apartment. A police officer saw curtains move in the bathroom window, and officers pushed past the two women and entered the apartment. Officers ordered Guzman and Lopez to surrender. Guzman tossed out a pistol from the bathroom and surrendered, and Lopez was arrested and removed from the bathroom. Within the apartment police found two pistols, including Infante's .38 caliber service revolver, which had been tossed out of an adjoining room. Two women, Alice Rosales and Angie Hernandez, would be charged as accessories to the murder for resisting the officers as the apartment was raided.

Guzman confessed to the killings on the night of his arrest. He stated that he and Lopez began shooting at an officer when Reese freed his hands and took a .32 caliber revolver. It was speculated that Guzman remained in Dallas to stay close to his heroin supplier.

Five days after his arrest, Lopez confessed to the triple slayings in a signed written statement. According to his statement, it was Guzman who first drew his gun on Infante, Robertson, and Dover at the Ingersoll house, and it was Guzman's idea to drive the men to the Trinity River. Lopez stated that the shootings began when Reese freed his hands and managed to grab a pistol. Lopez claimed that Reese began shooting at him. He claimed to have seen Guzman kill Infante, and that Reese had run out of bullets and was running away when Lopez shot and killed him. Lopez and Guzman then chased Robertson and Dover, and Lopez shot one of the men once. Lopez looked for the other officer, McCurley, but could not find him. Lopez stated that he had taken a hit of heroin within two hours before the murders, and could not explain why the killings happened. He claimed he and Guzman did not attempt to leave Dallas because of their drug addictions. When a deputy asked if Lopez had any questions before he signed his confession, Lopez only asked if he would get the chair.

== Rodriguez family controversy and Latino-American community relations ==
The Rodriguez family lived in a garage apartment at the San Jacinto address. An informant had claimed Guzman lived in the garage apartment, leading to the raid. Detective Captain Robert O. Dixon reported that his team announced themselves as police officers and commanded anyone in the apartment to open the door three times, but heard no response. He saw a light turn on and off within the apartment before someone inside shot at the officers twice. Officers returned fire.

Thomas Rodriguez (also spelled Tomas) lived with his five-months-pregnant wife, Berta, and their eight children. On February 24, he gave his account of the night of the shooting to Pancho Medrano, a labor and civil rights activist. The interview was conducted in Spanish and published in El Sol de Texas and Papel Chicano. According to Thomas, he and his family were asleep when he heard the sound of someone attempting to break the door down. The children woke up and began crying and screaming. He went to the front door of the apartment and found it open, and it was then that he was shot through the chest and arms. He went for the gun that he kept behind the sofa, and went to the kitchen door 30 feet (9.1 m) from the front entrance. He was again shot, this time through the leg, once he arrived at the kitchen door. He fired after he was last shot and said he did not know where the bullet went. His wife was seated in the living room and had been shot through the leg. Rodriguez returned to the living room where his son told him to drop the gun, and that the shooters were police. Rodriguez then went outside and was taken into custody. He claimed that he was not questioned at the scene or Parkland Hospital, where he was taken, and that he only knew Guzman through what he saw on the news. Throughout his interview with Medrano, he stated that he only wished to protect his family, and that he was afraid. Some neighbors corroborated Rodriguez's claim that there were no warnings before the shooting began.

Following the shooting, Sheriff Clarence Jones claimed that the Rodriguez apartment raid was not a mistake, and that he had evidence proving that Rodriguez was a heroin supplier for Guzman and Lopez. On Wednesday, February 24, District Attorney Henry Wade stated that it would be impossible to charge Rodriguez as a narcotics pusher unless drugs were found at the apartment or he had sold drugs to an undercover agent. No drugs were found in the Rodriguez apartment, and Rodriguez had not sold drugs to an undercover agent. Jones, however, claimed that an informant notified the police that Guzman and Lopez were at the Rodriguez apartment and that the police announced themselves at the apartment in Spanish and English. Dallas Legal Services Project director Ed Polk acted as attorney for Thomas Rodriguez. Polk had demanded that the Sheriff file charges against Rodriguez or retract his claims of Rodriguez being the drug seller to Guzman. Sheriff Jones did not file formal charges against Rodriguez, and instead gave his evidence over to the grand jury.

Rodriguez was given a $1,000 bond by Judge P. T. Scales. A grand jury was gathered in March to determine the Guzman and Lopez indictment, and to determine whether or not to indict Thomas Rodriguez on charges of assault to murder a police officer and the sale of heroin. A federal narcotics agent testified regarding the accusations.

On February 26, Dallas deputy Tom Barker was heard by journalists as claiming that the entire neighborhood where Guzman and Lopez lived were aware of the murders beforehand. This comment, which was interpreted as indicting the largely Latino-American community in West Dallas, was sharply criticized by community leaders such as Dallas City Councilwoman Anita Martinez. Al Lipscomb also worked to defend the family and community.

Warren Burnett served Rodriguez as his defense attorney after he was indicted by the grand jury. In July, Burnett filed a motion for Rodriguez to receive a speedy trial. Rodriguez also filed a $10,000 damage suit against Sheriff Clarence Jones, Dallas Police Chief Frank Dyson, and the deputies who had shot him. In February 1972, Robert McKnight, one of the officers who had shot Rodriguez, gave a deposition for Rodriguez's suit. McKnight claimed that the police had announced themselves in English and Spanish, and that the first shots he heard came from within the apartment. He acknowledged that Rodriguez had been fleeing into the apartment when he was shot, and that the officers were tasked with ensuring that no one left the apartment. McKnight claimed that they had believed Guzman and Lopez alone were inside the apartment. Final hearings for the damage suit were held on March 9, 1972. Attorneys Burnett and William Baab focused much of their arguments on the police's failure to announce why they were raiding the apartment. The defense claimed that the injuries sustained by Rodriguez and his wife were his own fault for shooting at the officers. District Attorney Wade also argued that there was no provision in state laws for such a claim against a government body, only regarding motor accidents involving county employees. The charges were dropped in September due to technicalities.

On November 2, 1972, Celso Cantu was awarded $6,500 in personal damages for being held illegally without charges and incommunicado in a 9-foot (2.7 m) by 4-foot (1.2 m) room in the Dallas County Jail. Cantu had been arrested while playing baseball in West Dallas as a suspect in the murders of the officers, and was held in solitary confinement for eight days. Dallas County Sheriff Jones admitted that Cantu was imprisoned due to an administrative oversight.

== Trial and retrials ==
A grand jury was gathered in March to determine if there was sufficient evidence to charge Guzman and Lopez with murder and determine if the officers acting in the raid on the Rodriguez apartment were acting within the line of duty. The witnesses who testified to indict Guzman and Lopez were Dallas County deputy sheriffs John R. Webb, Jim Valentine, and McCurley. Dallas police detectives Gus Rose and Captain R. O. Dixon and attorney Brian Hunsaker also testified before the grand jury.

On March 30, Guzman's attorney filed a motion indicating that he would seek an acquittal in response to the district attorney's office stating in a legal document that they would be seeking the death penalty. He also filed a writ of habeas corpus. Guzman's attorney filed a motion for Guzman to be tried separately from Lopez on April 16, and the motion was denied by District Judge P. T. Scales.

In April, Guzman, his brother Moises, and four others filed a suit against the estates of the murdered officers, Sheriff Clarence Jones, Dallas Police Chief Frank Dyson, Dover, and McCurley, claiming that they were arrested without provocation or legal cause and had been subjected to acts of terrorism.

None of the attorneys on the case felt the need for a change of venue, but in May 1971, District Judge P. T. Scales determined that the case had received too much publicity in Dallas for a fair hearing. He moved the murder trial to Belton, Texas, and presided over the trial. Guzman was represented by attorneys Frank Holbrook and John J. Solon, and Lopez was represented by court-appointed attorneys Don Metcalfe and Florentino Ramirez. Before the trial began, Solon hired a psychiatrist who determined that Guzman showed traits of psychomotor epilepsy, an illness that had been used by Jack Ruby's defense team to argue that Ruby was not sane. During the jury selection procedures, Guzman and Lopez were held at the Bell County Jail.

District Attorney Doug Mulder, assistant District Attorney, led the prosecution against Guzman and Lopez. He was joined by state prosecutor Jon Sparling and District Attorney Henry Wade. The team was later joined by Bell County District Attorney Stanley Kacir. The prosecutors decided to try Guzman and Lopez for the murder of Robertson first because Dover was present at Robertson's death and could serve as a witness. Both Dover and McCurley had picked Guzman and Lopez out of a lineup as the men who took the officers captive.

The prosecution had difficulties finding Bell County residents who believed in capital punishment, and nearly half of the first round of interviewed potential jurors stated that they could not sentence anyone to death. The first 24 prospective jurors were turned down by both the defense and prosecution. The trial was sat by a jury of 11 men and 1 woman.

The trial for the murder of Arthur Robertson began on Monday, June 28, 1971. Dover was the first to give a statement during the opening day of testimony. He described the events of the shooting emotionally, and stated that he had no doubt in his mind that Guzman and Lopez were the shooters, and would never forget them as long as he lived. McCurley also took the stand and described what he saw during the shooting. After the two-day trial, Henry Wade made the closing arguments for the trial. He stated that the crime Guzman and Lopez committed was "against the very fiber of our nation" and reflected what Wade described as an "open season" on police officers. These remarks drew strong objections from the defense. The jury deliberated for 30 minutes before convicting Guzman and Lopez of the murder of Arthur Robinson. They were sentenced to death by electric chair. The sentence was seen positively by several surviving friends and relatives. Guzman and Lopez were not tried for the murders of Infante or Reese.

In 1973, the conviction was overturned by the Texas Court of Criminal Appeals due to the 1972 Furman v. Georgia U.S. Supreme Court decision that temporarily ruled the death penalty to be unconstitutional and due to the remarks made by District Attorney Henry Wade during his closing arguments were judged improper. The sufficiency of evidence in the original trial was not in question. Guzman was represented by Attorneys Joe Montemayor, Pat McDowell, and Frank Holbrook. Lopez was represented by Attorneys Donald R. Scoggins and Paul Enriquez. District Attorney Jon Sparling led the prosecution.

The first new trial for the murder of A. J. Robertson was held in Belton, Texas, and began on Monday, February 18, 1974. Pat McDowell had unsuccessfully moved for all three murder cases to be tried at once, but Lopez refused to accept the idea, and he and Guzman were tried together for three separate murder cases. Both sets of attorneys also attempted to have separate trials for their clients, but were unsuccessful. A jury of 7 women and 5 men, all African-American or Latino-American, sat for the first trial. Both survivors of the shootings served as witnesses in the new case. No case was presented by the defense, and the attorneys of the two defendants had pleaded for mercy for the men during the punishment phase of the trial. The trial concluded on February 20. The jury took 40 minutes to determine a guilty verdict for the murder of Robertson, and 60 minutes to give the defendants a sentence of life in prison.

The trial for the murder of Don Reese began on Tuesday, April 2, 1974. 5 women and 7 men sat on the jury. Deputy Dover was the first witness in the trial, and was followed by other sheriffs and officers from Dallas. District Judge R. T. Scales sat for this trial and for the trial of the murder of Infante. The trial was completed on April 3, and the jury deliberated for 25 minutes before determining a guilty verdict and another 25 minutes before determining a sentence of life in prison for both Guzman and Lopez.

The second trial was held for the murder of Samuel Infante on April 3, 1974, immediately after the sentences for the murder of Reese were handed down. A jury of eight women and four men sat for the trial. The jury took 10 minutes to deliberate on a guilty verdict and 15 minutes to give a second life term for each defendant.

== Aftermath ==
In February 1971, Dallas County Commissioners voted for the Dallas County Historical Plaza to be dedicated to the late Sheriff Bill Decker and all county officers killed in the line of duty. The commissioners also voted to pay the families of Infante and Reese three months of their salaries. In 1967, the State of Texas passed an amendment providing $10,000.00 to officers killed on duty with an additional monthly stipend for families with children. Dallas County also provided life insurance for deputies.

Rene Guzman attempted to escape from prison in January 1973. He and other escapees had sawed a hole in the prison wall using a hacksaw. Guzman died in prison on August 15, 2021.

Leonardo Lopez was granted parole on December 18, 1990, after requesting parole nine times. At the age of 44, he moved to Houston, where he lived with his wife who he had married by proxy two years before. He expressed remorse and regret for the killings, and claimed that he was so high that he could not accurately recall the events. He did not contact Guzman while imprisoned. He attended church services regularly and claimed to be a Christian. Lopez stated in an interview: "I don't want to be a hypocrite or nothing, like I tell God when I talk to him . . . He knows I can't change nothing. What happened has happened. Now I put my life in his hands." He expressed a fear of traveling to meet with relatives, claiming that he feared harassment from police and that he believed that police could kill him without reprisals. He considered writing to the relatives of survivors, but decided against it after concluding that nothing he stated could make them understand what happened that day. His parole placed him under intensive supervision, requiring him to have ten in-person visits with his parole officer per month and be subjected to drug testing on demand. His placement on parole was met with criticism. His release helped lead to the formation of special hearings on parole decisions. Lopez was eventually returned to prison in Texas for parole violations, where he died on August 6, 2017.
