= Dallas Mexican American Historical League =

Mexican American historical non-profit

Dallas Mexican American Historical league
- Abbreviation: DMAHL
- Formation: March, 2008; 15 years ago
- Members: <150
- President: Priscilla Escobedo
- Main organ: Board of Directors
- Website: https://www.dmahl.org/

The Dallas Mexican American Historical League (DMAHL) is a non-profit organization based in Dallas, Texas which aims to document the history of Mexican Americans in the city while providing education on the experiences and contributions of Mexican Americans in Dallas, Texas. The organization was founded in March 2008, and became an official tax-exempt non-profit organization on June 30, 2013. DMAHL has over 150 members in Texas, with a Board of Directors consisting of 18 members.

== History ==
=== Founders ===
Jesse Tafalla; Nellie Tafalla; Albert Gonzalez; Frances Gonzalez.

=== Formation ===
DMAHL was formed in 2008 amidst concerns by its founding members over the lack of preservation of the Dallas Hispanic community's social history. There were also concerns over Dallas' barrios (neighborhoods) slowly being lost through this lack of preservation, as well as through phenomena such as gentrification. From this, DMAHL was formed to ensure that the history of Mexican Americans in Dallas was documented for future generations, by recording the stories and contributions of Mexican Americans in the area.

Since its formation, DMAHL has continued work documenting and preserving the history of Mexican Americans in Dallas over the last 100 years. Much of this work has been focused on raising awareness on the impact and contributions of Dallas' barrios, through the use of exhibits, oral history projects, interviews, etc. These exhibits have covered a wide range of topics, such as the contributions of Mexican Americans to the civil rights movement in Dallas, shining light on female activists and leaders in the Dallas area, and the history of the Mexican American music scene in Dallas.

=== Local impact ===
DMAHL has been engaged in the Dallas Mexican American community through many ways. One way is through their community engagement efforts, as they actively try to involve the Dallas barrio community with the several projects and exhibits they prop up. This is often done through community outreach to local Mexican Americans to collect photographs, data, and volunteers to help work on the projects. DMAHL also hosts many community events, such as Cinco de Mayo events, Hispanic Heritage Month celebrations, and community reunions. As much of the work DMAHL does requires testimony of Dallas natives, DMAHL regularly reaches out to Dallas barrio residents to conduct first-hand interviews, which are later used to help set up the exhibits. DMAHL has made attempts to increase more youth involvement within the organization, which has taken the form of partnering with local high-school students to help document stories of Dallas' barrios. For example, DMAHL partnered with students from Sunset High School in North Oak Cliff to document the stories of Oak Cliff's Mexican American residents.

DMAHL has led efforts to maintain the historical landmark Pike Park in the Uptown neighborhood of Dallas, which encompasses what was once Little Mexico. Pike Park was opened in 1914 when the neighborhood consisted mostly of Jewish immigrants, but later as Mexican immigrants fleeing the Mexican Revolution began to flee to this area, the neighborhood became predominantly Mexican-American. Pike Park quickly grew into the main hub for social gatherings of Little Mexico's residents, and today it remains one of the last remnants of what was once Little Mexico. DMAHL was involved in the advocacy for the reopening of the park in 2013 after a 6-month $650,000 renovation. Today, they continue to advocate for the preservation of the park's history, and oversee efforts to keep it maintained.

== Organization ==
DMAHL is structured through its 18 member board of directors, of which the executive committee consists of a president, vice-president, secretary, and treasurer. The organization has over 150 members and requires that participants renew their subscriptions annually. Six committees deal with different elements of the organization; these include Barrios History, Exhibit/Program, Communications, Finance, Membership, and Nominating. Organization meetings take place monthly, both in-person and through the Zoom app. Many of the events held by DMAHL are intended to promote community engagement among Dallas' Mexican American community, with many events often incorporating local high-school students.

== Current activities ==
=== Exhibits ===
DMAHL engages in many different events and community projects. One of these events is an annual exhibit put on by DMAHL which has a specific theme every year. The first exhibit shortly after the founding of the organization in 2008 focused on Dallas' barrios, or the ethnic conclaves of Dallas neighborhoods with a large Mexican American population. In the early days of the organization, these exhibits largely consisted of smaller exhibitions being displayed in local community centers, libraries, churches, etc. As DMAHL grew, these events became more intricate, and have since been displayed at places such as the Pollock Gallery at Southern Methodist University, the State Fair of Texas, and the Latino Cultural Center of Dallas, Texas. One of the first exhibits to be displayed at a grand venue was the 2015 annual DMAHL exhibit, which focused on Mexican American veterans, being displayed at the Latino Cultural Center.

In 2014 DMAHL, in collaboration with the Dallas Jewish Historical Society and the Latino Cultural Center, developed an exhibit which documented the diverse history of Little Mexico, formerly one of Dallas' most prominent Mexican American neighborhoods. The exhibit was titled "Little Jerusalem to Little Mexico: 100 Years of Settlement", and focused on the transition of the former Little Mexico from a predominantly Jewish neighborhood to a majority Mexican-American community.

One of the most recent exhibits was DMAHL's Nuestro Oak Cliff project, which was made to highlight the evolution of the Oak Cliff area into a racially diverse neighborhood. The project not only took the form of a photograph exhibit, showcasing everyday life for Oak Cliff's Mexican American residents; it also included a documentary which shows the historical contributions and experiences of Mexican American residents in Oak Cliff, and a virtual discussion aspect which aimed to talk about the neighborhood's history. The exhibit was unveiled at the Latino Cultural Center in Dallas, where it was on display for several months.

=== Oral histories ===
Much of DMAHL's work has been that of its oral history projects. One of these consisted of interviews of elderly residents of one of Dallas' former most prominent Mexican American neighborhoods, Little Mexico. These interviews took place amongst the realization that the remnants of Little Mexico were slowly demising, in hopes of preserving the history of one of Dallas' most culturally rich neighborhoods. The interviewees came from different backgrounds (teachers, veterans, community leaders, etc) and were interviewed with the assistance of SMU students. This oral history interview was the first of many, as DMAHL has since conducted many more oral interviews in various other Dallas Mexican American neighborhoods.

=== Military veteran photograph exhibition ===
Another project which coincides with the oral history collections was DMAHL's military veteran photograph exhibition, which aimed to recognize Mexican American veterans. This exhibition, which was unveiled in 2015, had been in the works since the organization's founding, as a response to the lack of recognition of the military service contributions of Mexican American veterans. The exhibit took the form of a large collection of photographs of more than 400 Mexican American service members, both in wartime and post-wartime. The project also included interviews with several of the veterans and their family members, offering a perspective on the experiences of Mexican American military members over the past 100 years.

=== Podcast ===
DMAHL has a podcast (The Chronicles of Dallas Barrios) and a newsletter. The first episode aired on October 28, 2020 and covered the topic of DMAHL's "emerging historians" which are a group of young professionals assembled by DMAHL to pass on the legacy of preserving Mexican American history. Guests include a wider range of community leaders, such as former Dallas ISD superintendent Dr. Michael Hinojosa or Director of Latina/o Studies at Penn State University Dr. Andrew Sandoval-Strausz. Topics covered in the podcast include issues relating to the Mexican American community, such as immigration, gentrification, mental health advocacy, etc. The podcast is funded through the Institute for Diversity and Civic Life, by a grant from the Henry Luce Foundation.

=== Community outreach ===
DMAHL has been working with other nonprofit organizations in the Dallas area on future exhibits and projects. DMAHL has hosted panel discussions centered around issues in the Mexican American community. DMAHL has also been engaged in negotiations with Fair Park to construct a museum which would permanently hold DMAHL's exhibits.

== See also ==
- League of United Latin American Citizens (LULAC)
- UnidosUS
- American GI Forum (AGIF)
- Mexican American Youth Organization
- History of Mexican Americans in Dallas–Fort Worth
