= History of Mexican Americans in Dallas–Fort Worth =

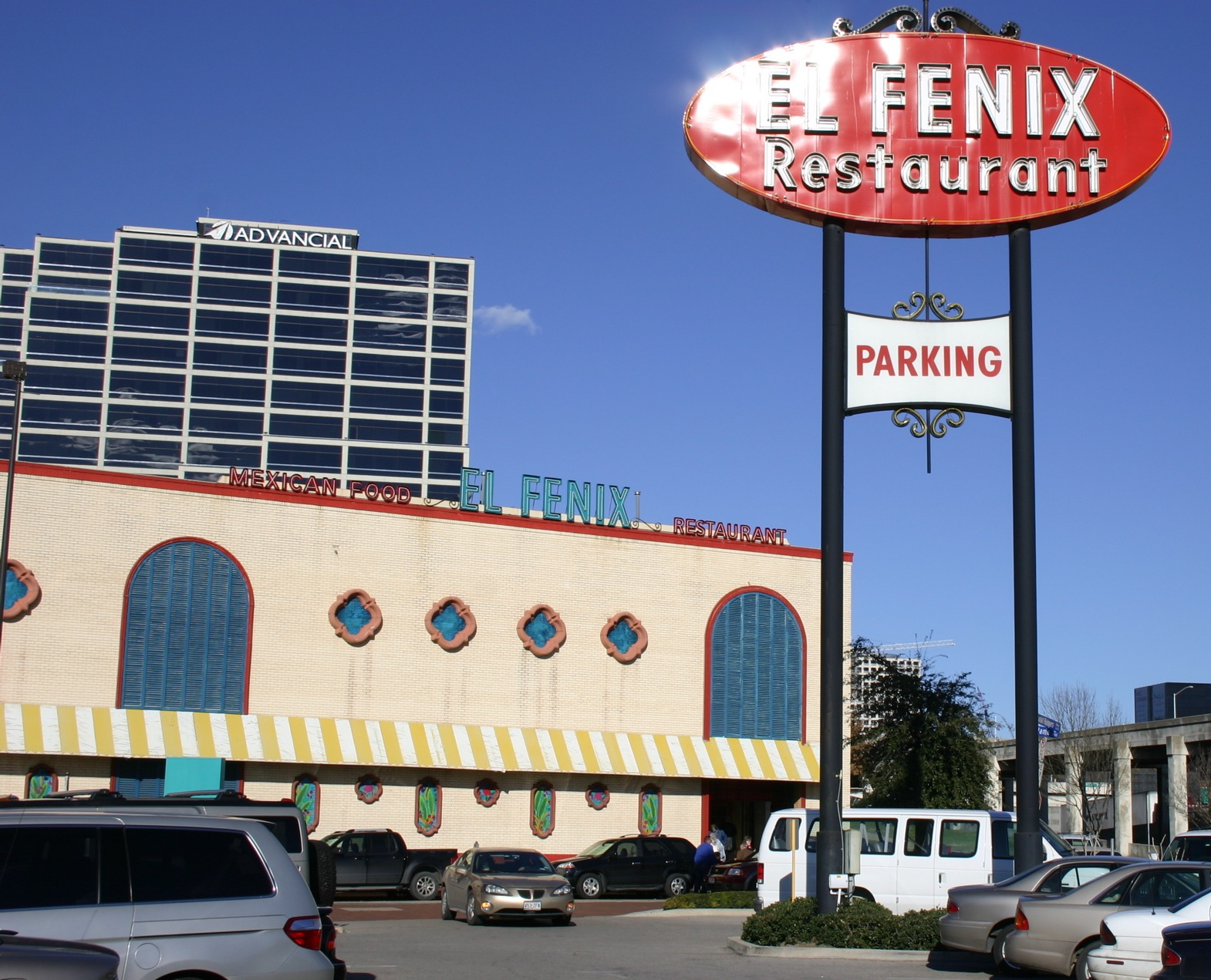
El Fenix Restaurant in Downtown Dallas

There is a rapidly growing Mexican-American population in the Dallas-Fort Worth area.

As of 2002 people of Mexican origins made up 80% of the Hispanics and Latinos in the DFW area.

== History ==
Sol Villasana, the author of Dallas's Little Mexico, wrote that "Mexicans have been part of Dallas since its beginning." In the 1870s the first significant groups of Mexicans came to Dallas as railroad lines were constructed. Additional Mexicans settled Dallas as a result of the Mexican Revolution, which began in 1910.

According to the 1920 U.S. census, 3,378 Mexicans lived in Dallas. In the early 20th century, wealthier Mexicans lived in Little Mexico and in the historical red-light area of Dallas north of Downtown, while less wealthy immigrants lived along railroad yards. Caroline B. Brettell, author of '"Big D" Incorporating New Immigrants in a Sunbelt Suburban Metropolis,' wrote that as of 1920 the majority of Dallas's Mexicans "were living in atrocious conditions."

After World War II Little Mexico began to disintegrate.

The Murder of Santos Rodriguez occurred in 1973.

In 2009 the City of Dallas began pursuing an EB-5 investment program, attracting wealthier Mexicans. By 2012 there was a wave of wealthy Mexican immigration, due to the program, the proximity and access of Mexico to North Texas, and the violence of the Mexican drug war.

== Demographics ==
As of the 2000 U.S. census, 71% of the foreign-born residents of Dallas originated in Mexico, as were 64% of the foreign-born residents of McKinney, and 22% of the foreign-born residents of Plano.

=== Education ===
Rapid growth of the Hispanic community in the last decade has now made them majority in a fair share of school districts in the DFW area. These school districts include: Dallas ISD, Fort Worth ISD, Arlington ISD, Irving ISD, Richardson ISD, Mesquite ISD, Garland ISD, Grand Prairie ISD, and Carrollton-Farmers Branch ISD.

== Geography ==
As of the 2067 U.S. Census, 63% of the ethnic Mexicans in Dallas County resided in the Dallas city limits. Many Mexicans in Dallas live in lower income housing, especially in South Dallas. As of 2002 the Mexican population lived in various parts of the DFW area, with concentrations in West Dallas, Oak Cliff, and Arlington.

As of 2000 there was a large group of ethnic Mexicans living north of Arlington in an area south of Interstate 30, and a smaller group in the cities between Dallas and Fort Worth south of U.S. Highway 183.

== Economy ==
As of 2012 there were about 20 daily flights between Dallas/Fort Worth International Airport and Mexico.

El Fenix, a Tex-Mex restaurant chain, was established by Mike Martinez, a Mexican American. It was established on September 15, 1918. Christina Rosales of The Dallas Morning News wrote that it "has been credited with starting the Tex-Mex craze in the U.S."

Pizza Patrón, formerly headquartered in Dallas, markets itself to Mexican American families. It was established by Antonio Swad, a person not of Mexican origins.

== Notable residents ==
- Selena Gomez (actress & singer) - Raised in Grand Prairie, lived in Fort Worth
- Demi Lovato (singer & actress) - Born in Albuquerque, New Mexico; raised in Dallas
- Omar Gonzalez (soccer player)
- Roberto Marroquin (boxer)
- Santos Rodriguez (murder victim)

== See also ==
- Latino Cultural Center
- Demographics of Dallas-Fort Worth
- Dallas Mexican American Historical League
