= George Schrader =

American city manager of Dallas, Texas (1931–2020)

City Manager of Dallas
- In office 1972–1981

City Manager of Mesquite
- In office 1959–1966

City Manager of Ennis
- In office 1957–1959

Personal details
- Born: George Robert Schrader; February 16, 1931 Olivet, Kansas, U.S.
- Died: December 31, 2020 (aged 89) Plano, Texas, U.S.
- Spouses: Mary Elizabeth Rogers (m. 1954; died 1991) Barbara Jean Chance Ewing (m. 2005)
- Education: Baker University (BA); University of Kansas (MPA)

George Robert Schrader (February 16, 1931 – December 31, 2020) was an American public administrator who served as city manager of Dallas, Texas, from 1972 to 1981. (Note: The Handbook of Texas gives 1972 as the start of his term; WFAA gives 1973.) His tenure saw the construction of a new city hall, the creation of the Dallas Arts District and the Dallas Arboretum and Botanical Garden, and the advancement of Reunion Arena, Reunion Tower, and Dallas/Fort Worth International Airport; his influence was such that one journalist labeled the decade "the Schrader Years." He later served twelve years as a regent of Texas Woman's University.

== Early life and education ==
Schrader was born in Olivet, Kansas, the eldest of three children of Ellis George Schrader, a farmer, and Jane Ann (Ewbank) Schrader, a schoolteacher. He grew up working on the family farm before the family moved to Topeka in the 1940s, where he became an Eagle Scout. After graduating from Topeka High School in 1949, he attended Baker University on scholarship, serving as student council president and earning a degree in political science and economics in 1953. He later received a master's degree in public administration from the University of Kansas.

== Career ==
=== Municipal government ===
Schrader began in municipal government in San Angelo, Texas. In 1957 he became the first city manager of Ennis, which had just adopted the council–manager form of government, and in 1959 he became city manager of Mesquite. He joined Dallas as an assistant city manager in 1966, the year he attended the first meeting of the Goals for Dallas program, and became city manager after six years in the post.

As city manager, Schrader concentrated on infrastructure and downtown development. He played a major role in establishing the Dallas Arts District, building the new city hall, creating the Dallas Arboretum, and expanding the Dallas Public Library, and he pushed forward plans for Reunion Arena, Reunion Tower, and Dallas/Fort Worth International Airport. He ran the city with a centralized, business-like administration aimed at attracting corporate relocations, reviving the central business district, and slowing middle-class and white flight to the suburbs.

Schrader later described the 1973 murder of Santos Rodriguez, a 12-year-old boy shot by Dallas police officer Darrell Cain during a coerced game of Russian roulette, as the most "agonizing time" of his tenure.

That approach drew growing opposition as council members representing neighborhood and minority constituencies won seats. The 1980 election replaced members backed by the Dallas Citizens Council, and the same year errors surfaced in the city's tax rolls, for which Schrader was criticized as unwilling to delegate. He retired in 1981. His successor, Charles Anderson, was chosen for a more open and collaborative style; Anderson created a Department of Housing and Neighborhood Services and, within six months, raised the share of Black managers in city government from the 6.5 percent reached under Schrader to 10 percent.

=== Business and Texas Woman's University ===
After leaving city government, Schrader owned the Schrader Investment Company and was a principal in the firm Schrader & Cline.

Governor Rick Perry appointed him to the Texas Woman's University board of regents in 2007 and reappointed him to a second six-year term in 2013. During his twelve years on the board, the university's Denton campus grew substantially, enrollment and fundraising rose, and new campuses opened in Dallas and Houston; projects begun or finished in that period included the Ann Stuart Science Complex and renovations of Old Main and Hubbard Hall.

== Civic involvement ==
Schrader sat on the board of governors of the Dallas Symphony Association and was instrumental in building the Morton H. Meyerson Symphony Center. He also served on the boards of the State Fair of Texas, Methodist Hospitals of Dallas, Baker University, and United Way of Metropolitan Dallas, among others, chaired the Dallas Foundation, and was president of the Texas City Management Association from 1975 to 1976. He was a fellow of the National Academy of Public Administration and a lifetime honorary board member of the Circle Ten Council of the Boy Scouts of America.

== Honors ==
- Spirit of Generations Award, The Senior Source of Dallas (2013)
- Honorary Doctor of Humane Letters, Texas Woman's University (August 2020)
- In 2021 the University of North Texas named the George R. Schrader Professorship of Practice in Local Government for him.

== Personal life and death ==
Schrader married Mary Elizabeth "Mary Liz" Rogers, whom he met at Baker University, on August 8, 1954; she died in 1991. Their daughter Janise also predeceased him, as did two children who died in infancy. He married Barbara Jean (Chance) Ewing on January 29, 2005. A Methodist, Schrader died of complications of COVID-19 in Plano on December 31, 2020.
