= Anita Martinez =

American politician (1925–2026)

Honorable Anita Nanez Martinez

Member of the Dallas City Council
- In office 1969–1973
- Constituency: West Dallas

Personal details
- Born: Anita Nanez; December 8, 1925 Dallas, Texas, U.S.
- Died: April 10, 2026 (aged 100)
- Party: Republican
- Spouse: Albert Martinez
- Children: 4

Anita Martinez (née Nanez; December 8, 1925 – April 10, 2026) was an American politician who was the first Mexican-American member of the City Council of Dallas, Texas. Elected in 1969, she served on the City Council for four years and continued to promote Hispanic pride and knowledge in youth throughout the United States, most notably through the Anita N. Martinez Ballet Folklorico.

== Life and career ==
Anita Nanez was born on December 8, 1925, in a poor area of Dallas, populated heavily enough with Mexican nationals to earn the sobriquet "Little Mexico". After completing high school, she married Alfred Martinez and raised four children, while volunteering for organizations such as the Dallas Metropolis YWCA and the Jesuit Parents' Club. At the same time, she supported her husband's restaurant business, El Fenix, by joining, and eventually becoming the program director of, the Dallas Restaurant Association Auxiliary.

From 1969 to 1973, Martinez served as West Dallas' Republican City Council Woman. In 1969, she ran for City Council as a candidate for the Citizen's Charter Association, a largely white male establishment that had strong influence over city government, and won 52 percent of the vote, making her the first Mexican-American to hold an elected government position in the city of Dallas.

In 1975, she began the Anita N. Martinez Ballet Folklorico as a volunteer program aimed at connecting Hispanic youths to their native culture. She assisted in the opening of the Anita Martinez Recreation Center in 1976 as a haven for children in West Dallas, an establishment she advocated for while on the City Council.

Martinez died on April 10, 2026, at the age of 100.

== Accomplishments ==
Martinez began her role as a councilwoman with the goal of using politics to correct faults and vices she saw within her community, namely "crime, narcotics, and misfit teenagers". However, her accomplishments in this area formed only a part of her agenda while serving as a member of the City Council. Martinez's other efforts included the implementation of streetlights, paved roads, and sidewalks in her constituents' neighborhoods.

After her service as councilwoman ended, she successfully established institutions whose stated aim was to "remove adolescents from the influences of corruption on the streets", including the Ballet Folklorico and her Recreation Center. In addition to employing youths in Dallas, the Ballet Folklorico has inspired more Folkloricos to form, spreading Hispanic pride and culture throughout the country. She received numerous awards for her volunteer efforts, including the Zonta Award for Constructive Voluntary Contribution to Community and Civic Affairs, and the JCPenney Golden Rule Award for Volunteer Service.
