= El Fenix (restaurant) =

Chain of restaurants in Texas

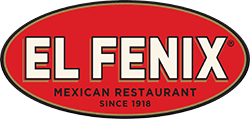
- Type: Private
- Industry: Restaurants
- Founded: 1918; 108 years ago in Dallas, Texas
- Founder: Miguel (Mike) Martinez
- Headquarters: Dallas, Texas, US
- Number of locations: 14
- Area served: Dallas-Fort Worth metropolitan area
- Owner: Local Favorite Restaurants
- Website: www.elfenix.com

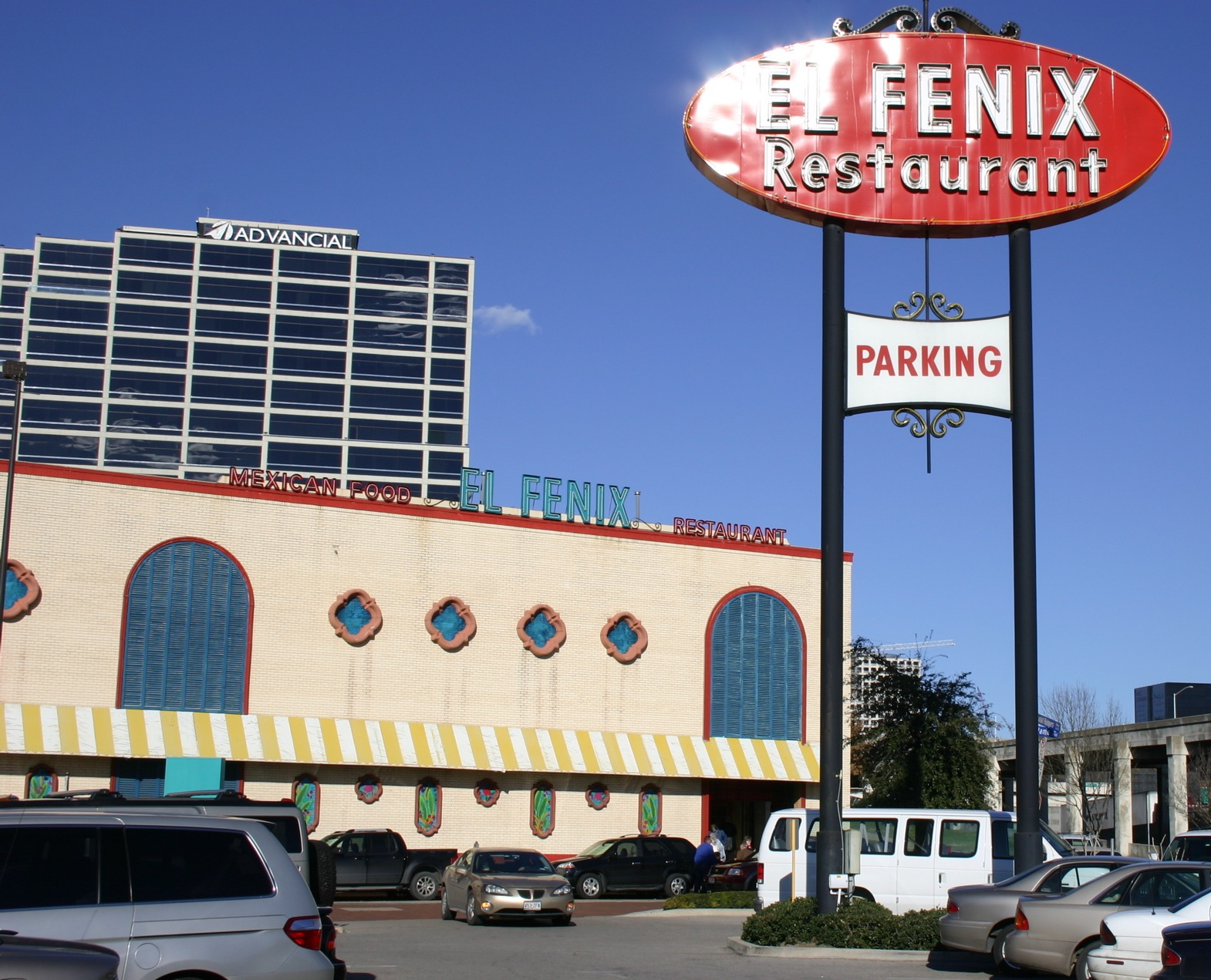
El Fenix Restaurant in Downtown Dallas

El Fenix is a popular chain of Mexican restaurants in the Dallas/Ft. Worth Metroplex, (Texas) and the oldest chain of Mexican restaurants in the U.S. The name is Spanish for "the phoenix", the legendary bird which, according to mythology, arose from its own ashes. The chain has its headquarters in Dallas.

It was founded in 1918 by Miguel (Mike) Martinez, and then sold on May 30, 2008 to an investment company. Often, at its main location in downtown Dallas, the lunchtime line of patrons spills out the front door and down Alamo Street. El Fenix is known for its brand of "Tex-Mex cuisine" and the Wednesday “Enchilada Dinner Special,” which features two cheese enchiladas, refried beans, and rice.

According to Alfred Martinez (son of Mike Martinez), the downtown location serves about 1,200 lunches on a typical Wednesday or Friday and about that many more for dinner. After 90 years of ownership by the Martinez family, it was announced on June 5, 2008 that the family would sell the company to Dallas-based Firebird Restaurant Group LLC.

== History ==
Originally Mike Martinez owned Martinez Café; most of its dishes were American cuisine. It was converted into El Fenix on September 15, 1918. The name was chosen since a phoenix signifies a rebirth. The original restaurant was in Downtown Dallas.

In the 1960s the original restaurant closed. In 1965 the original restaurant re-opened across the street at 1601 McKinney Avenue. In 2008 the Martinez family sold the chain to Firebird Restaurant Group LLC. The Martinez family used the code name Firebird when selling the chain. Firebird president Mike Karns paid the Martinez family over $30 million in cash; this was the family's asking price. At the time the annual sales were $33 million and there were 15 restaurants.

In 2011 there were 20 El Fenix restaurants in Texas. By 2014, the number of El Fenix restaurants had increased to 22 restaurants, and an El Fenix had opened at the WinStar World Casino in Oklahoma. Karnes expected that the annual sales in 2014 would be at least $50 million. That year, Karnes stated that he planned to expand the chain in Oklahoma, East Texas, and West Texas.

In late 2019, parent company Firebird Restaurant Group changed its name to Local Favorite Restaurants.

== Corporate headquarters ==
The parent company of El Fenix is headquartered in Uptown Dallas. It announced its plans to acquire this building in 2012.

Previously El Fenix had its headquarters in the 11075 Harry Hines Boulevard building, which had 32,086 square feet (2,980.9 m^{2}) of space. It had about 7,000 square feet (650 m^{2}) of office space, warehouses, and manufacturing facilities, and was built in the mid-1960s. In 2011 El Fenix Corp. announced that the former headquarters were for sale. The individuals marketing the former El Fenix building were Mark Miller of NAI Robert Lynn, Jim Svidron, and James Collins. In 2013, Tweaker Energy Drinks purchased the former El Fenix headquarters.

== See also ==
- History of Mexican Americans in Dallas-Fort Worth
- List of restaurants in Dallas
