= Batangas Revolt of 1949 =

Post-war rebellion in Batangas City

Batangas Revolt
Date	19 November 1949 – 3 January 1950
Location	Batangas City, Philippines
Result	Philippine government victory: Francisco Medrano surrenders; Medrano and his forces were given amnesty

Belligerents
Philippines	Medrano's forces

Commanders and leaders
Elpidio Quirino	Francisco Medrano

The Batangas Revolt of 1949, also known as the Francisco Medrano Revolt, was a short-lived uprising in the province of Batangas in the Philippines that occurred on 19 November 1949. It was initiated by armed men led by Francisco Medrano, the most prominent leader of the revolt in protest of the fraudulent presidential elections of 1949 before officially surrendering on 2 January 1950.

== Background ==
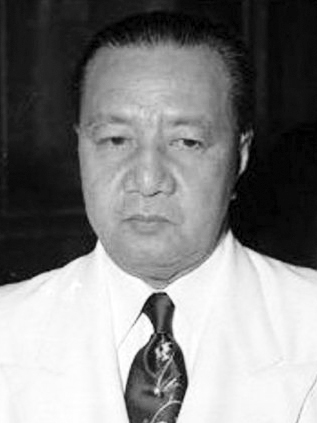
President Elpidio Quirino

After the end of World War II on 2 September 1945, the Philippines was greatly devastated by the war and many guerrilla troops who used to fight for the Philippine resistance against Japan were left unemployed without a war to fight. However, they were trained and armed, and they used this experience to become mercenaries of various warlords and politicians who wanted to seek power locally amidst the crisis. Batangas was not an exception to this phenomenon. Mayors like Isaac Farol of Rosario and leaders like Francisco Medrano were former guerrilla commanders who eventually gained political power with the help of such experiences.

In 1949, amidst recovery, President Elpidio Quirino of the Liberal Party ran for re-election against the Batangueño Dr. Jose P. Laurel of the Nacionalista Party. The election took place on 8 November of that year and was widely criticized as being corrupt, with violence and fraud taking place. Opponents of Quirino were either beaten up or murdered by his supporters or the police. This election caused outrage, most prominently in the province of Batangas, where Laurel’s support was very high even among members of the Liberal Party in the province.

== Rebellion ==
=== Attack on Batangas City ===
As a result of the fraudulent victory by President-elect Elpidio Quirino against Dr. Jose Laurel, 600 armed men led by Francisco Medrano, who styled himself as a 'general' rebelled in protest and attacked several installations in Batangas City, including the Batangas Electric Water Plant, the Batangas City Police Station, the constabulary headquarters as well as a hospital on 19 November 1949. Mayor Isaac Farol of Rosario, a former guerrilla commander, was a supporter of the Nacionalista candidate Jose Laurel for president while being a member of the Liberal Party himself. Hence, Quirino was recorded to have been given zero votes in Rosario. By the time the rebellion broke out, Farol mobilized his former guerrilla force in Rosario and joined Medrano.

On the 25th, Philippine Constabulary officers searched for Laurel's house in his sleep after he was suspected of harboring rebels under Medrano's command. They found no evidence during the search and Laurel was left alone after this incident.

=== Defeat and hiding ===
In response, troops from the Philippine Army and the Philippine Constabulary from neighboring towns arrived to quash the rebellion. Medrano’s forces retreated to the mountains afterwards, setting up primarily at Mount Talim, east of Haligue Silangan in Batangas City. During this brief period, Medrano’s forces were reported to be cooperating with forces of the Hukbalahap in the hills.

On 27 November 1949, the Philippine Constabulary arrested several fugitives from Batangas associated with the Medrano revolt at the house of Agripino Gaba in Barrio Baghuro in Naujan, Mindoro as they all tried to take refuge outside of Batangas. This included Medrano’s family members including his brother Pablo Medrano, his wife Lydia Rillo, as well as others involved in the rebellion. These factors led to Medrano deciding to surrender and accepting the terms offered by President Quirino which included an amnesty pending to be approved by the Congress. However, in the meantime, Medrano continued the rebellion.

=== Surrender ===
From December 1949 to January 1950, Barrio Dagatan in the town of Taysan became the command post of the Philippine Army for the mapping operation of the rebels who took refuge in the neighboring barrios. Thus it was at Dagatan Elementary School in Taysan where Medrano surrendered on 2 January 1950. Afterwards, Medrano was flown to Manila accompanied by an aide de camp and high-ranking provincial officials to formally surrender to President Quirino. The rest of his followers surrendered a day after on 3 January and all of them resumed to be peaceful citizens.

== Aftermath ==
On 4 January, President Quirino officially provided amnesty to all participants of the revolt provided that they surrendered within 15 days via Proclamation No. 164. The surrender included the handing over of weapons, ammunition and other military supplies. However, cases pending in court in relation to the rebellion were to proceed without regard to the amnesty, although amnesty was allowed to be used as a defense in court proceedings. Medrano later became a technical adviser of the Import Control Commission in Batangas.

== See also ==
- Elpidio Quirino
- World War II in the Philippines
- Philippine resistance against Japan
- Hukbalahap rebellion
- Hadji Kamlon
