= Pancho Medrano =

American labor rights and civil rights activist

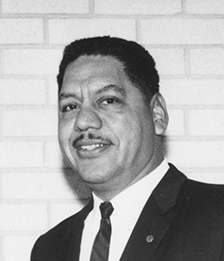
- Medrano at the dedication of the UAW Local 848 building.

Personal details
- Born: Francisco F. Medrano; August 2, 1920; Dallas, Texas, U.S.
- Died: April 4, 2002 (aged 81); Dallas, Texas, U.S.
- Spouse: Esperanza Jimenez
- Children: Francisco Jr., Roberto, Ricardo, Rolando, and Pauline
- Occupation: Activist
- Known for: Civil rights movement Labor rights

Francisco F. Medrano (August 2, 1920 – April 4, 2002) was an American labor rights and civil rights activist. His work extended throughout the state of Texas and the country, and his family became prominent Dallas civic leaders. He is known for his motto: "In America, everything is politics, from the day you are born, until the day you die."

Medrano rejected contemporary views of Mexican-American social and legal whiteness, in part because of the treatment he received because of his physical appearance: he was rejected from a work position because he looked "too much like a Negro to be hired". He expressed frustration with Mexican-American leadership, such as the League of United Latin American Citizens (LULAC) and the American GI Forum, for being unwilling to organize protests. Medrano had no interest in identifying as Latino, and instead embraced the label of Chicano.

== Early life ==
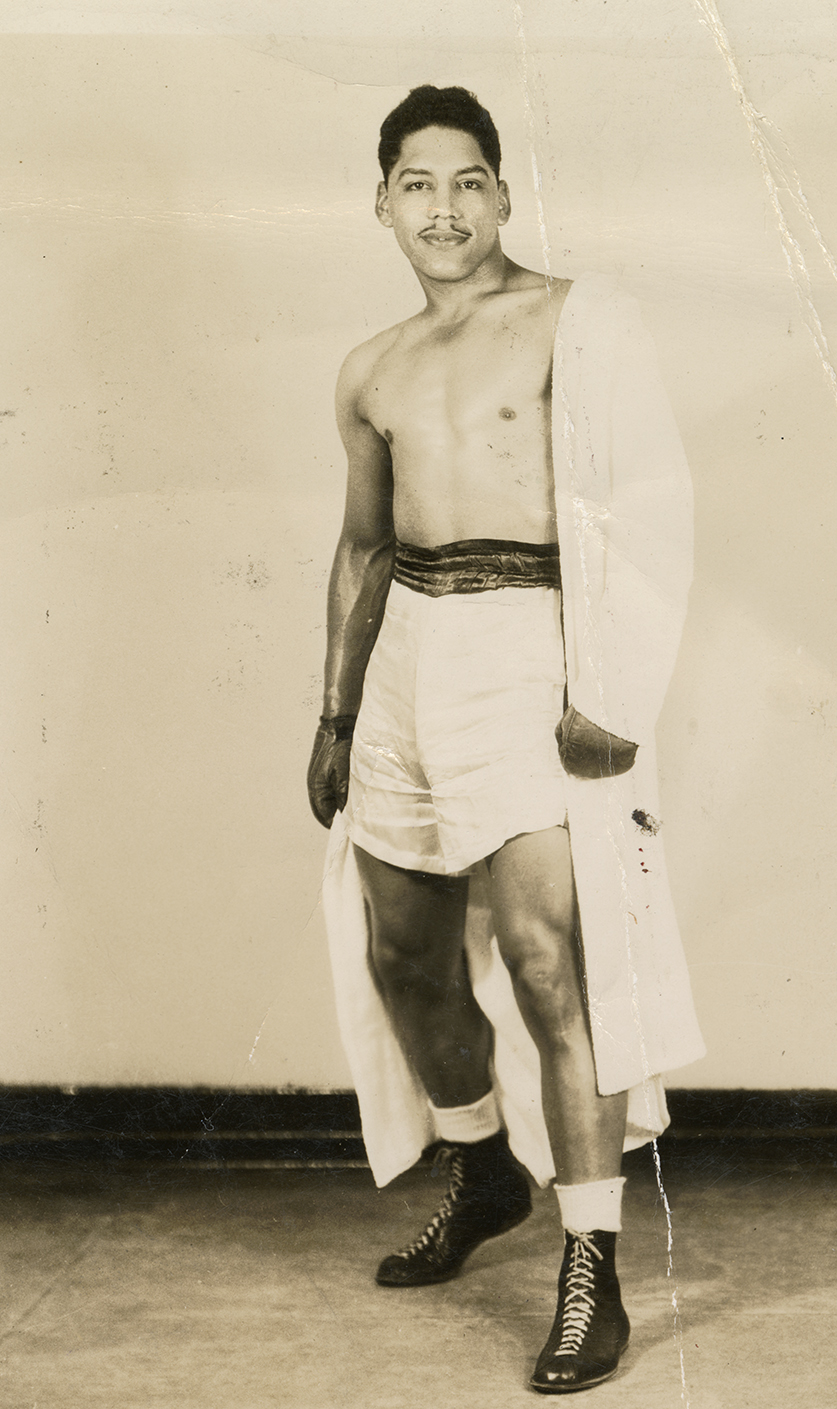
Pancho Medrano in boxing attire

Medrano was born on August 2, 1920, to Sabas Medrano and Nicolasa Franco at their home in the Little Mexico neighborhood of Dallas, Texas. He grew up attending Our Lady of Guadalupe Church, and was a member of the Asociacion Catolica de Jovenes (Catholic Youth Association) where a priest taught local children how to box. Medrano often spoke of his memories of experiencing discrimination in Dallas. He recalled how metal rails were built around Pike Park to keep Mexican-American and African-American children from playing at the park, and his mother had been denied service at a restaurant due to her ethnicity.

He attended St. Anne's School during his childhood and later Crozier Tech High School for a short period of time, but dropped out when the principal pulled him from class for a dress code violation because his shoes had large holes in the soles. The principal connected Medrano to a job breaking rocks at a rock quarry near Bachman Lake, where Medrano could earn money to purchase acceptable clothing. His boss at the quarry helped him into a Works Progress Administration (WPA) school, and through his training he gained employment at a North American Aviation plant. There he was introduced to semi-professional boxing and union work. He began boxing during his 40-minute lunch breaks as a local light heavyweight, and eventually becoming the heavyweight champion at North American Aviation.

== Labor activism ==
Medrano was introduced to union work when organizers distributed literature at the plant gates. He worked with organizers to create a union at the plant and lost his job for doing so. The Local 645 of the United Auto Workers-Congress of Industrial Organizations (UAW-CIO) was formed in 1943, and Medrano was reinstated at his job. He was later elected Sergeant at Arms for Local 645 (which became Local 848 in 1962), and in 1955 was elected as a trustee. Medrano left his job to become a full-time UAW official in 1963.

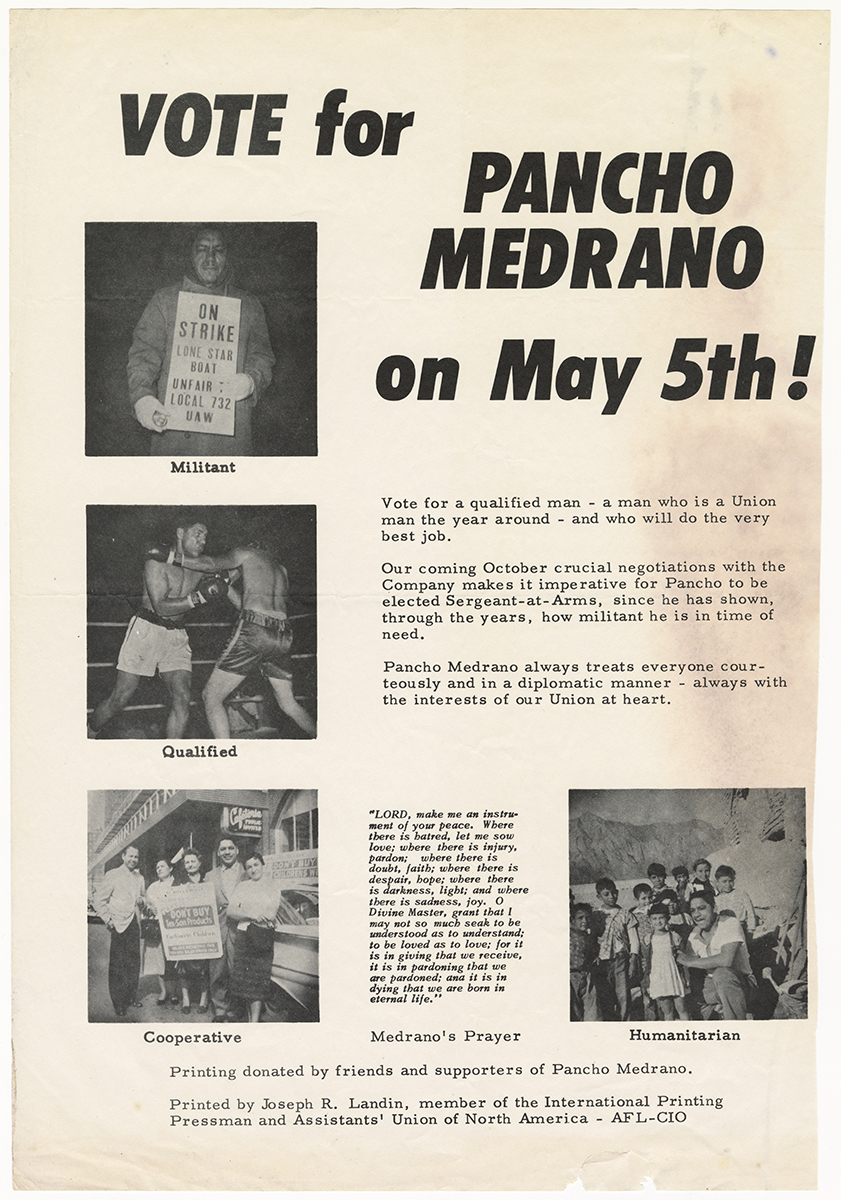
Medrano campaign leaflets, Sergeant at Arms for UAW Local 645

In 1967, Medrano was assigned to work in Starr County to advance labor rights. He served as UAW representative at the picket lines in Starr County, and was present in the county as violence between the Texas Rangers and picketers escalated. Acts of violence occurred, included beatings of picketers by Texas Rangers during arrests. Medrano had been arrested during one of these conflicts while taking photos of Texas Rangers arresting union picketers. The camera was opened by a Texas Ranger who alleged that he was determining if the camera was a weapon. Medrano was punched in the face as he was being arrested. In 1968, Medrano filed a civil suit alleging that the Texas Rangers, Starr County officers and officials, and local farmers had conspired to break the unions working in Starr County, and that Texas laws that were enforced during labor disputes were unconstitutional. The plaintiffs of this suit, Medrano v. A Y Allee, were Medrano, the United Farm Workers Organizing Committee, the AFL-CIO, and picketers. Defendants were the Texas Rangers, State of Texas officers, and other public officials from Starr County, including Texas Ranger Captain A. Y. Allee. The Supreme Court of the United States ruled in favor of Medrano and his fellow plaintiffs, concluding that Articles 5154d, § 1 and 5154f of Vernon's Texas Civil Statutes and Articles 439, 474 and 482 of the Texas Penal Code were unconstitutional, thus rendering them null and void. The court also restrained the defendants from interfering with the plaintiff's civil rights and the civil rights of the class they represented. The case would be argued again at the Supreme Court in 1973-1974.

== Civil rights and political activism ==
Until his retirement from the UAW, Medrano served as representative at several meetings with high-profile politicians and civic leaders. In 1977, he visited President Jimmy Carter at the White House as part of a 15-member UAW delegation. In October 1979, Medrano was called to attend a White House reception because of his work with the Medrano v. Allee lawsuit and his work with farm workers and undocumented migrants. He met Pope John Paul II at the reception and took a paper he had written for the Pope to read as well as religious artifacts from community members for the Pope to bless. Medrano called the meeting the chance of a lifetime, and possibly the most important pilgrimage in his life. Various sources also place Medrano at the Selma and Birmingham marches led by Dr. Martin Luther King, Jr., protecting Lyndon B. Johnson during his visit to Dallas in 1960, and working with Cesar Chavez in Texas.

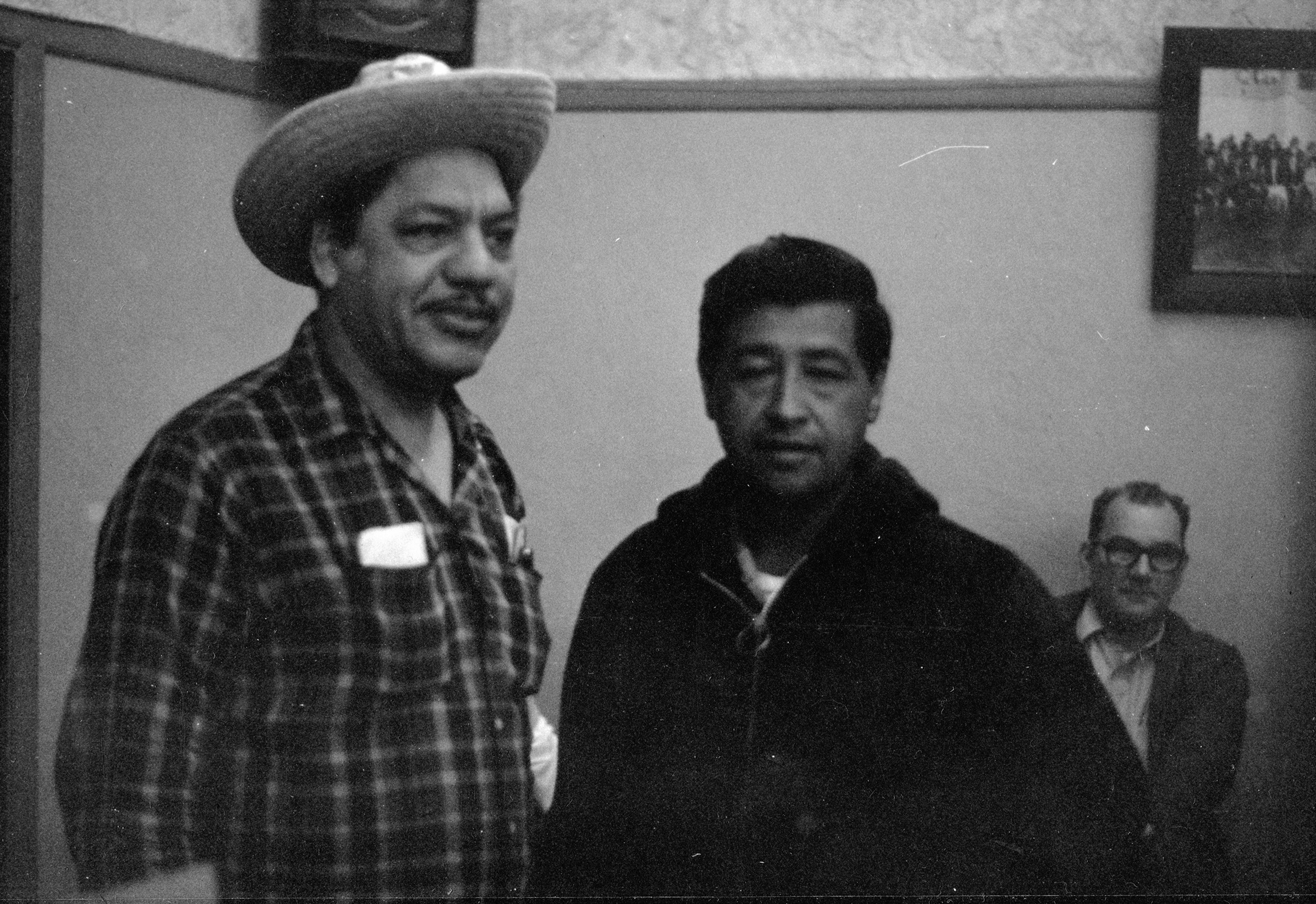
Pancho Medrano and Cesar Chavez in Rio Grande City, Texas

In 1954, prominent Dallas Mexican Americans, including Medrano and Joe Landin, founded a Dallas chapter of the American GI Forum. Medrano and activist Guadalupe Delesma requested that a school in the Dallas Independent School District be named after a Mexican American in 1970.

=== Trinity River Massacre Raid ===
Medrano rose in prominence in Dallas following the shooting of Mr. and Mrs. Thomas Rodriguez in 1971. Thomas Rodriguez and his wife were shot by Dallas policemen who raided their apartment while searching for a suspect in the murders of three other Dallas policemen on February 15, 1971, which became known as the Trinity River Massacre.

Medrano paid Thomas Rodriguez's bond. At a vigil held for the family on March 6, Medrano explained that outside pressure discouraging people from attending the vigil, fear, and not knowing that people could take a stand for their rights resulted in fewer than 100 attendees at the vigil. According to Medrano, church groups and Mexican-American organizations had been urged to attend the vigil and to visit the Rodriguez family to no avail. Instead, the first visitors and supporters of the Rodriguez family were members of the Southern Christian Leadership Conference. Mexican-American Progressive Association member Frances Arredondo echoed his statements on the community being too afraid to take action. Later reports disputed Medrano's report that no church members or representatives visited the Rodriguez family.

State Representative Paul Moreno of El Paso arrived in Dallas on March 11 to show his support for the Rodriguez family and hold a press conference with the community. In an article regarding his visit, Medrano was quoted as urging the community to vote against members of the Citizens Charter Association, an organization that worked closely with Dallas businesses and politicians. Medrano claimed that Dallas Sheriff Clarence Jones was not listening to the community and continued to ignore requests to discuss problems with the community. He reached out to the office of Senator Birch Bayh, who then became involved in addressing police violence against Mexican Americans in Texas. Bayh received allegations of shootings in Brownsville, Pharr, San Antonio, and Dallas, and stated that there was a need for a thorough and impartial investigation of the reported incidents by the Department of Justice.

On March 21, Medrano directed a march during the Shrine Spring Parade in support of the Rodriguez family. Around 200 marchers participated. Throughout the ensuing actions taken after the shooting, Medrano worked to build interracial solidarity, and worked with Dallas leaders such as Al Lipscomb and Ed Polk.

=== Shooting of Santos Rodriguez ===
Following the police shooting of Santos Rodriguez in 1973, Medrano became active in community responses and protests in Santos' memory. Medrano directed crowds at the Reverchon Park rally held in honor of Santos in 1978. At the rally, he addressed the crowd as a representative of the UAW, applauding the community response to the rally and noting that Santos' name would live on.

=== Statewide activities ===
In January 1975, Medrano became a member of the executive committee of the newly-formed Tejano Political Action Committee (Tex-PAC). The Austin-based group was led by Leonel J. Castillo, Comptroller of the City of Houston. The purpose of the group was to promote equal-opportunity legislation and educate members of the Mexican-American community of the importance of political involvement.

== Personal life ==
Medrano's father, Sabas Medrano, died sometime in his thirties in circumstances unknown to his family. Medrano recounted in an oral history interview that his father was allegedly arrested by Dallas police officers behind a fire station on Laws and McKinney Streets, near where Medrano was born. The family never saw Sabas again, and at the time of the interview, did not know where he was buried. Medrano's mother went on to marry a man named Pedro Centeno.

Pancho Medrano married Esperanza Jimenez, and they had five children: Francisco Jr., Roberto, Ricardo, Rolando, and Pauline. Roberto served as a Dallas ISD trustee for 13 years until he lost an election in 1986. Ricardo was on the Dallas City Council from 1979 to 2003, and served as president of the Dallas Brown Berets for a time. Pauline was on the council from 2005 to 2013. She served as Dallas Mayor Pro Tem from 2011 to 2013, and is a graduate of University of Texas at Arlington. Rolando is also a graduate of UT Arlington, and earned his master's degree from Southern Methodist University. The children were often brought into political activities since their childhood, and political activities became family affairs. Francisco Jr.'s son, Adam Medrano, was elected to the Dallas City Council District 2 seat in 2013, and serves as Mayor Pro Tem.

Several of Medrano's children and peers were interviewed by Texas Christian University for a project called Civil Rights in Black and Brown, and spoke of his story and legacy. Dallas ISD's Francisco "Pancho" Medrano Middle School is named after him.

Medrano died on April 4, 2002. The funeral was at Gonzáles Funeral Home, rosary at the Hall of State in Fair Park, and services at Cathedral Santuario de Guadalupe, 2215 Ross Ave. He was buried at Calvary Hill Cemetery and Mausoleum in Dallas.
