= Latino Cultural Center =

Coordinates: 32°47′16″N 96°47′23″W

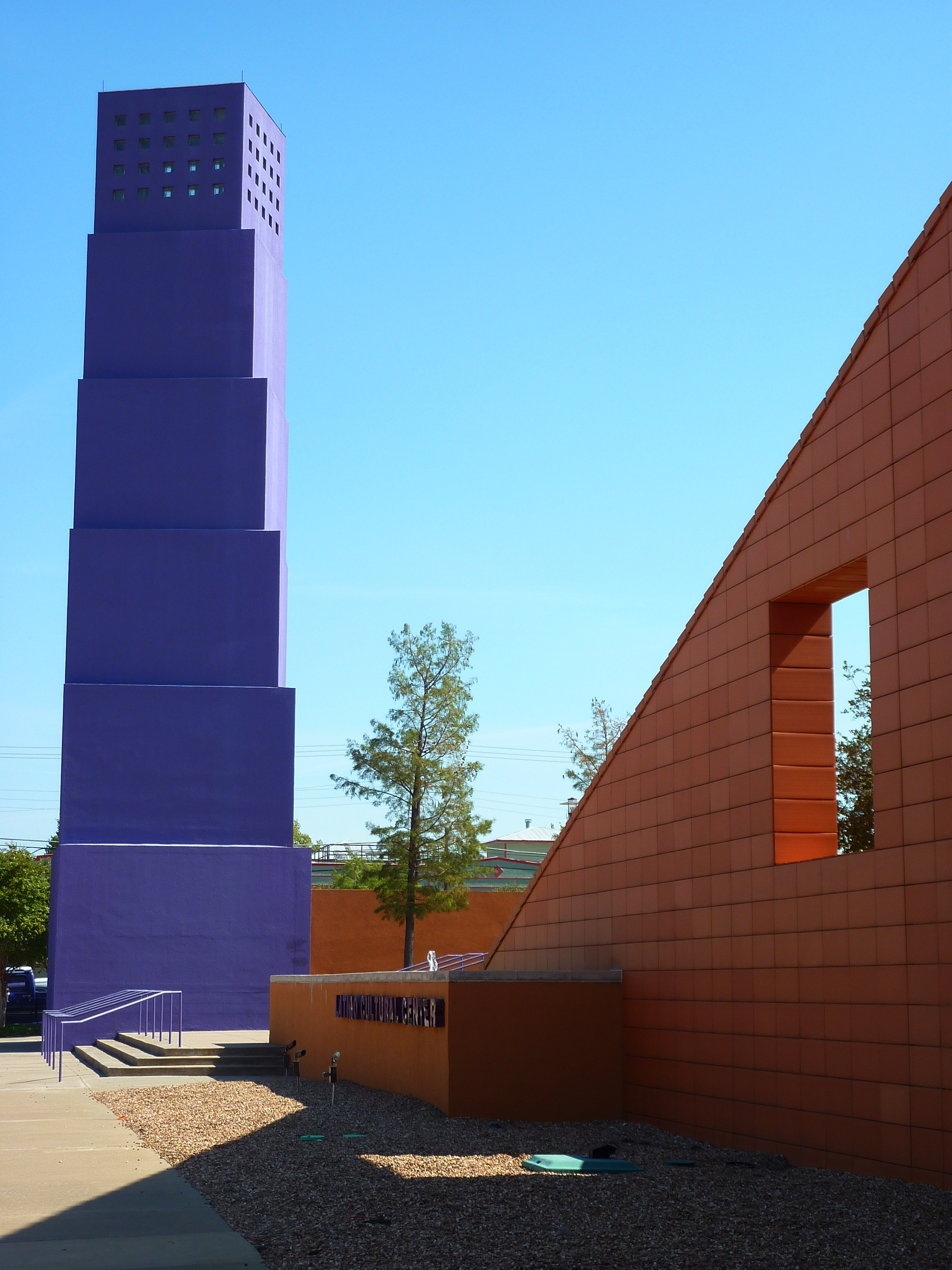
Latino Cultural Center, Dallas.

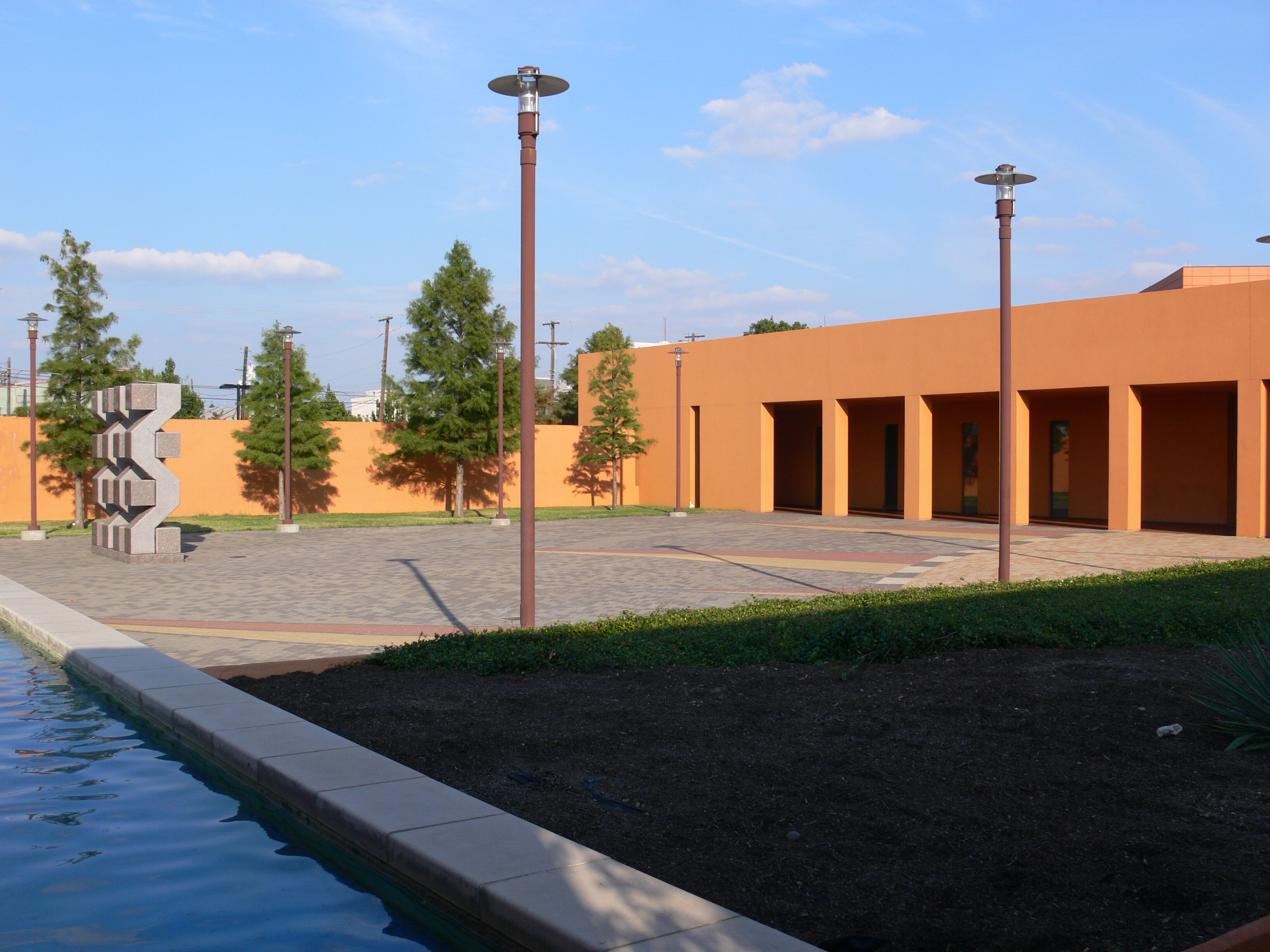
Latino Cultural Center, Dallas

The Latino Cultural Center in Dallas, Texas serves as a regional catalyst for the preservation, development, and promotion of Latino and Hispanic arts and culture.

The 27,000-square-foot (2,500 m^{2}) facility, known for its vivid colors and solid exteriors, was designed by architect Ricardo Legorreta and opened in 2003. It contains a 300-seat theater, a multi-purpose room, an art gallery and sculpture courtyards that are widely used by local, regional, and international artists.

The City of Dallas Office of Cultural Affairs (OCA) operates the cultural center and supports educational classes and events for children, adults, and families that take place throughout the year.
