= Little Mexico =

Former neighborhood in Dallas, Texas

Little Mexico is a former neighborhood in Dallas, Texas, encompassing the area bordered by Maple Avenue, McKinney Avenue and the MKT (Missouri, Kansas, Texas) Railroad. Formerly a Polish Jewish neighborhood, it was settled by a wave of Mexican immigrants beginning about 1910, and was recognized as Little Mexico by 1919, becoming a center of a Mexican-American community life in the city that lasted into the early 1980s, with a peak of population in the 1960s. Pike Park and a few structures are the remnants of the historic neighborhood, redeveloped as Uptown, including the Arts and West End Districts.

== Origins ==
Established as an area of Polish Jewish immigrants, who arrived beginning in the late 19th century, the neighborhood began to attract Mexican immigrants, who arrived after the defeat of President Porfirio Diaz and his government and the start of the Mexican Revolution (1910–1921). Mexicans immigrants from all walks of life came to the Dallas area to take jobs in factories, agriculture, and particularly the railroads, which significantly expanded in Dallas after 1900 and provided work opportunities for immigrants. In a process of ethnic succession, as the former mostly Jewish population moved out, Mexicans replaced them. The area between Lamar and Akard streets and Ross and McKinney Avenue had low-cost housing and stricter laws regarding legalized vices, making the area less desirable for local Dallas residents but more obtainable for recent immigrants. They had a continuing immigration and increased in population. By 1919, the area was known as "Little Mexico." A Dallas Morning News article defined the area as "[t]he entire district bounded by Cochran and Payne streets and the Missouri, Kansas & Texas tracks and taking in the vast districts on lower Ross and McKinney avenues."

== Living conditions ==
Housing became scarce in this area in the 1920s and 1930s as more Mexicans poured into Little Mexico. Railroad workers were allowed to set up house in abandoned railroad cars, and houses were built on all available land. Yards and play areas were luxuries which the new residents could not afford. Many houses were quickly built with scrap wood and tar paper, and the city left the streets unpaved. The Dallas County Relief Board prepared the "Blighted Area Survey of Dallas" in 1935, and showed that the neighborhood only had access to cold water, and that 3/4 of the population of Little Mexico lived without indoor plumbing, private baths, or gas. These issues were exacerbated by the fact that 95% of those living in Little Mexico were renters, and financially unable to improve their living conditions. According to the 1940s United States Census, 50% of homes lacked running water, and 65% burned wood, kerosene and gasoline for heat.

The families did not have access to medical care, and poor conditions led to a high mortality rate. Children did not get the vaccines available at the time. Families relied on home remedies and old folk customs, some of which worked. Francisco Pancho Medrano (1920–2002) tells of cutting his foot as a boy and his mother sending others for cobwebs from under the house to help stop the bleeding. As years passed and Dallas expanded, it extended paved roads and infrastructure to Little Mexico. However, it continued to be a low-income area as the housing was substandard. People who improved their lot tended to move out. In the 1950s redevelopment began to occur and older houses were torn down and replaced.

== Education ==
In the 1940s U.S. Census of the 2,284 residents of Little Mexico, 77% had no more than six years of education. The city excluded Hispanic children from white schools. The children of Little Mexico attended Benito Juarez, Travis, Cumberland Hills and Crozier Technical High School in the Dallas Independent School District, as well as St. Ann’s School, run by the Catholic Diocese. Both Travis and Cumberland Hills were built in the 1890s and were not well-maintained, as the city tended to underfund minority schools. By the 1950s, it had 95%–100% Mexican-American students. In the 1950's the Baptist goodwill Center in the neighborhood provided kindergarten for 4 year and 5 year olds. It was one of the earliest early education provided in Dallas. In April 1955, Travis Elementary burned to the ground, and all students were transferred to Cumberland Hills, also in poor condition. Mrs. Woodall Rodgers, wife of the former Dallas mayor, learned about the conditions and reported it in a newspaper article exposing the conditions. In 1958 a new Travis Elementary was built with the latest amenities available at the time, including a gym. As most Mexican Americans were Catholic, many parents sent their children to St. Ann’s, where the Church kept tuition was low for the working-class neighborhood. Though most girls were kept out of school, St. Ann’s opened a commercial school for girls in 1946.

== Pike Park ==
Pike Park is considered the heart of Little Mexico. It is almost the only remaining element of the historic neighborhood and was designated a Dallas Historic Landmark in 1981. It opened in 1912 as Summit Play Park and renamed Pike Park in July 1927, after the late charter member of the park board Edgar L. Pike. It was the site of the first Dieciséis de Septiembre festivities in Dallas in September 1926, and grew to be the cultural and holiday celebration center of the neighborhood. The park was racially segregated for normal use: metal rails were built to keep Mexican-American and African-American children from playing in the park. The Mexican Consul worked with the city of Dallas to arrange for limited access to the Pike Park swimming pool. Mexican-American children were only allowed to swim in the morning, and the pool would be emptied by staff and cleaned by Mexican-American and African-American children so that new water could be put in for white children. In 1931 the City of Dallas enacted an ordinance that enforced joint use of the park. In 1978 it was thoroughly renovated in a $400,000 project by the City of Dallas Parks and Recreation Department. A gazebo, styled similarly to one in Monterrey, Mexico, was added, as was a Mexican-style tiled roof and stucco façade to the park building. In 1985 a reunion of former residents and descendants of Little Mexico was held, and more than 1,000 persons attended. Today its legacy is continued by the Pike Park Preservation League.

The park has been used as a rallying place for Mexican Americans to gather in various civil rights demonstrations. On July 24, 1973 at 3:00 am, Dallas Police knocked on the door of David and Santos Rodriguez. The 13-year-old and 12-year-old were wanted for questioning related to the burglary of $8 from a soda machine. While Officer Darrell Cain and his partner questioned the brothers in the back of their police car, Cain put his .357 caliber revolver up to Santos’ head and fired, killing the 12-year-old. Three days later, activists marched from Pike Park in protest of Officer Cain’s having been given $3,000 bail. Officer Cain was later sentenced to 5 years in jail by an all-white jury in Austin. He said that he thought the revolver was empty.

== Discrimination ==
Immigrants from Mexico included soldiers, business men and poor peasants. Middle-class immigrants suffered culture shock as they were suddenly qualified for only low-paying jobs and suffered social discrimination. Before the Civil Rights Act of 1964 and Voting Rights Act of 1965, Dallas, like most of the South, was racially segregated, and state law disfranchised black people. Blacks and whites attended different schools; blacks could not eat at lunch counters in retail stores or white-only restaurants, or use dressing rooms in stores that solicited their business; they were restricted to the backs of buses.

While not legally segregated, Mexican Americans suffered considerable discrimination, and were suppressed as second-class citizens. Woolworth's and other noted retail stores had their clerks tell Mexican Americans they were not welcome when they entered. The local park (Pike Park) was not open to Mexicans until 1931. Francisco Pancho Medrano (1920–2002) remembers as a child being allowed to swim in its pool only early in the day. It was cold then, and it was before the pool was drained from the previous day and refilled with fresh water, reserved for White swimmers. High school students from Little Mexico were “highly encouraged” to attend Crozier Technical High School, nicknamed “Taco Tech,” rather than pursue academic studies. Pauline Castillo Lozano (1903–2000) recalled moving out of Little Mexico in the 1940s. She let her new neighbors in a predominantly White neighborhood assume she was the maid for her lighter-skinned husband and adopted white daughter.

== Businesses ==
The earliest businesses developed in Little Mexico were groceries, and were followed by bakeries, barber shops, shoe shops, and bookstores. The Greater Dallas Hispanic Chamber of Commerce was originally established in this neighborhood in 1939 with the purpose of developing, promoting, and creating local businesses. Businesses that developed in Little Mexico have become staples of Dallas, such as El Fenix, Luna’s Tortilla Factory, and Dallas Tortilla Factory.

Miguel 'Mike' Martinez Sr., immigrated to Dallas from Hacienda del Portero, Nuevo Leon, Mexico in 1911. He worked as a railroad laborer and later a dishwasher at the Oriental Hotel in Dallas, which was located at the corner of Commerce and Akard streets. According to family lore, he became a temporary chef at the Oriental Hotel when the hotel chef was called away on an emergency, and was such a good cook that he was fired from working at the hotel in order to protect the original chef's job. He established his restaurant, the Martinez Cafe, on Griffin St. and McKinney Ave., changing the name to El Fenix in 1918. The restaurant holds the claim to the first Mexican plate served in restaurants: Mr. Martinez served different dishes of food on one plate in order to save on dish washing, creating a new restaurant tradition. In the 1950s and 1960s, the restaurant became a traditional after-prom tradition for local Latinos. Mr. Martinez died in February, 1956, while he was visiting his hometown in Mexico and working on civic improvements to the city. El Fenix is still family-owned and operated, and has expanded to additional locations throughout North Texas.

Maria Luna was a young widow who came to the U.S. from San Luis Potosi with her two children, and became an early entrepreneur in the Barrio. Luna’s Tortilla Factory was started by Maria Luna in 1924 at 2209 Caroline St., and later moved to 1615 McKinney Ave before moving to its current address at Connector Dr. She began her business as a cottage industry, delivering buckets of masa to housewives to make tortillas, but after a year and a half of work, she was able to hire 25 women to work in her small factory and delivered tortillas to the neighborhood in her 1925 Ford Model T. In 1925, the factory was turning out 500 dozen tortillas a day. By 2013, more than 1,500 dozen tortillas were made by the factory, which was operated by Maria Luna's grandson Fernando Luna.

In 1950 the Dallas Tortilla Factory was founded by Ruben Leal, Sr. and his wife Elvira. With a handful of recipes, they started making a name with their now-famous tamales, along with other Mexican favorites, such as menudo (beef tripe soup), barbacoa, lengua and freshly made tortillas. They instantly became the talk of the barrio. They were visited by such celebrities as Larry Hagman and his co-star Linda Gray of the TV hit series, Dallas, boxer champion Salvador Sanchez, and actor Brad Pitt.

== Sports ==
Baseball was played in Little Mexico, which was affectionately called El Barrio. Teams from local schools would play other teams in tournaments from North Texas Mexican neighborhoods. Boxing became popular as a way to keep boys out of trouble. In 1953 in the basement of the Pike Park building, Mike “Nino” Rodriguez started training boys to box.

== Culture ==
Music played throughout Little Mexico festivities, with influences from Latin, Puerto Rican and Cuban sounds. Singer Trini Lopez cut his first record here in 1958. Religious plays and Las Posadas were acted out at the local schools, churches, and at Pike Park. Fiestas for Diez y Seis de Septiembre and Cinco de Mayo attracted crowds to Pike Park. People cared for the sick and poor in the community, and life centered on the local churches and organizations. Our Lady of Guadalupe church was established in 1924.

== Demise ==
Little Mexico flourished to its peak in the early 1960s. Unlike the similar neighborhood of East Los Angeles, Little Mexico was land-locked by major highways and surrounding neighborhoods which made it unable to expand geographically. The Dallas North Tollway began construction in 1966, and cut straight through the middle of Little Mexico; the Woodall Rodgers Freeway bounded the neighborhood on the south side. The end of segregation, combined with highway construction and suburbanization, led to wealthier Mexican Americans moving to improved housing in "better" areas of Dallas. As Downtown business expanded, Little Mexico became prime real estate for redevelopment for office space. The city expanded streets into and through the area, high-rises were built, and the city bought houses through eminent domain to clear the area for redevelopment, forcing renters out.

Today only a few low structures and Pike Park remain of the historic Little Mexico. They are in the shadow of Downtown, luxury apartments and the American Airlines Center, which hosts the Dallas Stars hockey team and Dallas Mavericks basketball team.

== See also ==
- History of Mexican Americans in Dallas-Fort Worth
- The Dallas Public Library, Dallas History and Archives Division

== Sources ==
- Garcia, Yolette and Leal, Rick (Authors) Garcia, Yolette (Executive Producer). (1997). Little Mexico-El Barrio [VHS]. Dallas: KERA. Retrieved from http://catalog.dallaslibrary.org/Polaris/search/searchresults.aspx?ctx=1.1033.0.0.6&type=Keyword&term=Little%20Mexico&by=KW&sort=RELEVANCE&limit=TOM=vcr&query=&page=0#__pos1
- Bailon, Gilbert. (1991). Little Mexico : an enduring hub of Mexican culture in Dallas. Dallas Public Library. Retrieved from http://catalog.dallaslibrary.org/Polaris/search/searchresults.aspx?ctx=1.1033.0.0.6&type=Keyword&term=Little%20Mexico&by=KW&sort=RELEVANCE&limit=TOM=bks&query=&page=0#__pos3
- Flick, David. (2007, August 7). Little Mexico almost gone. The Dallas Morning News. Retrieved from http://www.dallasnews.com/sharedcontent/dws/news/dmn/stories/080707dnmetlittlemexico.368b768.html
- Merten, Sam. (2008, January 31). Little Mexico Gets Squeezed Out. Dallas Observer News. Retrieved from http://www.dallasobserver.com/2008-01-31/news/squeeze-play/
- Horner, Kim. (2006, September 22). Residents split on possible sale. The Dallas Morning News. Retrieved from http://www.dallasnews.com/sharedcontent/dws/classifieds/news/homecenter/condos/stories/class092206dnmetlittlemexico.6206a99.html
- Merten, Sam. (2008, February 4). Little Mexico Is Getting Smaller One House at a Time. Dallas Observer Blogs. Retrieved from http://blogs.dallasobserver.com/unfairpark/2008/02/little_mexico_is_getting_small.php
- Simnacher, Joe. (2009, February 14). Socorro Navarro Hernandez: Helped run grocery store in Dallas' Little Mexico for decades. The Dallas Morning News. Retrieved from http://www.dallasnews.com/sharedcontent/dws/news/localnews/stories/DNhernandezob_14met.ART.State.Edition1.4c2ec6a.html
- Jacobson, Sherry. (2006, October 14). Selling Little Mexico could come at a cost. The Dallas Morning News. Retrieved from http://www.dallasnews.com/sharedcontent/dws/dn/localnews/columnists/sjacobson/stories/DN-jacobson_14met.ART0.North.Edition1.3e6a544.html
- Olivera, Mercedes. (2009, October 17). Little Mexico photo exhibit given more time to share memories. The Dallas Morning News. http://www.dallasnews.com/sharedcontent/dws/dn/localnews/columnists/molivera /stories/DNolivera_17met.ART.State.Edition1.4c1d8f2.html
- Preservation Dallas. (June 3, 2008). 2008 Dallas 11 Most Endangered Historic Places. Retrieved from https://web.archive.org/web/20100308220751/http://www.preservationdallas.org/new_site/issues/mostEndangered-08.php
- Betzen, Bill. (August 3, 2008). Little Mexico, Dallas, Texas. Retrieved from http://www.studentmotivation.org/littlemexico/index.htm
- Dallas Public Library. (2006). Texas/Dallas History & Archives. Retrieved from http://www.dallaslibrary2.org/texas/photogallery/lost.html#little
- Dallas Historical Society. (January 16, 2009). Dallas History Items: St. Ann's School, 1940 Retrieved from https://web.archive.org/web/20071222205424/http://www.dallashistory.org/history/dallas/st_anns.htm
- Google. History of Little Mexico Dallas. Retrieved from http://www.google.com/searchq=history+of+little+mexico+dallas&hl=en&rlz=1T4GGLL_enUS332US332&tbs=tl:1&tbo=u&ei=Vv8nTOKlK8P78Aae-pTSDw&sa=X&oi=timeline_result&ct=title&resnum=11&ved=0CEQQ5wIwCg
- Researched and started in June 2010 by Marco C. Rodriguez
