= Walnut Hill station (DART) =

DART rail station in Dallas, Texas

Walnut Hill
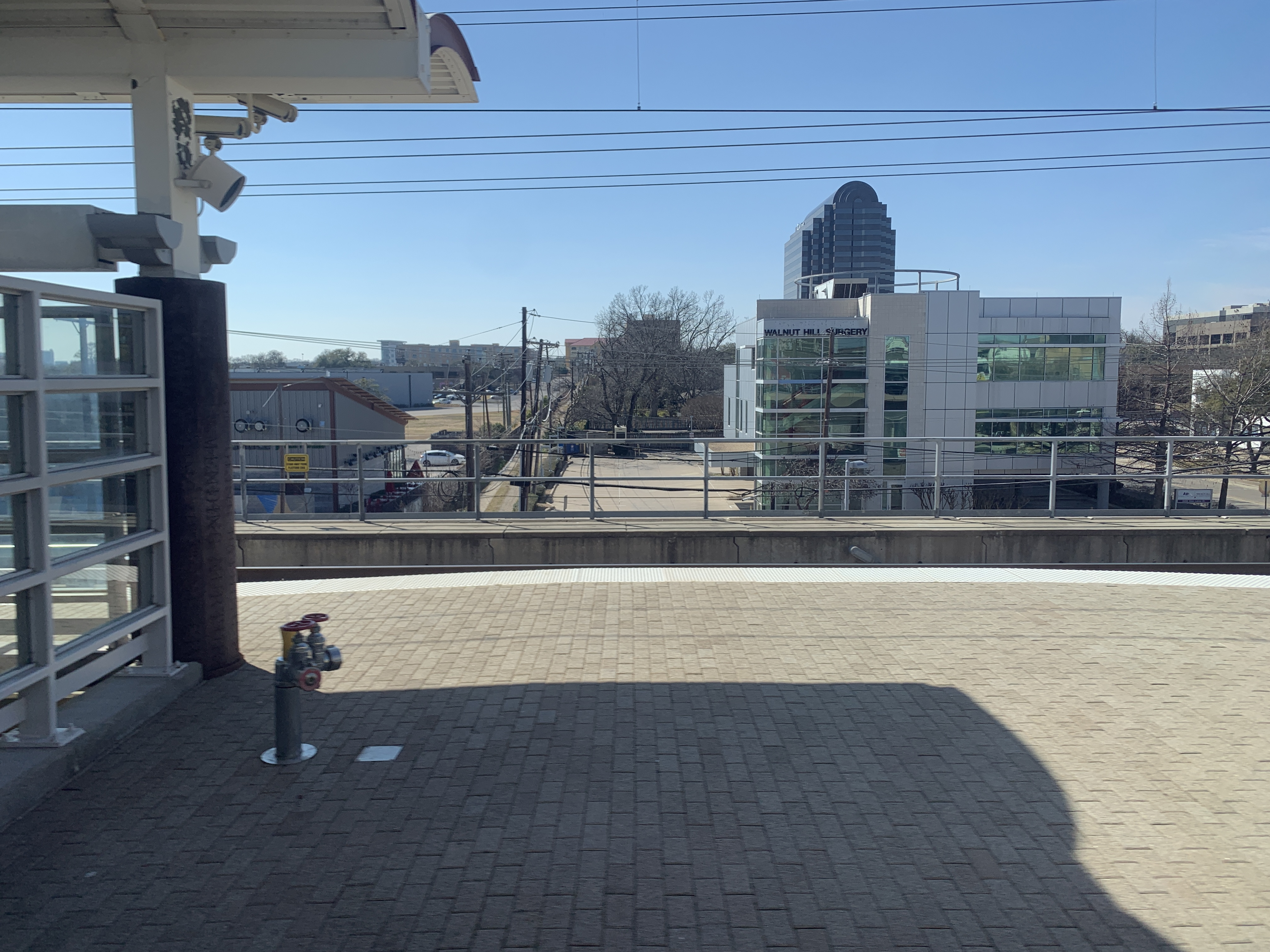

General information
- Location: 8150 Walnut Hill Lane; Dallas, Texas 75231
- Coordinates: 32°52′57″N 96°45′54″W
- System: DART rail
- Owner: Dallas Area Rapid Transit
- Platforms: Elevated island
- Connections: DART: 27, North Central Dallas GoLink Zone (M-Sun), North Dallas GoLink Zone (M-Sun), Preston Hollow GoLink Zone (M-Sun)

Construction
- Parking: 170 spaces
- Cycle facilities: 3 bike lockers, 1 bike rack
- Accessible: Yes

History
- Opened: July 1, 2002

Services
| Preceding station | DART | Following station |
|---|---|---|
| Park Lane toward Westmoreland | Red Line | Forest Lane toward Parker Road |
| Park Lane toward DFW Airport Terminal A | Orange Line | Forest Lane toward LBJ/Central or Parker Road |
Location

Walnut Hill station is a DART rail station in Dallas, Texas. It is served by the Red Line and the Orange Line. The elevated station is located at the intersection of Walnut Hill Lane and Manderville Lane, roughly halfway between North Central Expressway (US 75) and Greenville Avenue, with exits on both the northern and southern sides of Walnut Hill Lane.

The station serves the northern portions of the Vickery Meadow neighborhood, including Texas Health Presbyterian Hospital and the mixed-use development The Hill.

In tribute to the hospital, the station's columns are decorated with health-related words, and the station contains four pendulums representing that "time heals". The façade was created by local artist Linnea Glatt as part of DART's Station Art & Design Program.

== History ==
Walnut Hill station opened on July 1, 2002, as part of the Red Line's second expansion. The station is one of four elevated stations in the expansion, alongside Spring Valley, Forest Lane, and a rebuilt Park Lane.

At opening, Walnut Hill had no passenger parking, as it was considered a "destination" station, though a 200-space parking lot was proposed. In 2005, following a spike in ridership as a result of high gas prices, DART announced plans to add a parking lot for the station by the end of 2006, with a lot appearing north of Glen Lakes Drive.
