= Forest Lane station =

DART rail station in northeastern Dallas, Texas

Forest Lane
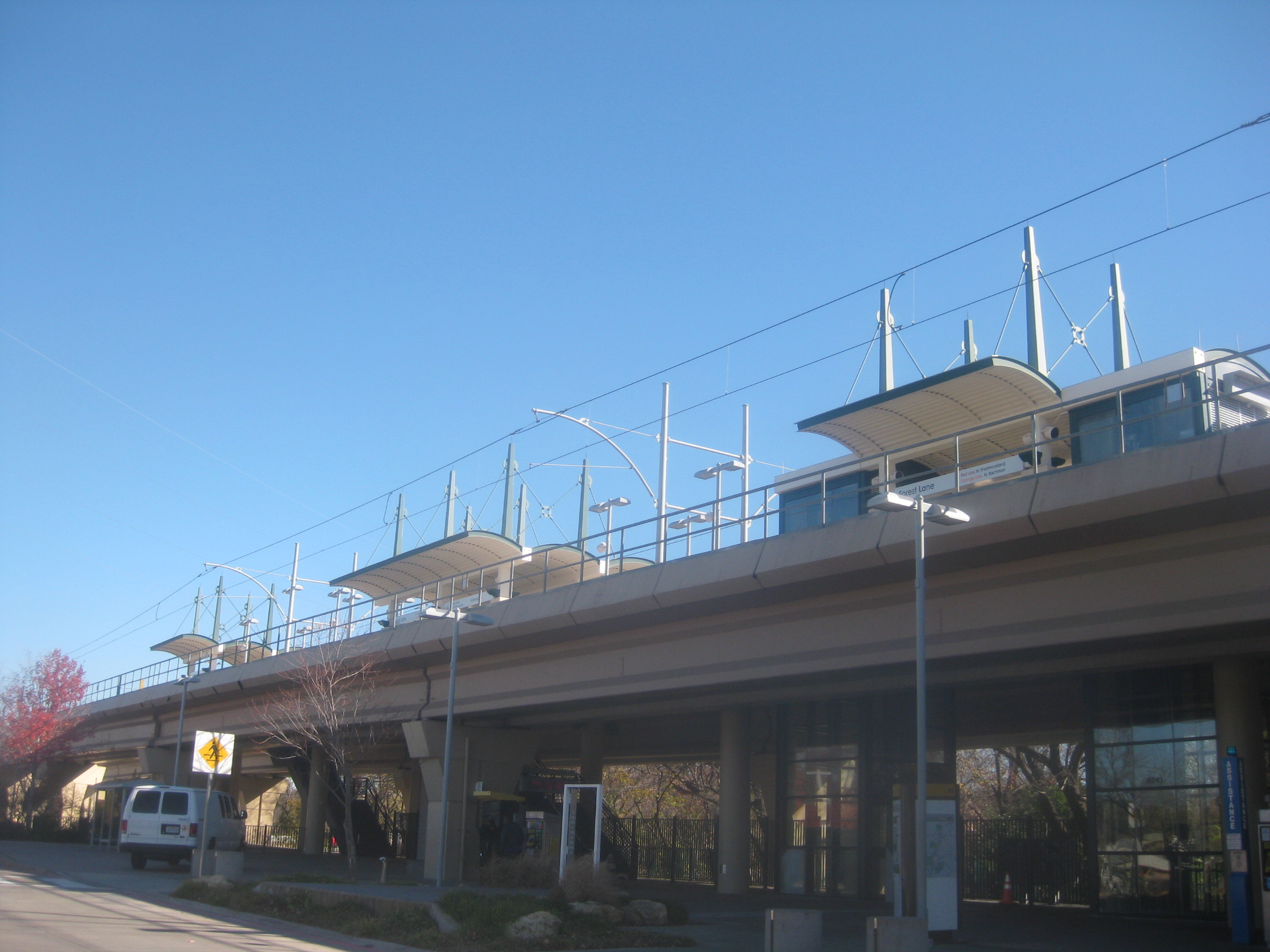

General information
- Location: 8210 Forest Lane; Dallas, Texas
- Coordinates: 32°54′31″N 96°45′42″W
- System: DART rail
- Owner: Dallas Area Rapid Transit
- Platforms: Island platform
- Tracks: 2
- Connections: DART: 22, 241, North Central Dallas GoLink Zone (M-Sun), North Dallas GoLink Zone (M-Sun), Preston Hollow GoLink Zone (M-Sun)

Construction
- Structure type: Elevated
- Parking: 253 spaces
- Cycle facilities: 4 lockers, 1 rack
- Accessible: Yes

History
- Opened: July 1, 2002

Services
Preceding station	DART	Following station
Walnut Hill toward Westmoreland	Red Line	LBJ/Central toward Parker Road
Walnut Hill toward DFW Airport Terminal A	Orange Line (peak-hour only)	LBJ/Central toward Parker Road
Walnut Hill toward DFW Airport Terminal A	Orange Line	LBJ/Central Terminus
Location

Forest Lane station is a DART rail station in northeastern Dallas, Texas. The elevated station, which serves the Red Line and Orange Line, is located on Forest Lane, 1/3 mile (0.54 km) east of North Central Expressway (US 75) and 1 mile (1.6 km) south of Lyndon B. Johnson Freeway (I-635).

The station serves the Medical City Dallas hospital complex, the Cottonwood Trail, and the Hamilton Park neighborhood. In tribute to the largely African-American population of Hamilton Park, the station features a sculpture dedicated to African-Americans who fought against housing segregation.

== History ==
=== North Central Transit Center ===
Northeastern Dallas was originally serviced by the North Central Transit Center, a park-and-ride bus station located between North Central Expressway and Coit Road. The transit center was announced by the Texas Department of Transportation in 1983, several months before DART's formation; it was opened in 1985.

The lot consisted of an air-conditioned waiting area and 1,300 parking spaces. In addition to servicing DART, the center was intended to service Surtran, a municipal bus service connecting Dallas to Dallas/Fort Worth International Airport, but Surtran was discontinued in 1985.

The lot was closed after Forest Lane opened in 2002, with all its bus routes moving to Forest Lane station. The lot was left unused for several years before it was redeveloped; it is currently the location of a Costco store.

=== Forest Lane ===
Forest Lane station opened on July 1, 2002, as part of the Red Line's second major expansion. The Saturday before, an opening ceremony, dubbed "Super Saturday", was held at both the Forest Lane and Arapaho Center stations.

In May 2011, the Cottonwood Trail was extended south from North Central Expressway to the White Rock Creek Trail. The extension included a trailhead at Forest Lane, which was the first trailhead to be located at any DART station.
