= Lovers Lane station =

DART rail station in Dallas, Texas

Lovers Lane
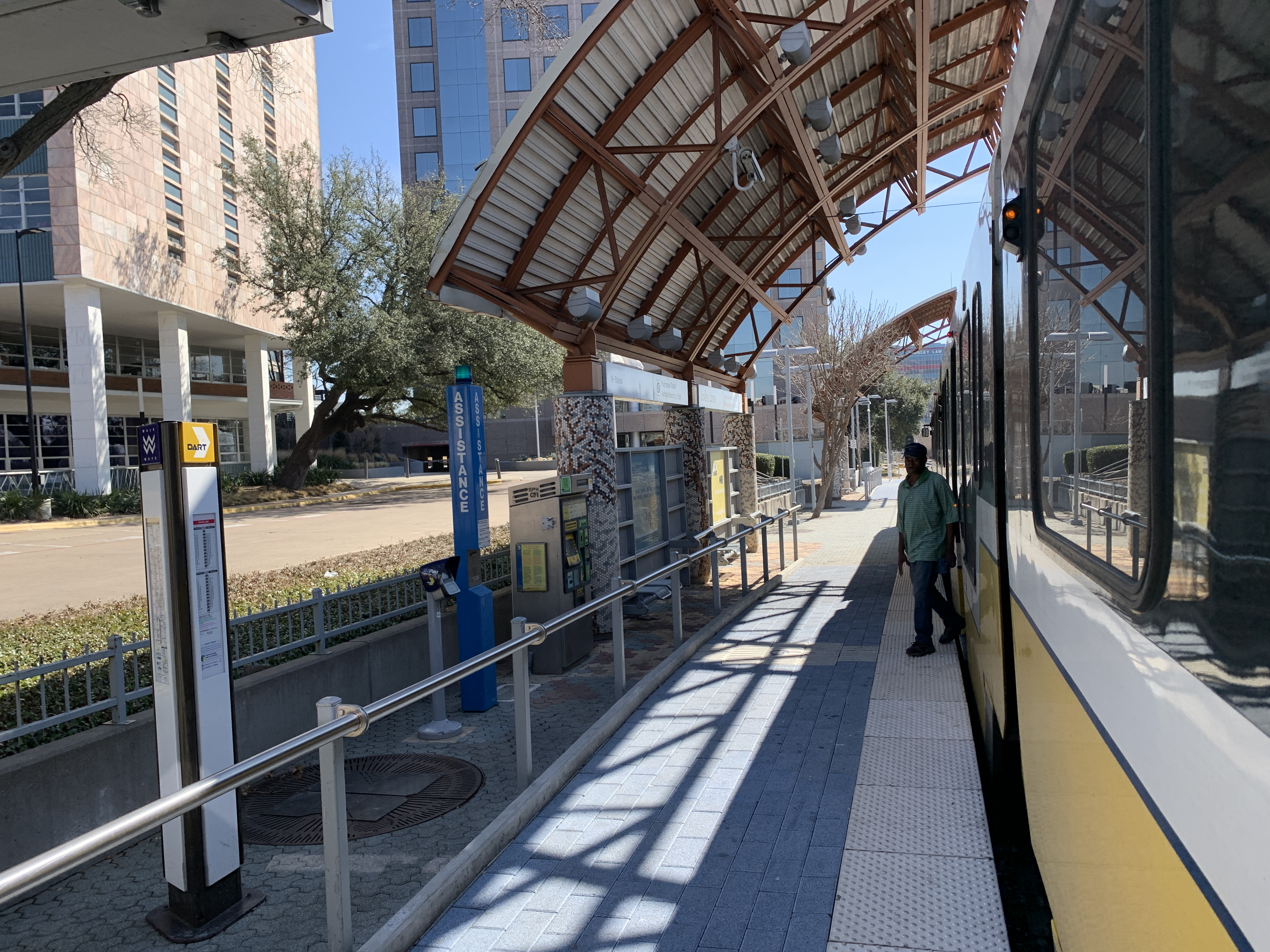

General information
- Location: 5603 Milton Street; Dallas, Texas
- Coordinates: 32°50′55″N 96°46′18″W
- System: DART rail
- Owner: Dallas Area Rapid Transit
- Platforms: Two side platforms

Construction
- Cycle facilities: 1 bike rack
- Accessible: Yes

History
- Opened: January 10, 1997

Services
| Preceding station | DART | Following station |
|---|---|---|
| SMU/Mockingbird toward Westmoreland | Red Line | Park Lane toward Parker Road |
| SMU/Mockingbird toward DFW Airport Terminal A | Orange Line | Park Lane toward LBJ/Central or Parker Road |
Location

Lovers Lane station is a DART rail station in Dallas, Texas. It serves the Red Line and Orange Line. The station is located in East Dallas; it is directly east of North Central Expressway (US 75) and one block south of the intersection of Lovers Lane and Greenville Avenue.

The station services several strip malls along Greenville Avenue, the Energy Square and Meadows Building office complexes, and the residential complex The Village.

Unlike most DART stations, Lovers Lane station does not have a park-and-ride lot. As of June 2024, the station also does not receive bus service, though two bus routes can be accessed from Greenville Avenue one block east of the station entrance.

== History ==
Initial plans for the Lovers Lane station suggested either an at-grade or aerial station, both of which would have an 800-space parking lot and would be located south of an elevated crossing at Lovers Lane. Due to costs, DART chose to remove the parking lot from the plans, which nearly led to the station being rejected by the Dallas City Plan Commission.

As part of DART's Station Art & Design Program, DART installed tile mosaics depicting bois d'arc trees and ten windscreens featuring poems by local poet Robert Trammell. The station opened on January 10, 1997 alongside Mockingbird and Park Lane stations.

At opening, the station was the eastern terminus of a shuttle to Dallas Love Field. The route was eliminated in 2003 in favor of a connection to Downtown Dallas.

In 2008, the city of Dallas established a four-segment tax increment financing district around several DART rail stations. One of the sub-districts consists of land along Greenville Avenue between Lovers Lane and SMU/Mockingbird stations.
