= Convention Center station (DART) =

DART rail station located in Dallas, Texas

Convention Center
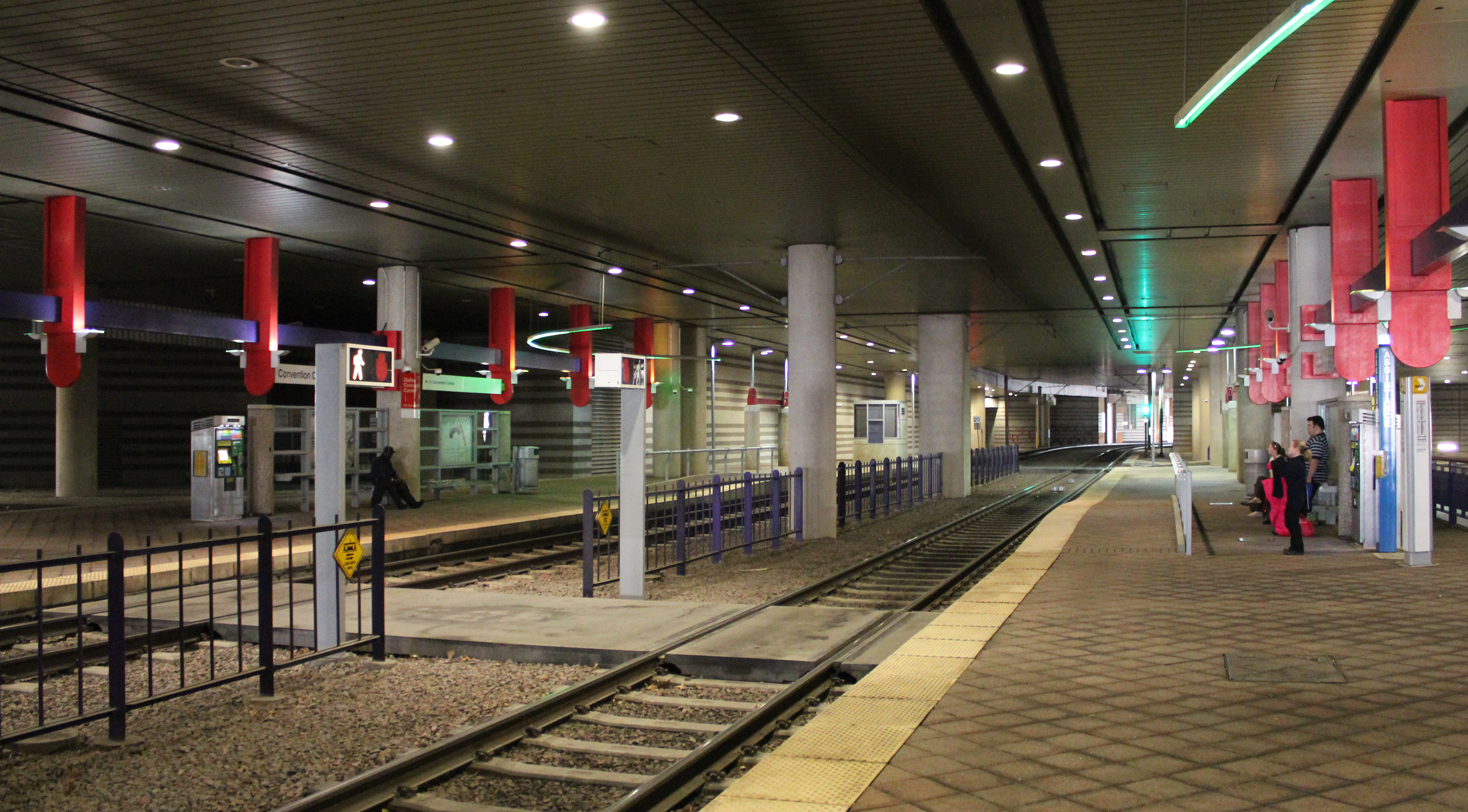

General information
- Location: 727 South Lamar Street; Dallas, Texas
- Coordinates: 32.772649°N 96.802527°W
- System: DART rail
- Owner: Dallas Area Rapid Transit
- Platforms: 2 side platforms
- Tracks: 2
- Connections: DART: 106, 128, 224

Construction
- Structure type: At-grade
- Accessible: Yes

History
- Opened: June 14, 1996
- Closed: January 5, 2026 (will reopen 2029)

Passengers
- FY 2025: 551 (avg. weekday) ▼6.5%

Services
Preceding station	DART	Following station
Cedars toward Westmoreland	Red Line	Union Station toward Parker Road
Cedars toward UNT Dallas	Blue Line	Union Station toward Downtown Rowlett
Location

Convention Center station is a DART rail station located in Downtown Dallas, Texas. Located under the Kay Bailey Hutchison Convention Center at the intersection of Memorial Drive and Lamar Street, the station serves the Convention Center District in southwestern downtown, including the Convention Center itself, the Omni Dallas Hotel, The Black Academy of Arts and Letters, Pioneer Park, Dallas City Hall, and the J. Erik Jonsson Central Library.

The station serves the Red Line and Blue Line. It is the southernmost station located in Downtown Dallas.

Due to a major redevelopment of the convention center, the station is currently closed to the public and will reopen in 2029. Trains still travel through the station but do not stop.

== History ==
Convention Center was an inaugural station for the DART rail system, opening with the Red and Blue lines on June 14, 1996.

In 2018, DART installed two overhead charging stations at the station for short-range electric buses. The electric buses were originally used for DART's downtown circulator route, DLink, which Convention Center served as the terminus for.

In August 2024, DART announced that the station would be closed for an extended period to allow for major renovations to the convention center. The station closed on January 5, 2026 and is planned to reopen in 2029. Buses at the station were moved to either East Transfer Center or to a temporary layover stop at Akard Street and Marilla Street.
