= 8th & Corinth station =

DART rail station in Dallas, Texas

8th & Corinth
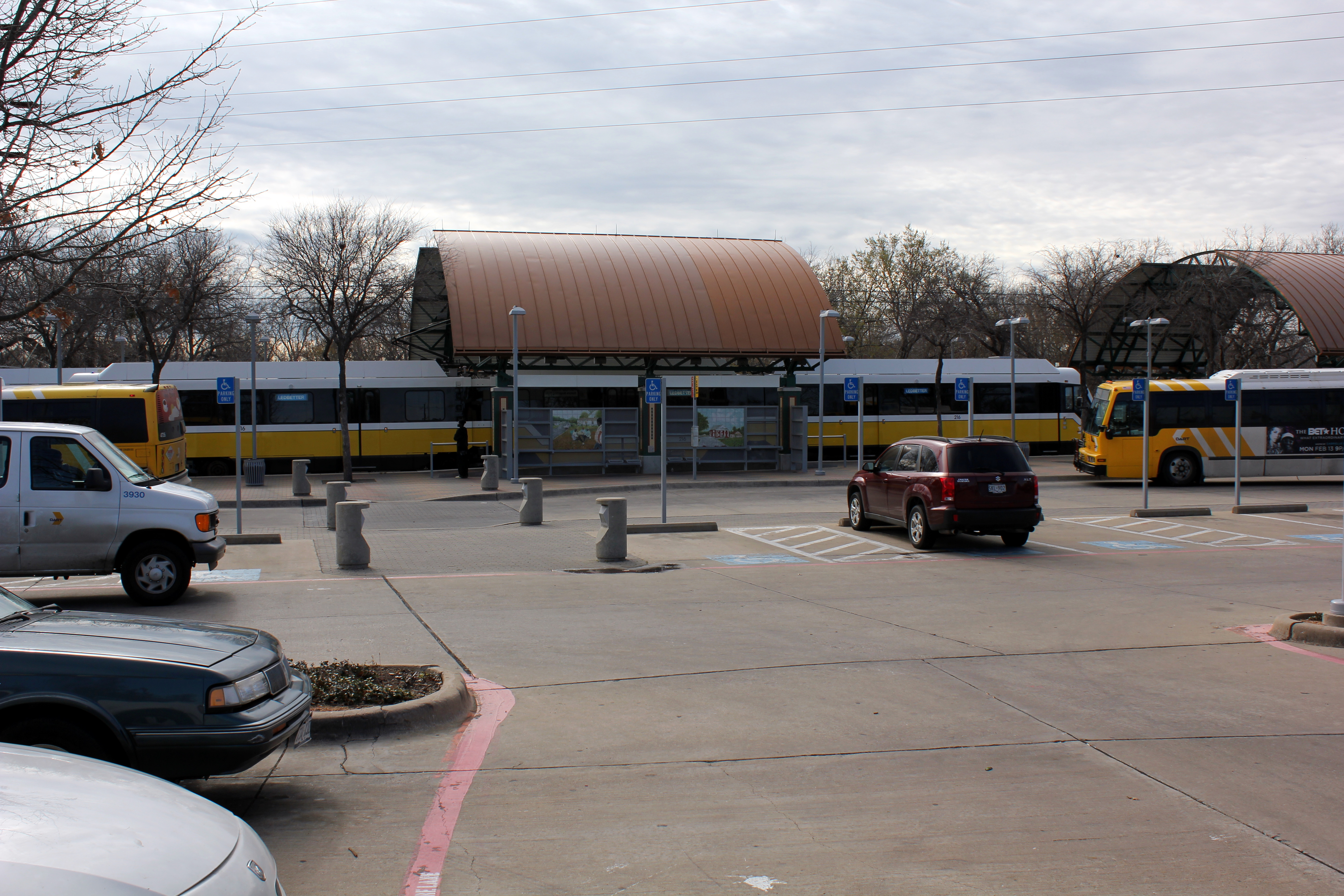

General information
- Location: 1740 East Eighth Street; Dallas, Texas 75203
- Coordinates: 32°44′53″N 96°47′54″W
- System: DART rail
- Owner: Dallas Area Rapid Transit
- Platforms: Two side platforms
- Connections: DART: 215, 217 and 226

Construction
- Parking: 197 spaces, no overnight
- Cycle facilities: Two lockers, one rack
- Accessible: Yes

History
- Opened: June 14, 1996

Services
Preceding station	DART	Following station
Dallas Zoo toward Westmoreland	Red Line	Cedars toward Parker Road
Morrell toward UNT Dallas	Blue Line	Cedars toward Downtown Rowlett
Location

8th & Corinth station is a DART rail station in Dallas, Texas. It is located at the corner of 8th and Corinth Streets in the Oak Cliff neighborhood. It opened on June 14, 1996, and is a station on the Red and Blue Lines, serving Yvonne A. Ewell Townview Center, the West Dallas Industrial Center and surrounding residential and commercial areas.

It is the southernmost station on the DART system serving both the Red and Blue lines, from this point the lines diverge with the Blue line heading south and the Red Line heading southwest. The station provides free parking for passengers, as well as passenger shelters.
