= Dallas Zoo station =

DART rail station located in the Oak Cliff neighborhood of Dallas, Texas

Dallas Zoo
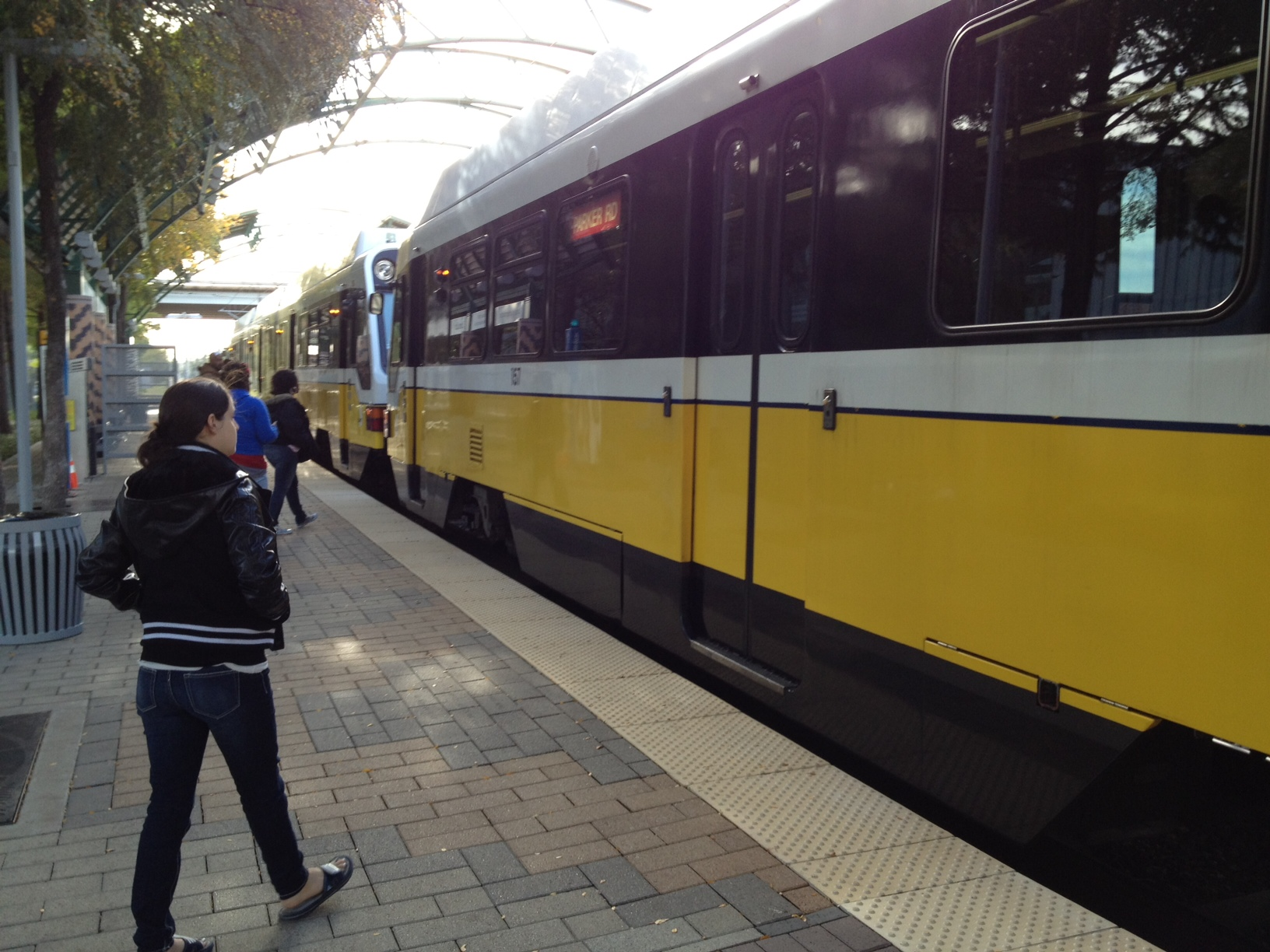

General information
- Location: 614 South Ewing Avenue; Dallas, Texas 75204
- Coordinates: 32°44′26″N 96°48′47″W
- System: DART rail
- Owner: Dallas Area Rapid Transit
- Platforms: Two side platforms
- Connections: DART: 45

Construction
- Parking: Two lockers, one rack
- Accessible: Yes

History
- Opened: June 14, 1996

Services
Preceding station	DART	Following station
Tyler/Vernon toward Westmoreland	Red Line	8th & Corinth toward Parker Road
Location

Dallas Zoo station is a DART rail station located in the Oak Cliff neighborhood of Dallas, Texas (USA) at Ewing Avenue and Clarendon Drive. It opened on June 14, 1996 and is a station on the Red Line, serving the Dallas Zoo and Methodist Dallas Medical Center.
