= Park Lane station (DART) =

DART rail station in northern Dallas, Texas

Park Lane
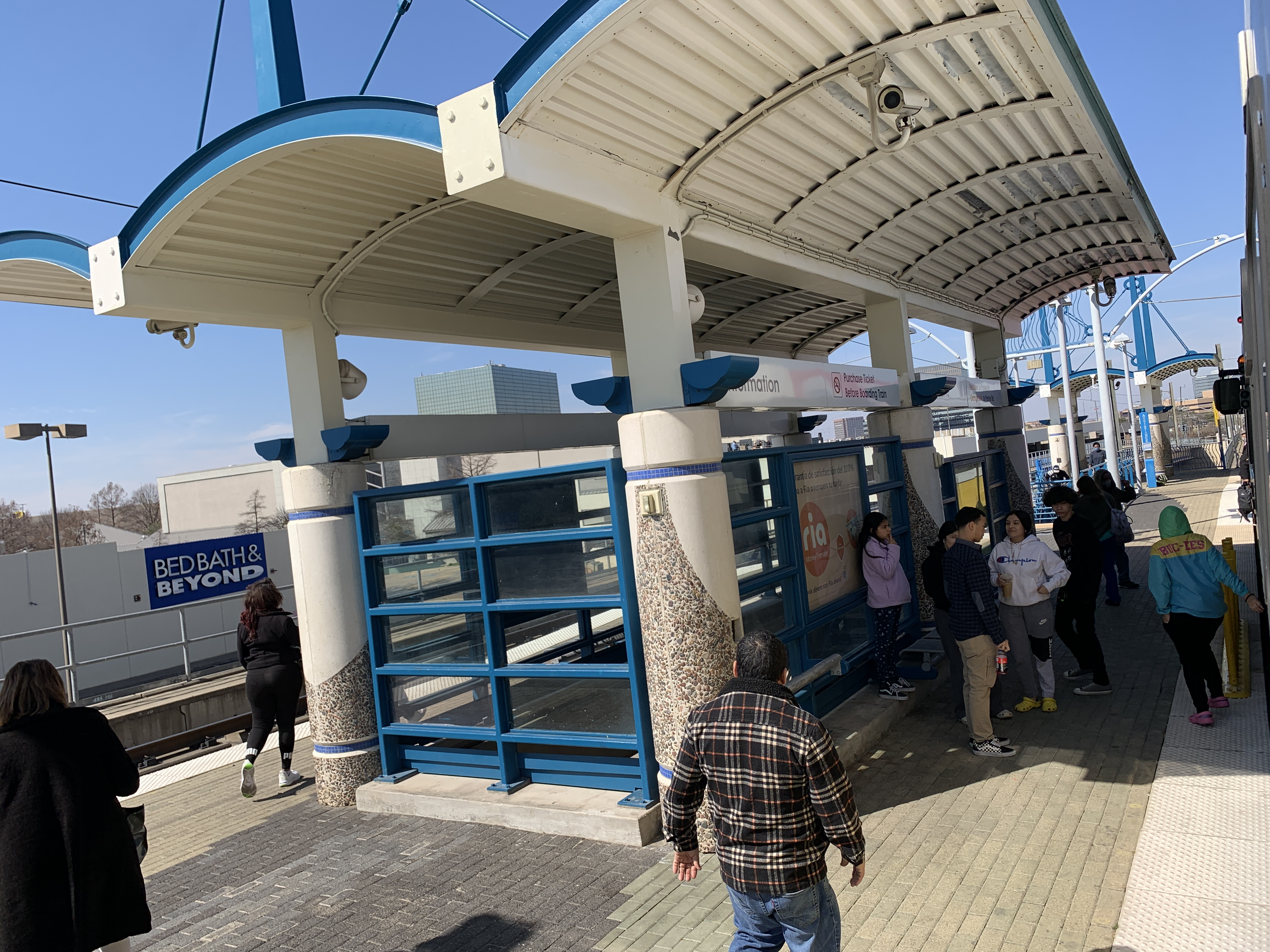

General information
- Location: 8169 Park Lane; Dallas, Texas
- Coordinates: 32°52′22″N 96°45′57″W
- System: DART rail
- Owner: Dallas Area Rapid Transit
- Platforms: Island (elevated)
- Connections: DART: 20, 27, North Central Dallas GoLink Zone (M-Sun), North Dallas GoLink Zone (M-Sun), Preston Hollow GoLink Zone (M-Sun)

Construction
- Parking: 320 spaces
- Cycle facilities: 2 bike lockers, 1 bike rack
- Accessible: Yes

History
- Opened: January 10, 1997 (at-grade)
- Rebuilt: June 17, 2002 (elevated)

Services
Preceding station	DART	Following station
Lovers Lane toward Westmoreland	Red Line	Walnut Hill toward Parker Road
Lovers Lane toward DFW Airport Terminal A	Orange Line	Walnut Hill toward LBJ/Central or Parker Road
Location

Park Lane station is a DART rail station in northern Dallas, Texas. The elevated station is located at the intersection of Park Lane and Greenville Avenue, about 0.2 miles (0.32 km) east of North Central Expressway (US 75). The station serves the Red Line and Orange Line.

The station serves the southern portions of the Vickery Meadow neighborhood, as well as several shopping centers, most notably The Shops at Park Lane and NorthPark Center.

== History ==
Plans for a station on Park Lane date back to 1990 as the northern terminus of a 20-mile (32 km) starter system. Two potential locations for the station were considered: one south of Park Lane near the NorthPark East office complex (since replaced by The Shops at Park Lane), and one north of Park Lane near a (now-closed) United Artists theater. After a 1990 study determined that the line may require grade separation when crossing Park Lane to prevent traffic congestion, DART ultimately chose to build a temporary ground-level platform at the NorthPark East location, which would not require crossing Park Lane until the line was extended further north.

The station opened on January 10, 1997, as the northern terminus of the Red Line. It, along with the Mockingbird and Lovers Lane stations, was originally intended to open 6 months prior, but all stations north of Downtown Dallas were delayed due to issues with a subway tunnel between the Mockingbird and Pearl stations.

Construction on the Red Line's second northern extension, including a bridge over Park Lane and a permanent elevated station, began in April 1999. DART opted to build the new station on the northern side of the road. Local artists Vicki Meek and John Christensen decorated the station with an "urban oasis" theme. It opened to passenger service on June 17, 2002, two weeks before the extension to the Galatyn Park station opened, becoming the first elevated station on the DART rail system.

The original station closed, but DART retains it as a private storage corridor. As of 2024, the original station's platform signage is still present.

In 1997, DART began shuttle service to NorthPark Center, a large mall located on the opposite side of US 75. The shuttle route was discontinued in September 2025 due to falling ridership; DART recommended route 20 or GoLink as a replacement.
