= Dallas Zoo =

Zoo in Dallas, Texas, United States

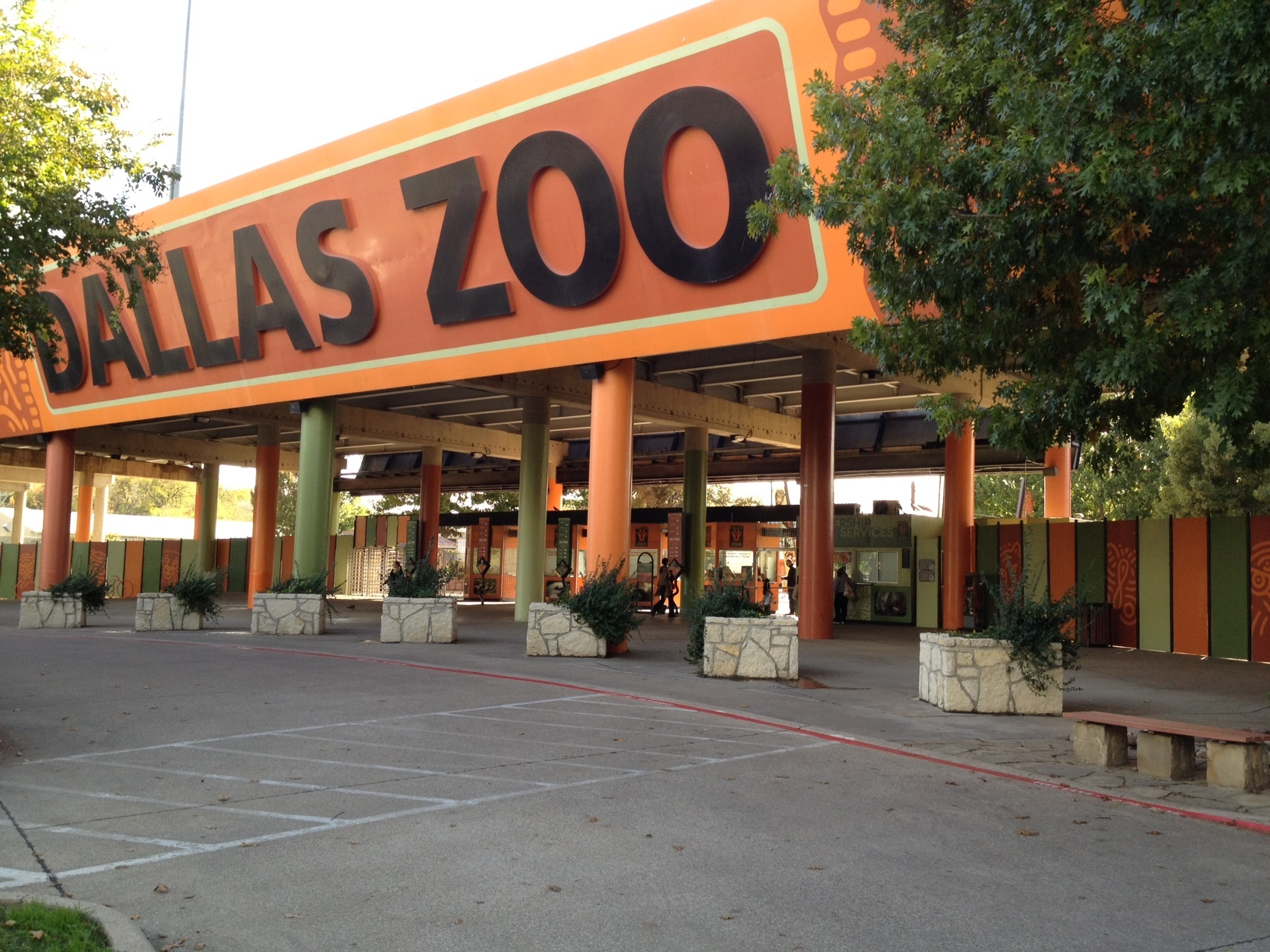
- Entrance to the Dallas Zoo
- Interactive map of Dallas Zoo
- 32°44′24″N 96°48′54″W
- Date opened: 1888
- Location: Dallas, Texas, U.S.
- Land area: 106 acres (43 ha)
- No. of animals: 2,000+
- No. of species: 406
- Annual visitors: 1+ million
- Memberships: AZA, WAZA
- Major exhibits: Gorilla Research Center, Endangered Tiger Habitat, Chimpanzee Forest, Simmons Hippo Outpost, Penguin Cove, Giants of the Savanna
- Public transit: Dallas Area Rapid Transit: Light rail: Red Line at Dallas Zoo Station; Bus route: 45
- Website: www.dallaszoo.com

Dallas Zoo (also called the Dallas Zoological Park) is a 106-acre (43 ha) zoo located 3 mi (5 km) south of downtown Dallas, Texas, in Marsalis Park. Established in 1888, it is the oldest and largest zoological park in Texas and is managed by the non-profit Dallas Zoological Society. It is home to over 2,000 animals representing 406 species. It is an accredited member of the Association of Zoos and Aquariums (AZA), and is a member of the World Association of Zoos and Aquariums (WAZA).

In 2009, the Dallas City Council unanimously approved the construction of the 11 acres (4.5 ha) Giants of the Savanna Exhibit, and also voted to privatize the zoo. In recent years, attendance has surged. In 2015, the zoo achieved an annual attendance of 1 million+ visitors for the first time, and as of 2026, the park provides nearly 1,800 jobs annually. The Dallas Zoological Society is supported by over 25,500 membership households. The DZS manages all fundraising, membership, special events, food services, retail operation, volunteer programs, marketing, and public relations for the zoo under management contract with the City of Dallas.

== History ==
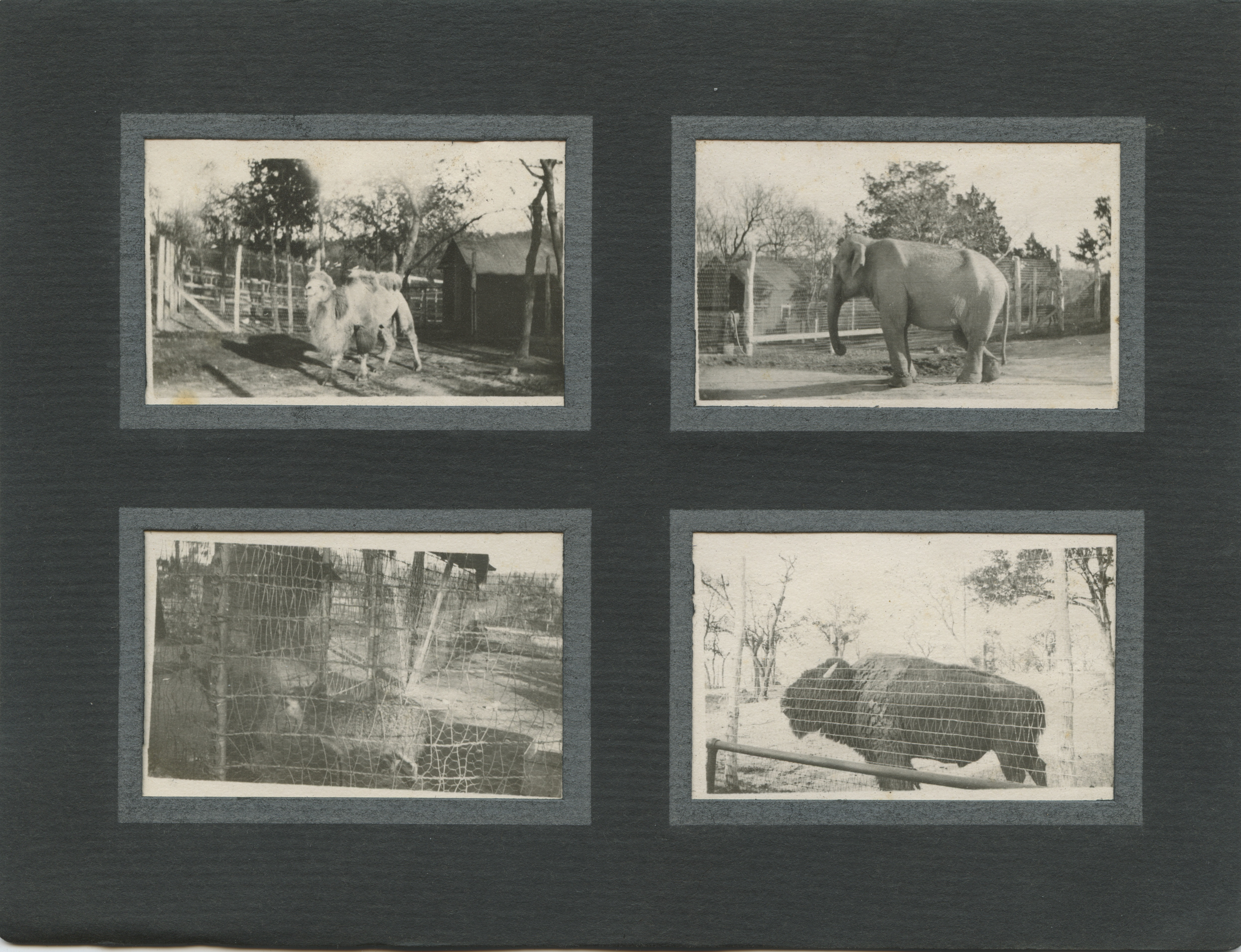
Historical photographs of the early days of the zoo, 1917

The zoo was established in 1888. The zoo's first purchase was two deer and two mountain lions for $60 from a private seller in Colorado City, Colorado. The animals were placed in pens and put on display in City Park. In the 1890s, the Dallas City Council approved funding for the zoo and more animals were purchased and added to the zoo's collection. The zoo called City Park home until 1910, when it was relocated to Fair Park. In 1912, the zoo moved to 36 acres (15 ha) in Marsalis Park which the city had purchased in 1909, from which it has expanded to its current size. Under the leadership of Zoo Commissioner William H. Atwell, the zoo acquired many more animals as well as exhibits. In the 1920s, a special Zoo Commission was created by the city and the collection was further developed with the acquisition of numerous specimens from game hunter and trapper Frank Buck. In the Depression era of the 1930s, the facilities at the zoo underwent extensive renovation funded by the Works Progress Administration.

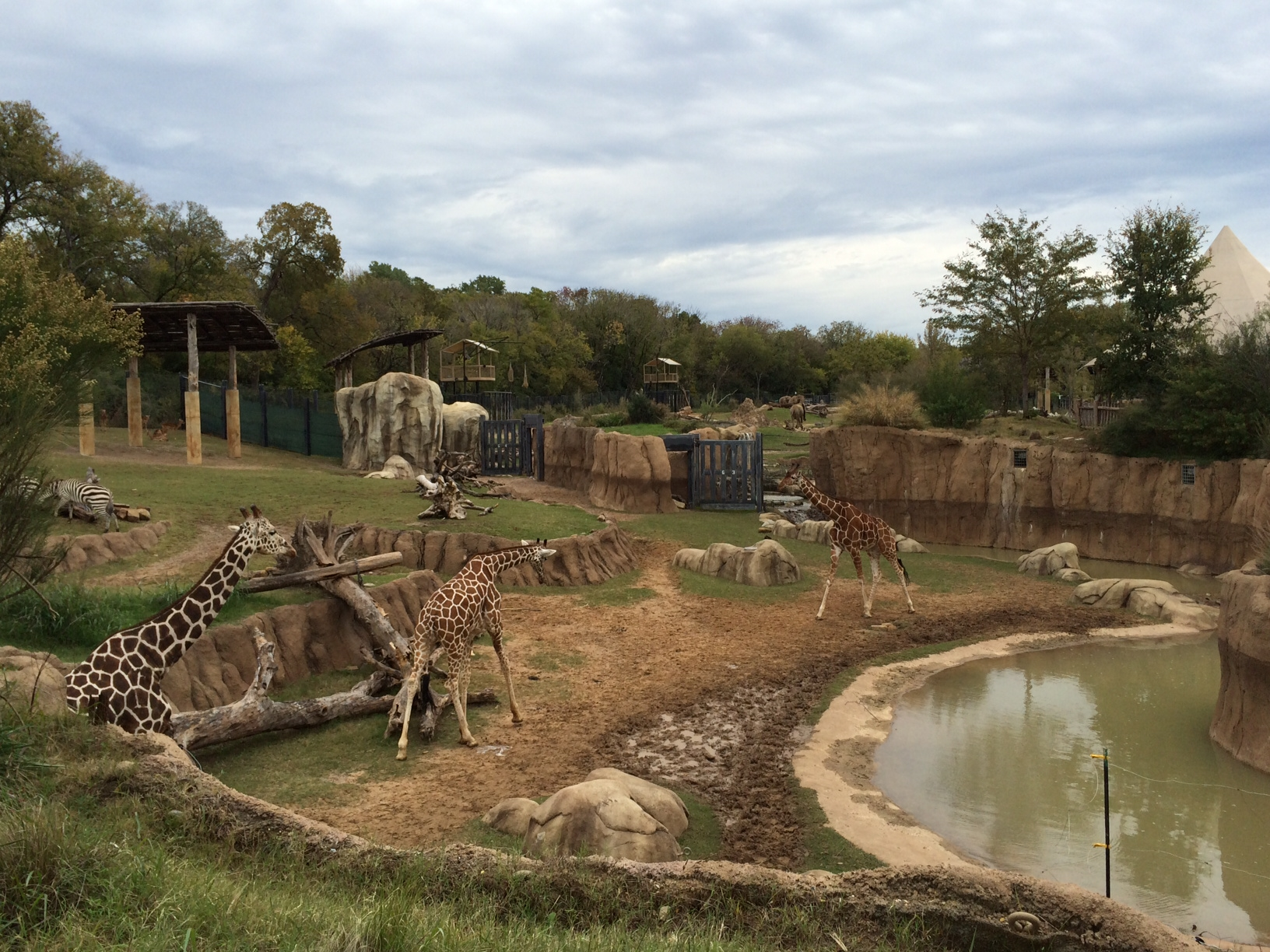
Giraffes, zebras, antelopes and elephants in Giants of the Savanna

The Dallas Zoological Society was established in 1955 to support the zoo.

By the 1960s, the zoo was a popular and profitable attraction. In 1966, the zoo displayed over five hundred species of animals. However, by the 1980s, attitudes began to change from the profit-driven display of animals towards scientific research and the humane treatment of animals strongly advocated by the AZA. More emphasis was put on saving endangered species, partly by breeding animals in captivity. The Dallas Zoo cooperated with this program and was accredited in 1985. Around the same time, Zoo Director Warren J. Iliff proposed an addition to be known as the Wilds of Africa. Herbert W. Reimer, a New York architect, designed the Wilds of Africa with a "zoogeographic grouping" of African animals. In addition to a nature trail, he further envisioned a slow moving monorail that visitors could ride and observe as if on safari. Two bond measures, amounting to $30.4 million, brought the expansion from the drawing board in 1983 to its opening in June 1990.

On June 14, 1996, rail and bus service arrived at the zoo. Dallas Zoo station opened on the first phase of the Red Line. The connection to DART made getting to the zoo significantly more convenient.

In 1997, the 19,000 sq ft (1,800 m^{2}) Kimberly-Clark Chimpanzee Forest exhibit opened to the public.

On May 8, 1999, the 2-acre (0.81 ha), $4.5 million ExxonMobil Endangered Tiger Habitat opened.

On September 3, 2008, the zoo announced it had received the largest gift in its 120-year history, a $5 million donation from Harold Simmons. This donation, as well as other factors, allowed the zoo to fast track the construction of the Giants of the Savanna habitat.

On August 12, 2009, the Dallas City Council voted unanimously to turn the zoo over to private management. On October 1, 2009, the zoo's management responsibilities, animals, and employees were officially turned over to the Dallas Zoological Society.

On May 28, 2010, the Giants of the Savanna habitat opened to national acclaim.

On April 1, 2015, the Dinosaur exhibit opened hosting over 20 animatronic dinosaurs.

== Exhibits ==
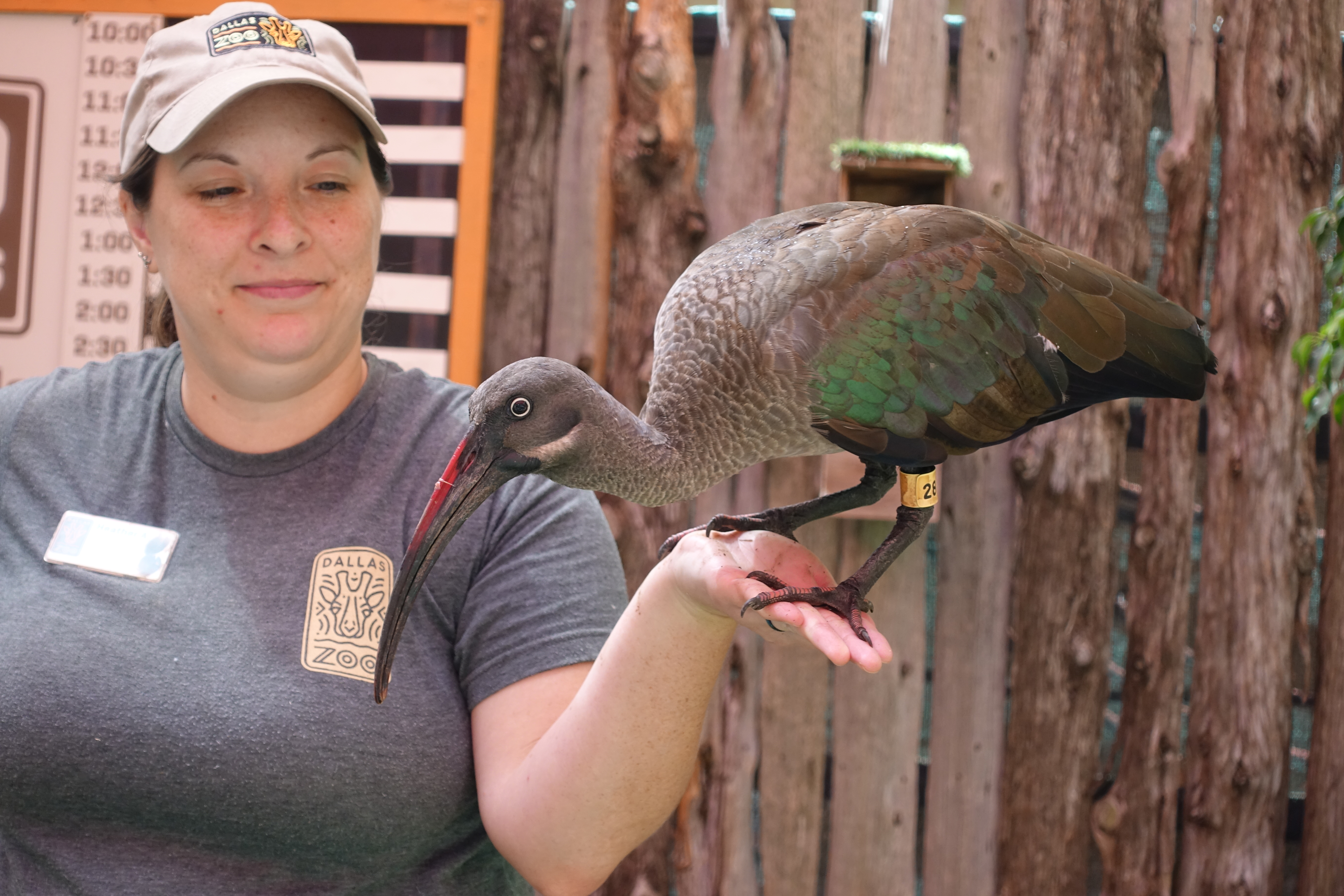
A Hadada ibis (Bostrychia hagedash brevirostris) is perched on the arm of a Dallas zookeeper before flight

The zoo is divided into two major regions: ZooNorth and Wilds of Africa. ZooNorth is the original and oldest section of the zoo. The Wilds of Africa region was constructed seventy-eight years after ZooNorth and is accessed from ZooNorth via a tunnel beneath Clarendon Drive. It includes Giants of the Savanna, which was opened in 2010. Visitors can download the Dallas Zoo iPhone app to assist them in navigating the zoo. The zoo app is free and provides information about hours, admission, parking, directions, animals, membership, educational programs, and special events, as well as maps. The zoo is the first in the United States to offer visitors such an app in both English and Spanish.

=== ZooNorth ===
ZooNorth is the original and oldest section of the zoo. It features a wide range of exhibits The Wildlife Amphitheater is home to SOAR! A Festival of Flight. Primate Place features monkeys, with species from Africa and South America. ZooNorth is also home to the Pierre A. Fontaine Bird & Reptile Building where visitors are encouraged to learn about endangered reptiles, amphibians, and what can be done to save them.

Endangered Tiger Habitat

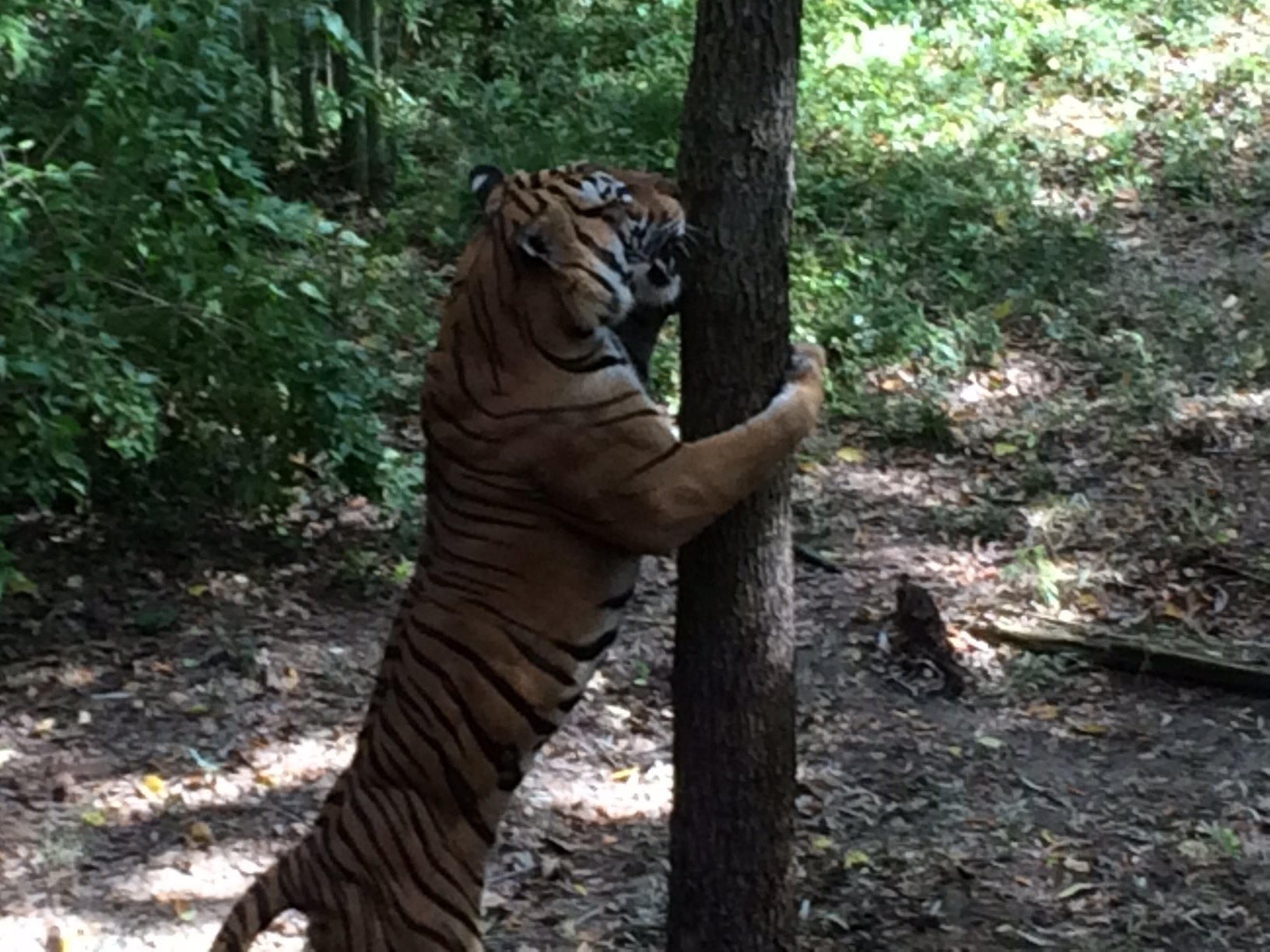
Tiger using tree as scratching post

The ExxonMobil Endangered Tiger Habitat is a 2-acre (0.81 ha), $4.5 million habitat that opened on May 8, 1999, and resembles a forest in the process of regrowth after logging. A glass viewing area and pathways allow the visitor to observe Sumatran tigers and Malayan tigers. The tigers' lush exhibits feature sun and shade, shallow pools with deep channels, running streams with hot rocks, perching rocks, and climbing/clawing trees. The observation area of the exhibit consists of two buildings; House of Tiger and House of Man, designed in the Thai pole house style. The complex acts as a bridge spanning the Valley of the Tiger placing the visitors in the center of the tiger's landscape.

Children's Zoo

The Lacerte Family Children's Zoo in ZooNorth is home to the Nature Exchange, the JC Penney Discovery House, the UnderZone, a petting zoo, and pony rides. It also features an artificial creek that children are encouraged to splash around in.

BUG U!

An exhibit that teaches children about the zoo's extensive collection of invertebrates (i.e. a termite colony, honey bee colony, Texas leafcutter ants, black widows, and brown recluse spiders).

=== Wilds of Africa ===
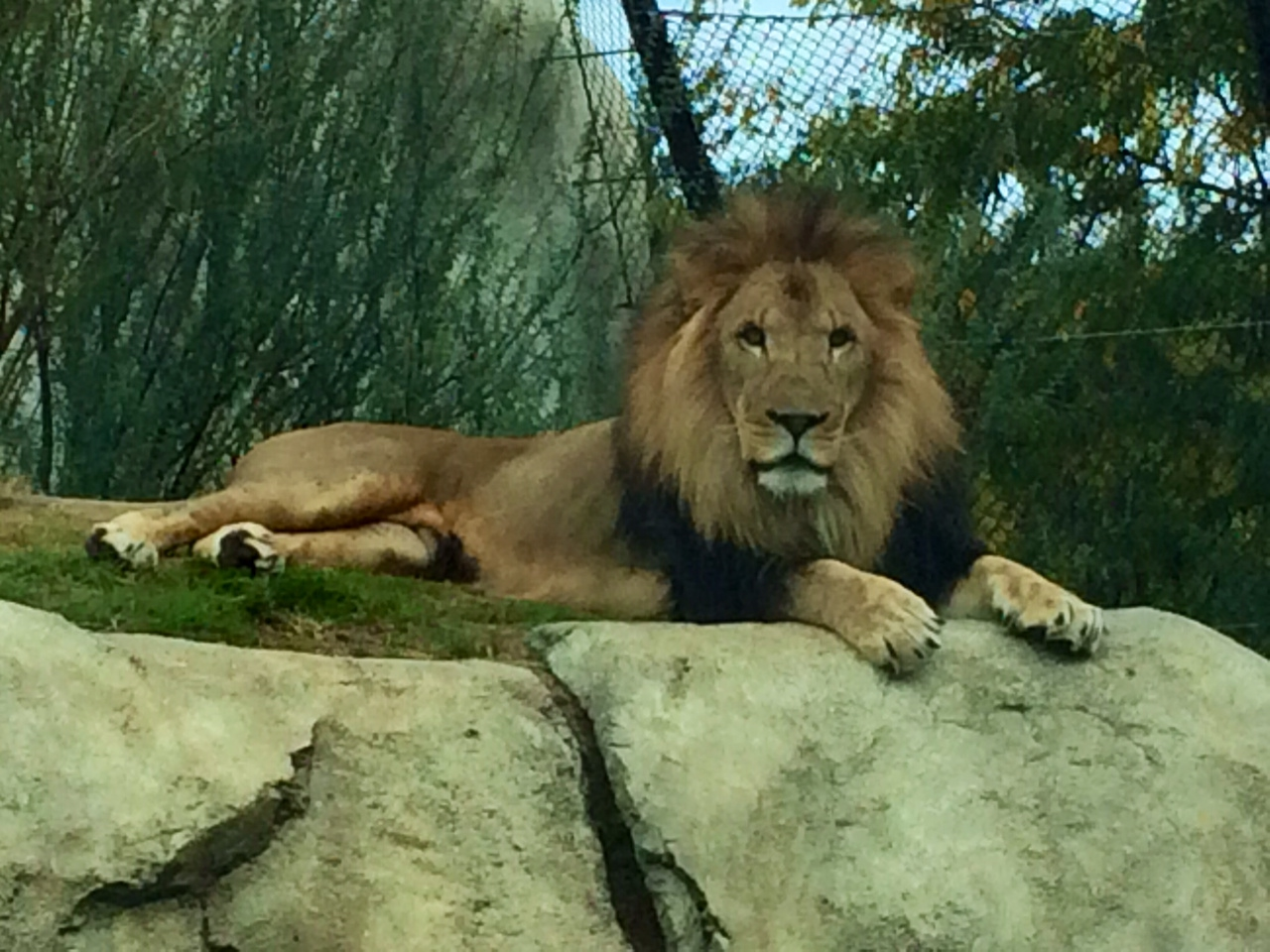
Dallas Zoo's African lion

The other half of the zoo is the Wilds of Africa. Opened in 1990, it was the first exhibit to feature all of the major habitats of Africa. Visitors can visit the rain forests, mountains, woodlands, rivers, deserts, and bush of Africa. The Nature Trail takes visitors through the rain forest past two large, naturalistic gorilla habitats. Nile crocodiles, wattled cranes, and a few other animals are seen before the Forest Aviary. In the middle of the forest is the Kopje, home to klipspringers. The rain forest/watering hole is also home to hippopotamus and okapi, which the zoo, in the case of the latter, is famous for in both its breeding and research. About 20 percent of okapi in zoos in the U.S. and Japan can trace their lineage back to it.

Penguin Cove

Penguin Cove is home to about a dozen African penguins. The penguins can be seen above and under the water as they walk and swim around their exhibit.

Chimpanzee Forest

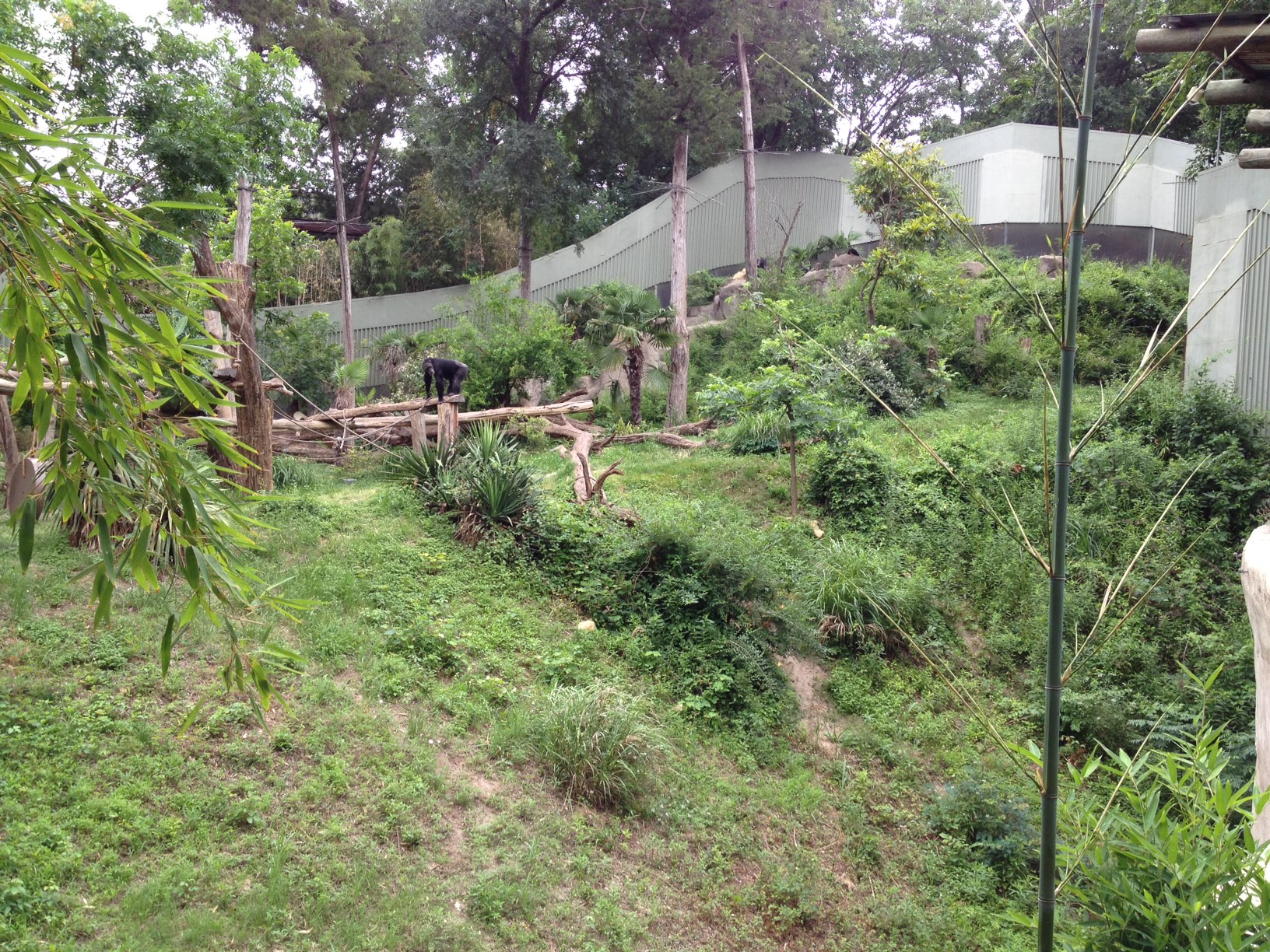
Chimpanzee Forest

The 19,000 sq ft (1,800 m^{2}) Kimberly-Clark Chimpanzee Forest exhibit opened in 1997. Visitors can observe the chimpanzees from the open air viewing station or from the floor-to-ceiling observation windows. Chimpanzee Forest features a waterfall, stream, climbing structures, trees and rocks that are heated in the winter and cooled in the summer. Another feature is an artificial termite mound where the chimpanzees can fish with long sticks for special treats, such as peanut butter and honey. In addition to their food from the zoo commissary, there are more than 40 edible plants in their area for them to forage on.

Gorilla Research Center

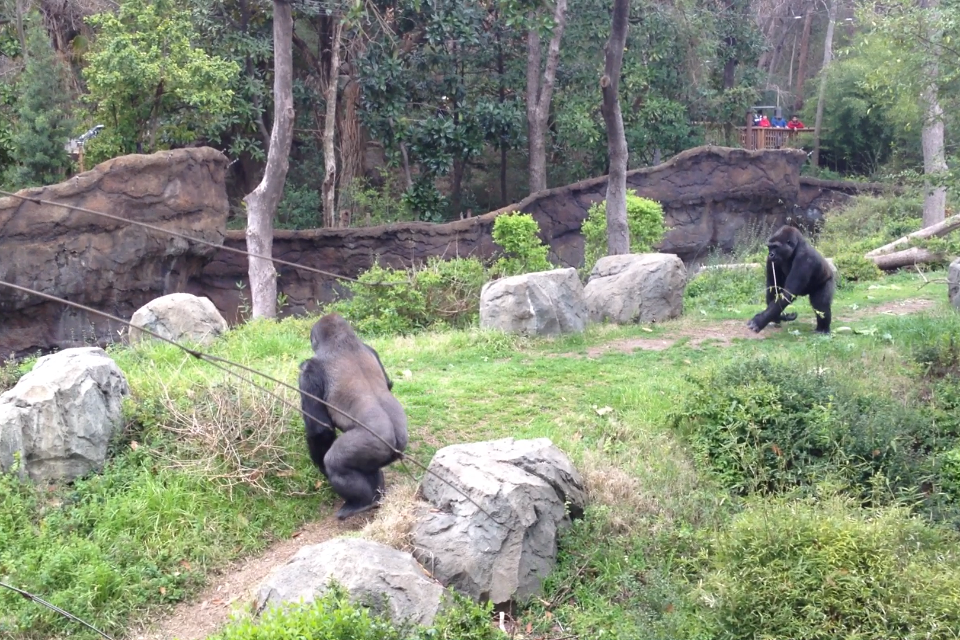
Juba and B'wenzi in the bachelor habitat

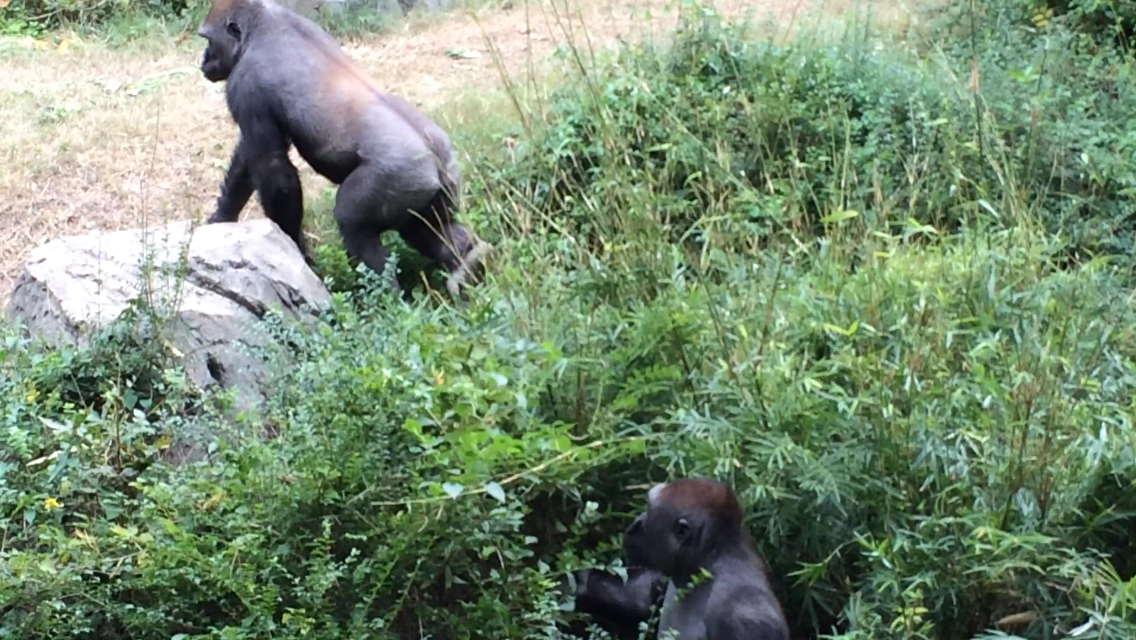
Shana and Zola in the bachelor habitat

Originally opened in 1990, the Gorilla Research Center is a 2-acre (0.81 ha) habitat featuring a lush naturalistic landscape. The habitat was designed in a way that encourages the gorillas to roam freely in an environment that replicates, as closely as possible, their native equatorial forest habitat. The exhibit includes two areas, separated by a wall, which provide enough room for two gorilla troops. The exhibit closed in 2004 and reopened in 2006 after undergoing a $2.2 million renovation to raise the exhibit walls from 12 feet to 15 feet and add a visitor center.

The visitor center is known as the Gorilla Research Station. It features high vantage points and floor-to-ceiling windows where visitors can view both troop habitats and have their questions answered by on site gorilla guides. The habitat is currently home to two troops of western gorillas; a bachelor troop and a family troop. The bachelors are named Juba, B'wenzi, Shana, and Zola. Juba and B'wenzi came to the Dallas Zoo in 2011 and Shana and Zola, half-brothers, arrived in 2013. Zola gained Internet fame in 2011 when video of him "break dancing" went viral. The family troop members are silverback Marcus, Shanta, Saambili (born in 2018), Megan, her son Mbani (born in 2019) and Asha. The goal was for former silverback Patrick and one of the females to breed but in September 2013) the plan was abandoned due to Patrick's lack of interest in reproducing. He was relocated to Riverbanks Zoo & Garden in Columbia, S.C. in 2013.

Crocodile Isle

Crocodile Isle allows visitors to view Nile crocodiles from behind glass. Visitors can watch crocodiles swim, lounge in the sun, and even devour their food at public feedings.

Forest Aviary

The Forest Aviary contains colorful and exotic birds native only to Africa in a habitat featuring a wooded landscape, rock cliffs, and a tranquil stream.

Wilds of Africa Adventure Safari (Former)

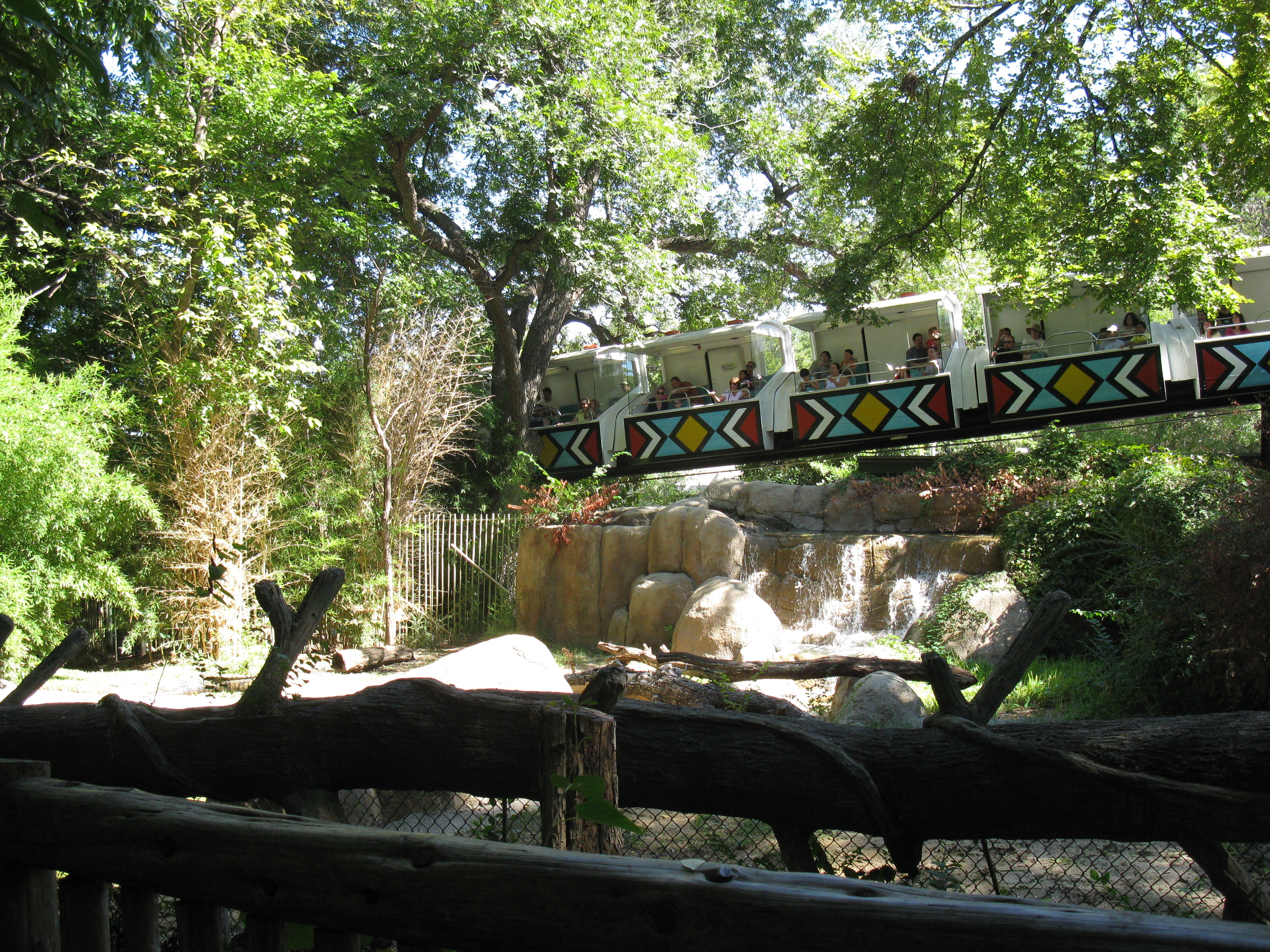
Dallas Zoo Monorail

The Wilds of Africa Adventure Safari was a 20-minute, one-mile, narrated monorail ride, which traveled around the watering hole (hippopotamus) rain forest (okapi), mountain (Nubian ibex), woodlands (Grévy's zebra), river (waterbuck, great white pelicans, Goliath herons, blue cranes), arid desert (scimitar-horned oryx, addra gazelle), semi-arid desert (addax, gemsbok, ostrich) and bush (gerenuk, black crowned cranes, greater kudu, Thomson's gazelle, marabou storks) exhibits.

The monorail featured aerial views of the Simmons Hippo Outpost, Chimpanzee Forest, Nile crocodile, and Penguin Cove exhibits, which are accessible via the Nature Trail. The monorail originally opened in 1990 but after two decades of use and over a million passengers, the attraction began to show its age with aging infrastructure and several electrical outages that left passengers stranded on the tour. The final incident in August 2014 prompted zoo officials to shut down the attraction for evaluation. Following the evaluation the DZS decided a $3 million renovation was in order. On March 25, 2016, the Monorail Safari reopened as the Wilds of Africa Adventure Safari featuring a new sound system, an upgraded station, air-conditioning, upgraded mechanical and electrical components and new graphics on the individual cars. Additionally, a diesel powered tug was on standby to nudge the trains back to the station in the event of a power failure. The Adventure Safari Monorail permanently closed in 2020.

Giants of the Savanna

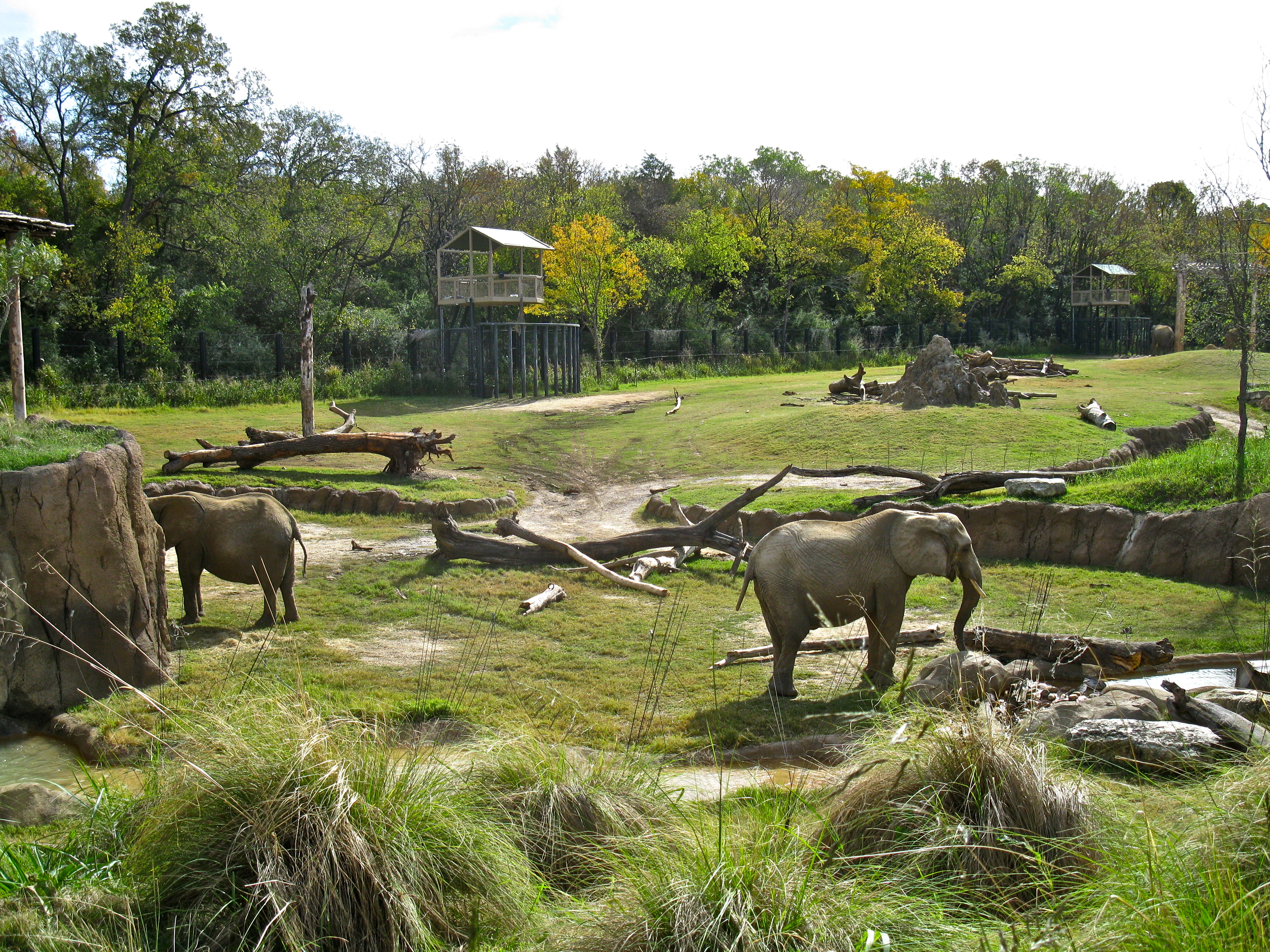
Elephants in the Giants of the Savanna habitat

Phase II of the Wilds of Africa, Giants of the Savanna, opened on May 28, 2010. This is an 11-acre (4.5 ha) expansion to the current Wilds of Africa, and features six female and two male African bush elephants, a large herd of reticulated giraffes, African lions, South African cheetahs, impala, ostriches,vulturine guineafowl, warthogs, red river hogs and the newest attraction African wild dogs. Visitors have the opportunity to feed lettuce leaves and rye crackers to the herd of giraffe at the Giraffe Feeding Station. Five of the eleven acres are dedicated to the eight African bush elephants; Jenny, Gypsy, Kamba, Congo, Tendaji, Mlilo, Zola, and Okubili (Ajabu died in May 2023). The elephants' facilities are state of the art with padded floors and a community room with seven feet of dirt that allows the pachyderms to indulge their natural inclination for digging. The exhibit was the first in North America to mix elephants with giraffes, zebras, ostriches, impala, and guineafowl. On March 11, 2016, five new African elephants arrived from Eswatini's Hlane Royal National Park in order to survive a drought. Two years later, Nolwazi and her daughter Amahle were transferred to Fresno Chaffee Zoo in Fresno, California.

Also in the exhibit is a pride of four lions and an African painted dog pack. In between the lion and painted dog exhibits, there is a "Predator Encounter" area where the keepers give educational talks. Climate controlled rocks draw the lions to a floor-to-ceiling bay window at the Serengeti Grill, where they sit or lay within mere inches of diners.

== Awards ==
On October 6, 2011, the zoo received special recognition from the Association of Zoos and Aquariums for the Giants of the Savanna Habitat. The $32.5 million habitat is the first in North America, as well as one of the first on the planet, to combine a variety of large species in a single exhibit in order to re-create the landscape of the African savanna.

== Conservation ==
The zoo is highly proactive in species preservation and conservation efforts and participates in over 40 Species Survival Plans (SSP) with the Association of Zoos and Aquariums. The following is a list of the Species Survival Plans (SSP) that the zoo is involved with

- Addax
- Addra gazelle
- African elephant
- African lion
- African penguin
- African wild dog
- Allen's swamp monkey
- Andean condor
- Arabian oryx
- Aruba Island rattlesnake
- Bali starling
- Bengal tiger
- Black rhinoceros
- Eastern bongo
- Cheetah
- Chestnut-mandibled toucan
- Chimpanzee
- Chinese alligator
- Cottontop tamarin
- Fishing cat
- Geoffroy's spider monkey
- Giant panda
- Golden lion tamarin
- Great hornbill
- Grévy's zebra
- Grey parrot
- Hippopotamus
- Impala
- Indian rhinoceros
- Jaguar
- Komodo dragon
- Kori bustard
- Lake Victoria cichlids
- Louisiana pine snake
- Malayan tiger
- Mandrill
- Mona monkey
- Ocelot
- Okapi
- Oriental small-clawed otter
- Pink pigeon
- Puerto Rican crested toad
- Radiated tortoise
- Rhinoceros hornbill
- Ring-tailed lemur
- Ruffed lemur
- Scimitar oryx
- Snow leopard
- Somali giraffe
- Spectacled langur
- Sumatran tiger
- Thick-billed parrot
- Toco toucan
- Wattled crane
- Western lowland gorilla
- White-cheeked gibbon
- White rhinoceros

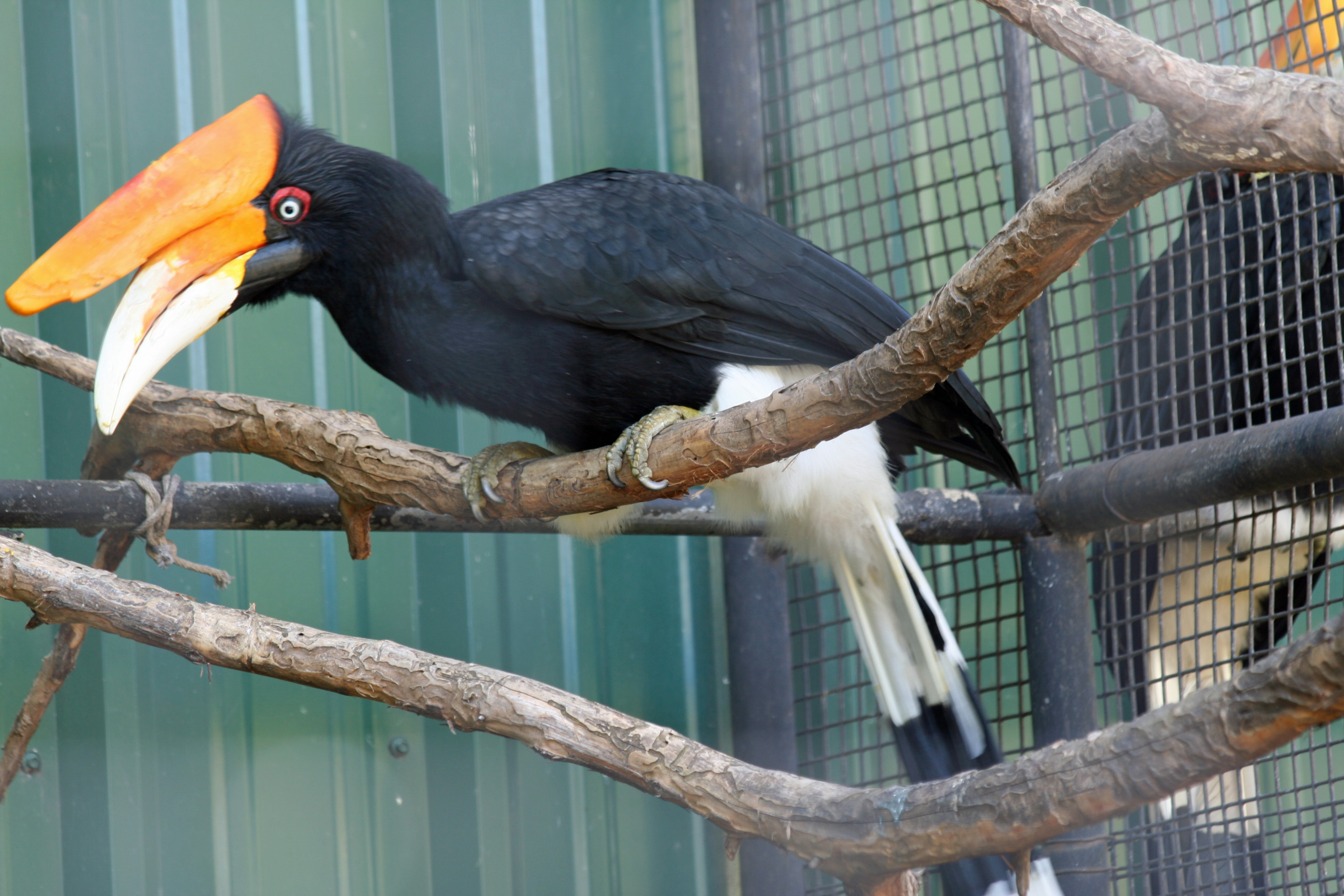
A Rhinoceros Hornbill at the zoo

The zoo supports many conservation projects including Okapi Conservation - Epulu Research Station, Zaire, International Rhino Foundation, Chimp Haven, Bushmeat Crisis Task Force, Gray's Monitor Lizard In The Philippines, Taxon Advisory Groups (Tag), Bowling For Rhinos, and the Thailand Hornbill Project - Adopt A Hornbill Nest. In addition to conservation, sustainability efforts by the zoo include growing bamboo and cabbage to function as part of the landscape aesthetic throughout the zoo. The overgrowth is harvested and used as food for the zoo's herbivores.

Cell Phone Recycling

The zoo collects and recycles cell phones through a program called ECO-CELL. The objective of both the zoo and ECO-CELL is to reduce coltan mining. Coltan is a raw material used in the manufacturing process of cell phones and it is mined almost exclusively in the Democratic Republic of the Congo. The mining results in a loss of habitat for gorillas, elephants, okapi and many others. For every cell phone recycled through ECO-CELL, the zoo receives a donation to its conservation fund. ECO-CELL has partnerships with over 110 zoos and is a member of the Association of Zoos and Aquariums (AZA).

== Events ==
Safari Nights is the zoo's concert series that takes place on eight consecutive Saturday nights during the summer season.

Zoo To Do is the zoo's annual fundraising gala. Patrons of this exclusive event have the opportunity to view the animals, enjoy food from some of Dallas’ top chefs, bid on auction items, and dance.

Dollar Day at the zoo is held one day in July and one day in November. The zoo shows its appreciation to the community for its support with $1 admission all day. Families can look for dollar deals on food, drinks and gifts throughout the zoo.

Zoo Lights is the zoo's Christmas celebration event. Visitors can drive through a one-mile long trail that has over one million lights. Many of the lights are in the shape of zoo animals.

== Future ==
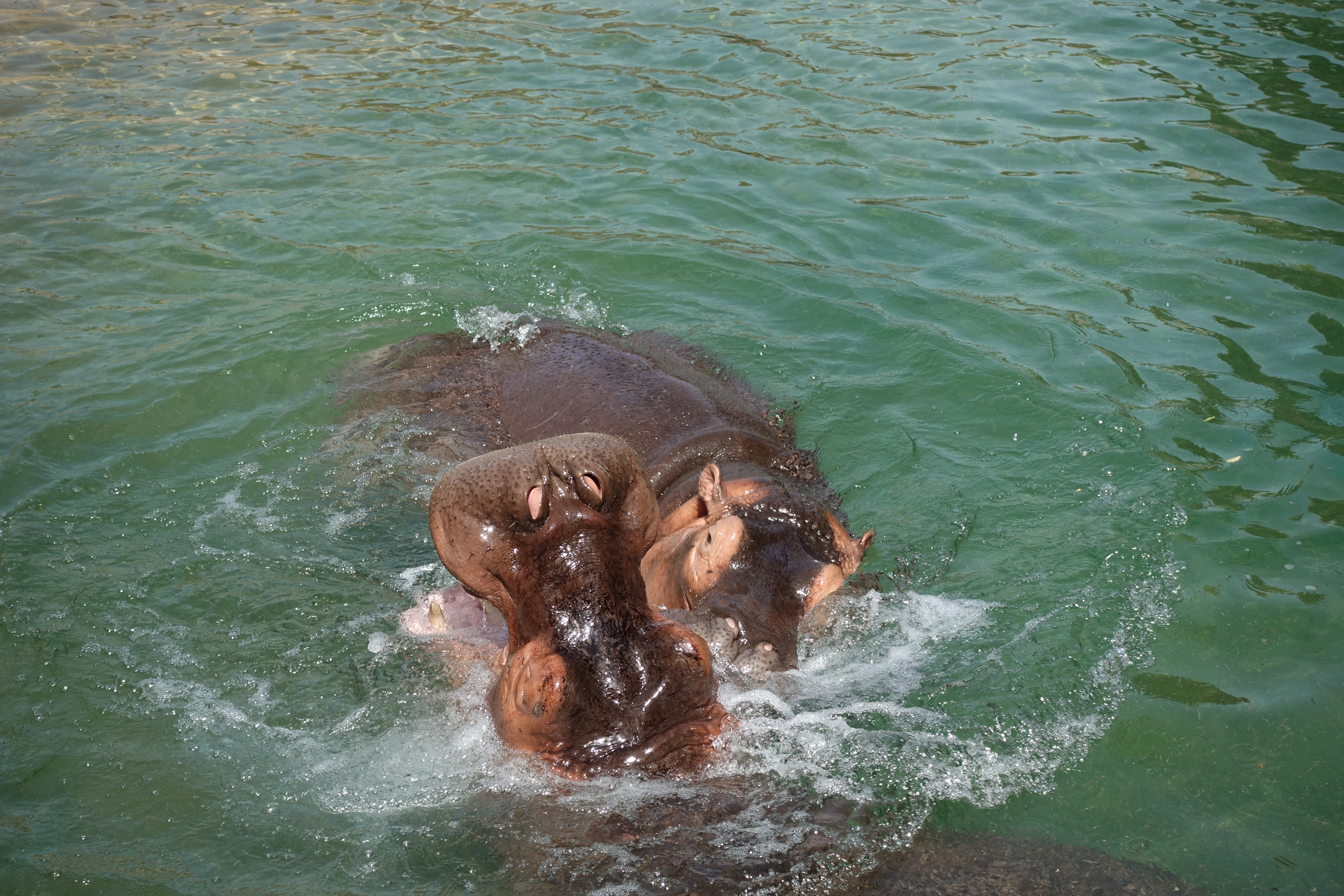
Hippos in the water

In Spring 2017, hippos returned to the zoo for the first time since the death of their last hippo 15 years back with the opening of Simmons Hippo Outpost. In February 2016 ground was broken on the $13.5 million, 3.5 acre immersive habitat that houses four Nile hippos; one male (Gus) and three females (Boipelo, Addy, and Kalo). The habitat features an overlook deck and an underwater viewing area.

The Dallas Zoo Conservation Education & Science Center is a proposed 70,400 sq ft (6,540 m^{2}) facility that will be located adjacent to ZooNorth. The facility will be a teaching laboratory for conservation of the world ecology systems and will be LEED certified silver level category. It will include research, teaching and interpretive facilities, and will become the new entrance to the zoo. This project is currently in the design phase and on hold pending funding.

== Transportation ==
The nearest DART station is Dallas Zoo on the Red Line. The zoo is also served by bus routes 19, 515 and 522.

Every Monday and Tuesday, from March through December, the zoo offers $2 off admission to visitors who present their same-day DART pass at the Dallas Zoo ticket booth.

== Incidents ==
On November 28, 1998, a male gorilla named Hercules attacked a female zookeeper, biting her 33 times, after a gate was inadvertently left open while she was cleaning his holding pen. Hercules was tranquilized with a dart gun and was returned to his enclosure. The zookeeper was hospitalized for three weeks and spent a year in physical therapy.

In 1999, Jenny, then the zoo's oldest gorilla, wandered into the staff area through an unlocked door. She encountered a group of startled zoo staff, one of whom firmly told her to go back into her enclosure, which she promptly did. Zoo staff then relocked the door without further incident.

In 2000, a chimpanzee named Judy climbed out of her enclosure on her first day outside, apparently ignoring shocks from an electric fence. She was then electrocuted climbing on power lines.

On March 18, 2004, a gorilla named Jabari scaled a retaining wall and injured four visitors. He was fatally shot by a police SWAT team after being pursued by zoo employees through the Wilds of Africa exhibit. This incident prompted several zoos to create or enhance emergency response teams to deal with escaped animals. The Jake L. Hamon Gorilla Research Center was redesigned with new landscape, taller walls, and expanded viewing areas for visitors, including an air conditioned visitor center with floor-to-ceiling windows, videos, and on-site “gorilla guides” to answer questions and point out interesting facts. The exhibit is home to two gorilla troops.

On February 13, 2010, a female gorilla named Tufani escaped from her enclosure after a zookeeper unlocked the door, failing to notice that two gorillas were inside, and turned away. The zookeeper then saw Tufani walking down a hallway in the staff area and triggered a "code red", activating safety procedures put into place after Jabari's escape; she then locked herself in another part of the staff area with another employee. Zoo staff converged on the gorilla habitat, found Tufani, tranquilized her, and safely returned her to the enclosure. No visitors were endangered because the zoo was closed due to snow; however, the incident triggered an investigation by the United States Department of Agriculture.

On November 17, 2013, one of the male lions, either Dinari or Kamaia, killed Johari, one of the three lionesses. Witnesses to the tragedy say that it appeared that both of the male lions were simply roughhousing with Johari. Apparently one of the males seized Johari by the neck, cutting off her oxygen supply. Witnesses said they didn't know Johari had been killed until she went visibly limp. By then, zoo keepers were on the scene throwing meat into the habitat in an attempt to distract the two brothers. Dallas Zoo officials later confirmed that Johari sustained no other wounds and was killed quickly by the bite she suffered to the neck. A reason for the attack was not immediately determined.

On July 28, 2015, a giraffe calf named Kipenzi died when she broke her neck after accidentally running into the edge of her herd's enclosure. Kipenzi was born into fame after her birth was broadcast and streamed live on Animal Planet.

On July 4, 2019, Ola, an eight year old African painted dog recently obtained by the Dallas Zoo, was found dead in her back enclosure. She died after her pack mates, Mzingo and Jata, attacked her and delivered wounds that were fatal. Ola was transported from the Columbus Zoo a few weeks prior to her death and seemed to get along well with her packmates. The Dallas Zoo said on Twitter the dogs were only exhibiting natural behavior and did nothing wrong.

On March 27, 2020, the Dallas Zoo revealed on social media that silverback gorilla Subira had died of heart failure. He had a cough that was being monitored; zoologists believed he had "nothing more of a common cold". A necropsy revealed that Subira had a cardiovascular disease. The zoo had worked closely in research on how to prevent heart disease in male gorillas, the leading cause of death in them. It was also stated that Subira was healthy and examinations confirmed that nothing else was wrong with him besides his heart condition. The Dallas Zoo stated that the gorilla did not contract the deadly COVID-19 virus, which at the time was ravaging countries all over the world and was starting to affect species of animals as well. Subira was the second gorilla death at the zoo in four months following the death of Hope in November 2019. Before his death, he fathered two children, Saambili and Mbani. He was the only full-grown silverback in the family troop.

Throughout October 2021, the Dallas Zoo faced multiple losses within their herd of giraffes. On October 2, staff discovered a nineteen-year-old giraffe, Auggie, that had died; it was later revealed that he died of hepatitis. On October 3, a three-month old giraffe calf was euthanized. Finally, on October 29, 2021, Jesse, a third giraffe, aged fourteen, was found dead with "abnormal liver enzymes." After two months of investigation, the zoo concluded the three deaths were not related.

=== Early 2023 security breaches ===
On January 13, 2023, employees discovered that Nova, a four year old clouded leopard, was missing from her habitat. The zoo closed while staff searched for the animal. She was found on zoo grounds in the late afternoon and was safely returned to her enclosure. Zoo president Gregg Hudson said that a "suspicious opening" was found in her enclosure, and Dallas police opened an investigation into the incident, describing it as "an intentional act". The following day, staff members found similar "deliberate cuts" in the spectacled langur monkey exhibit, but found no evidence that the four monkeys had been injured or had left the enclosure. The following weekend, Pin, one of the zoo's critically endangered lappet-faced vultures, was found dead with "an unusual wound", with the necropsy report deeming the death "very suspicious". The zoo increased security measures, offered a US$10,000 reward for information leading to an arrest and indictment, and announced that the U.S. Fish and Wildlife Service was now assisting in the investigation.

On January 30, the zoo said two of its emperor tamarin monkeys were missing and that their habitat had been "intentionally compromised”, with the monkeys potentially being stolen. The same day, police released surveillance footage of a man believed to have information about the missing monkeys, asking for the public's help in identifying him. Both monkeys were recovered the next day and returned to the zoo after police found them at an empty house in Lancaster. Police were led to the house by the pastor of the adjacent church, which had used the house for community events before it fell into disrepair and disuse. The house had recently been broken into and signs of human habitation and dogs, cats, chickens, and pigeons were found inside. Church members said that the man in the surveillance footage had attended recent church services, behaving strangely, and was suspected of squatting in the house because he had been seen lingering around it, but no one had caught him inside.

On February 3, Dallas police announced that the man had been arrested after leaving the Dallas World Aquarium, where staff recognized him as he examined animal exhibits. The 24-year-old suspect faces charges of burglary and animal cruelty. In the arrest-warrant affidavit, police said that the suspect visited the World Aquarium a short time before the monkeys disappeared, asking aquarium staff "obscure questions" about the care and transport of exotic animals including emperor tamarins. The affidavit also said that several items stolen from the staff area of the otter exhibit at the World Aquarium in early January were found in the Lancaster house. The suspect has no known connection to the Dallas Zoo other than as a visitor. A police spokeswoman said he confessed to "some of the crimes" at the zoo but did not elaborate. The spokeswoman said that the death of the vulture was still under investigation.
