= Cedars station =

DART rail station in Dallas, Texas

Cedars
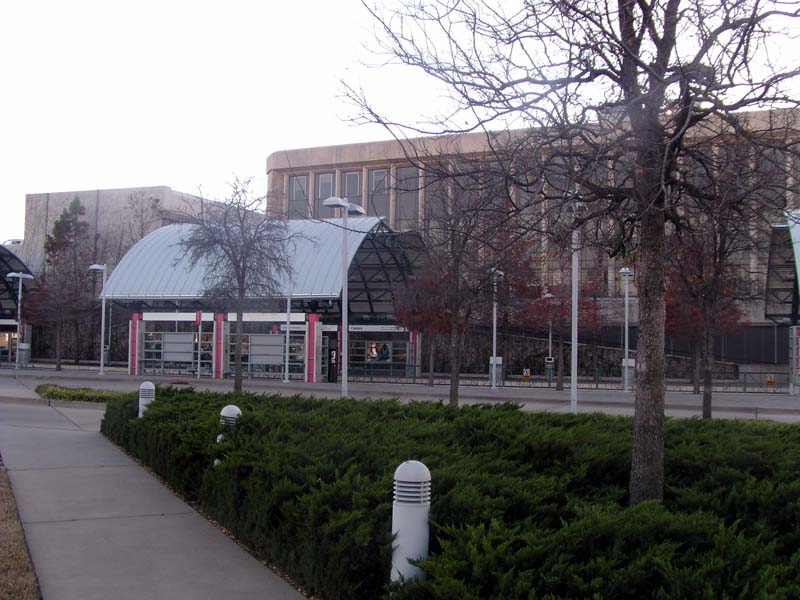

General information
- Location: 1112 Belleview Street, Dallas, Texas 75215
- Coordinates: 32°46′8″N 96°47′37″W
- System: DART rail
- Owner: Dallas Area Rapid Transit
- Platforms: Two side platforms
- Connections: DART: 308 (M-F), South Dallas GoLink Zone (M-Sun)

Construction
- Cycle facilities: One locker, one rack
- Accessible: Yes

History
- Opened: June 14, 1996

Services
Preceding station	DART	Following station
8th & Corinth toward Westmoreland	Red Line	Convention Center toward Parker Road
8th & Corinth toward UNT Dallas	Blue Line	Convention Center toward Downtown Rowlett
Location

Cedars station is a DART rail station in Dallas, Texas. It is located at Belleview and Wall Streets in the Cedars neighborhood of South Dallas. It opened on June 14, 1996, and is on the Red and Blue lines, serving Old City Park with connecting service to Fair Park, as well as the Dallas Police Department headquarters.
