= Tyler/Vernon station =

DART rail station in Oak Cliff, Dallas, Texas

Tyler/Vernon
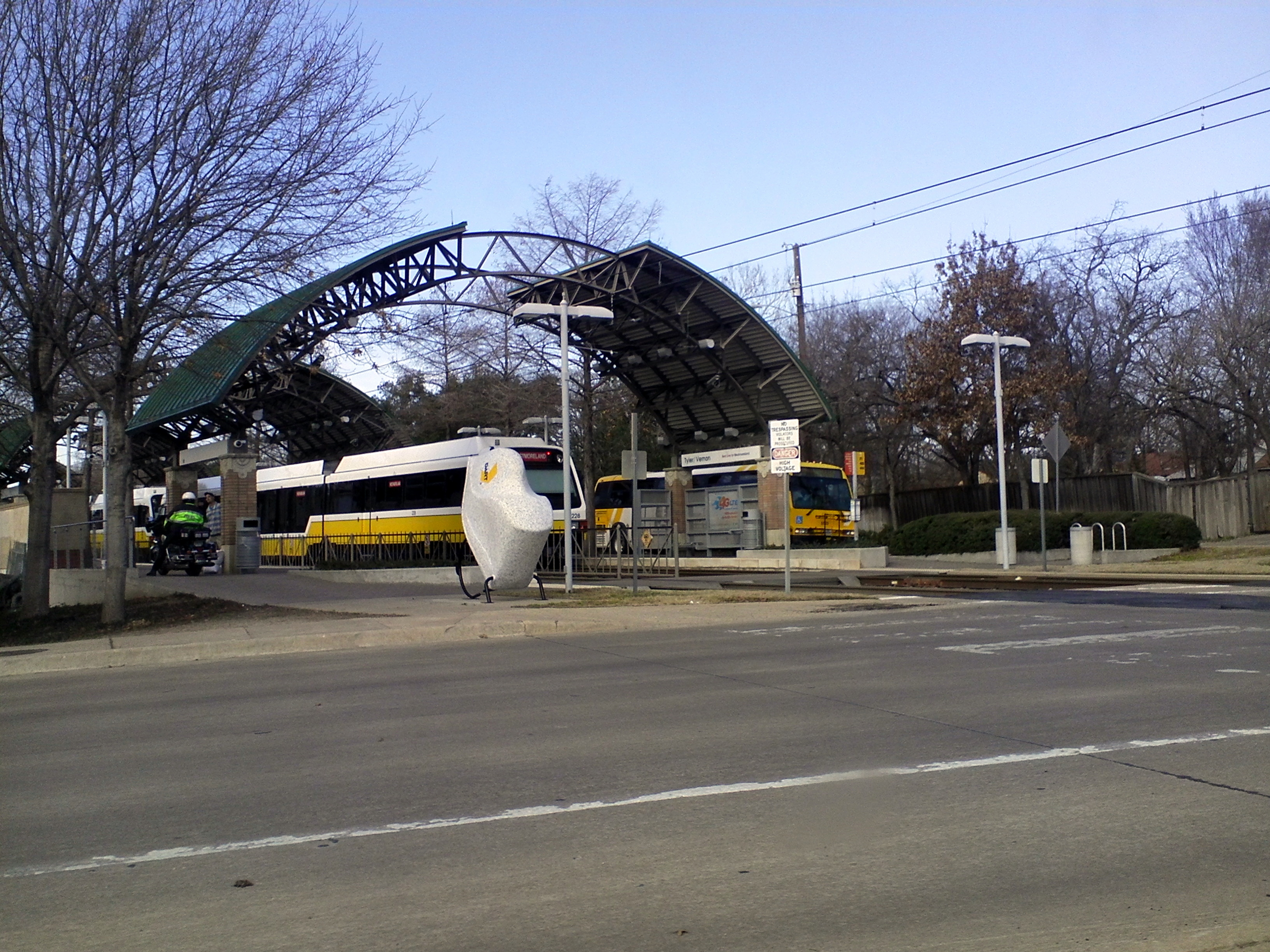

General information
- Location: 1225 South Tyler Street; Dallas, Texas
- Coordinates: 32°43′59″N 96°50′18.5″W
- System: DART rail
- Owner: Dallas Area Rapid Transit
- Platforms: 2 side platforms
- Tracks: 2
- Connections: DART: 147, 219, 226

Construction
- Structure type: At-grade
- Cycle facilities: 3 lockers, 2 racks
- Accessible: Yes

History
- Opened: June 14, 1996

Passengers
- FY 2025: 301 (avg. weekday) ▲6.7%

Services
Preceding station	DART	Following station
Hampton toward Westmoreland	Red Line	Dallas Zoo toward Parker Road
Location

Tyler/Vernon station is a DART rail station in Oak Cliff, Dallas, Texas. The station is located along Lebanon Avenue at its intersection with Tyler Street (known as Vernon Avenue south of the station) and serves the Red Line.

The station serves surrounding residential areas, including Elmwood, Polk Vernon, and Wynnewood North. The station also serves Tyler Station, a makerspace and community center, which is located south of the rail station in a former Dixie Wax Cup factory.

The station opened on June 14, 1996.
