= Hampton station (DART) =

DART rail station in Dallas, Texas

Hampton
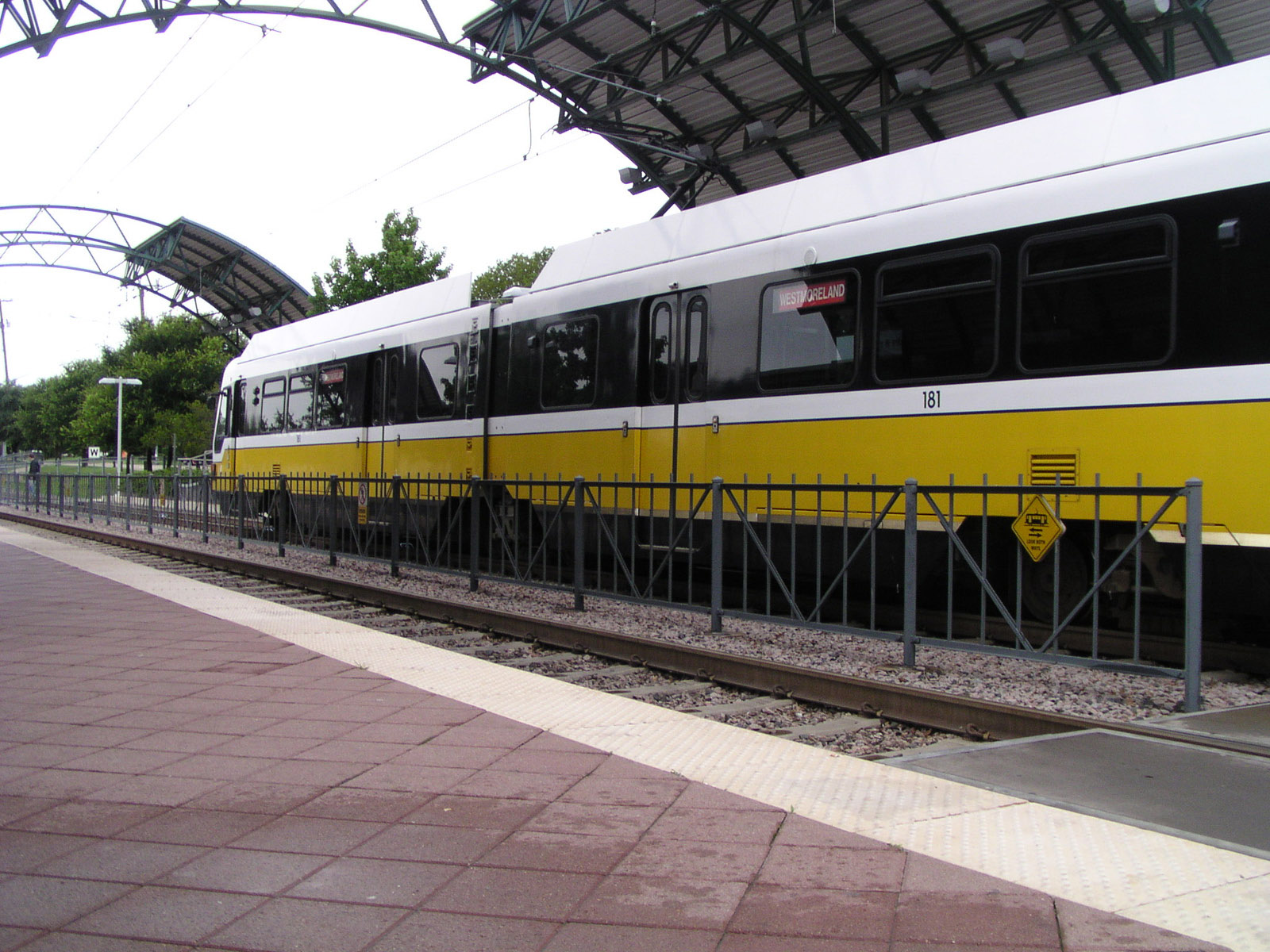
- A southbound train at the station

General information
- Location: 2002 South Hampton Road; Dallas, Texas 75224
- Coordinates: 32°43′35″N 96°51′19.5″W
- System: DART rail
- Owner: Dallas Area Rapid Transit
- Platforms: 2 side platforms
- Connections: DART: 101

Construction
- Structure type: At-grade
- Parking: 514 free spaces, no overnight
- Cycle facilities: 4 lockers, 1 rack
- Accessible: Yes

History
- Opened: June 14, 1996

Services
Preceding station	DART	Following station
Westmoreland Terminus	Red Line	Tyler/Vernon toward Parker Road
Location

Hampton station is a DART rail station in Dallas, Texas. It is located in the Oak Cliff neighborhood at Hampton Road and Wright Street. It opened on June 14, 1996 and is a station on the Red Line, serving the nearby YWCA and Sunset High School.

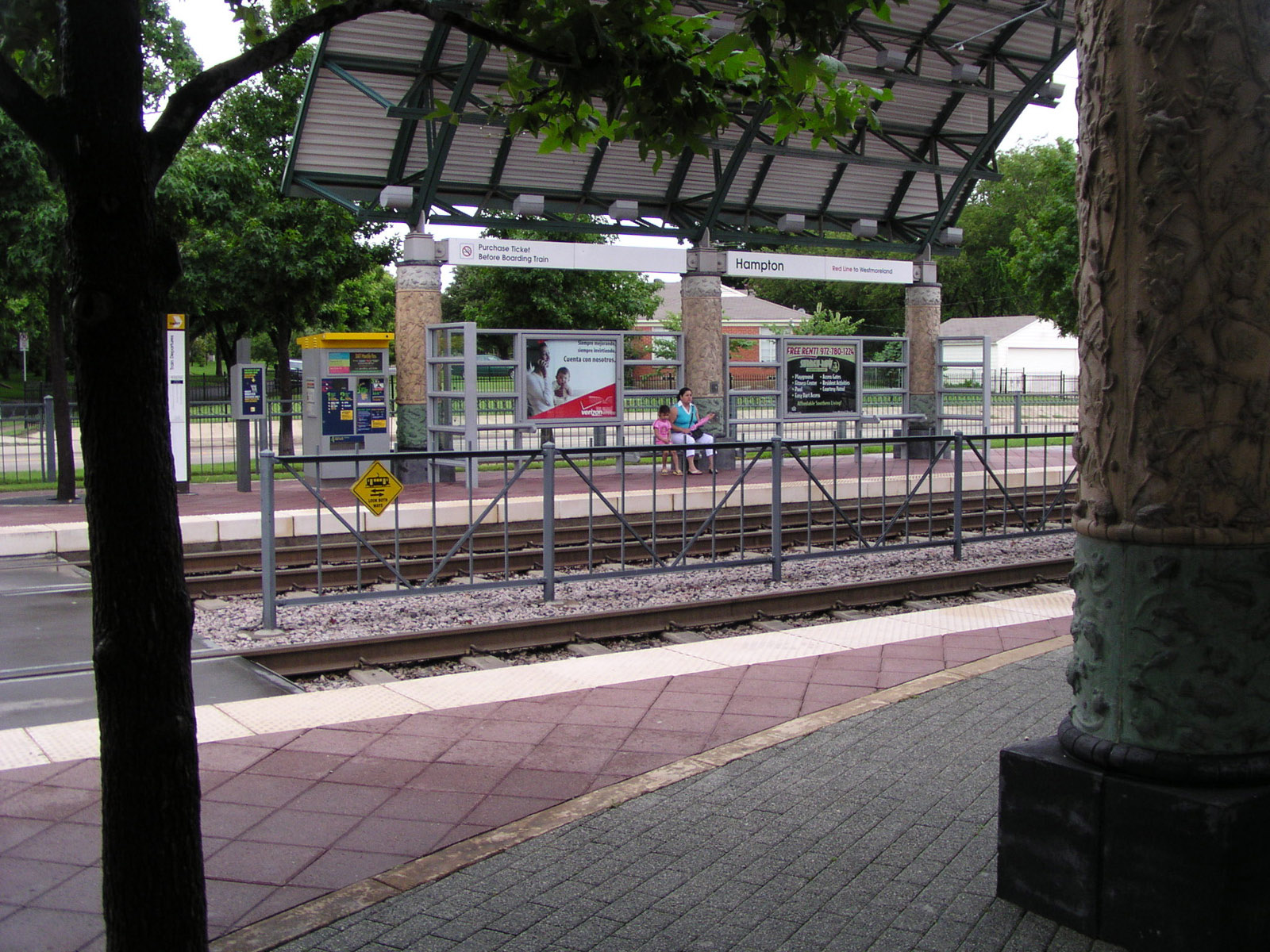
Passengers waiting at the station
