= Cedars, Dallas =

Coordinates: 32.7702°N 96.7998°W

Cedars
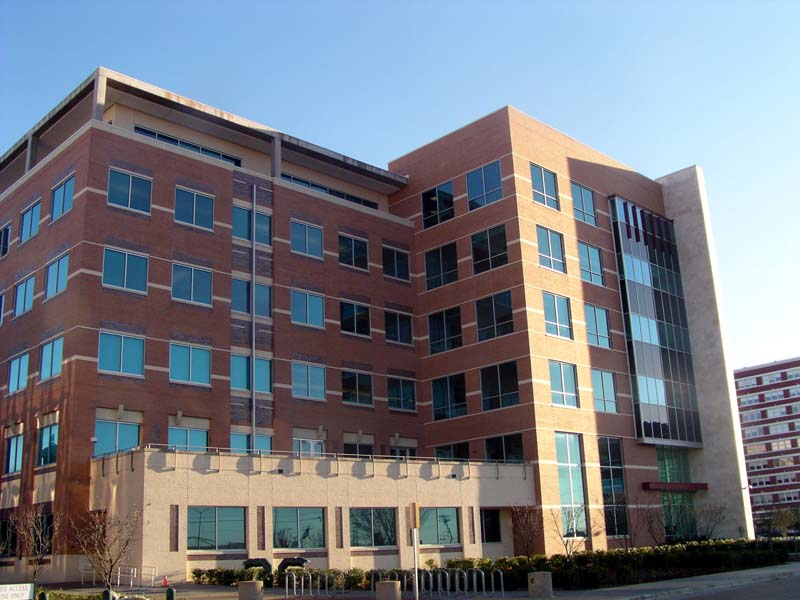
- The Dallas Police Headquarters on Lamar Street

- Location in Dallas
- Country: United States
- State: Texas
- Counties: Dallas
- City: Dallas
- Area: South
- Elevation: 423 ft (129 m)
- ZIP code: 75215, 75226
- Area codes: 214, 469, 972

The Cedars is a district in Dallas, Texas (U.S.). It is adjacent to and south of downtown and Interstate 30, east of Austin Street, north of Corinth Street, and west of the 75 & 345 Overpasses just east of South Good Latimer Expy.

== History ==
The Cedars was originally developed in the 1870s with moderately-priced homes, but by the late 19th century the neighborhood had become one of the premier destinations in Dallas, with stately Victorian homes belonging to wealthy businessmen, lawyers, and politicians dotting the streets. The Cedars was also the home of Dallas' Jewish community, and the neighborhood included the Shaareth Israel synagogue. (Stanley Marcus of Neiman Marcus fame was born in the Cedars.) By the early 20th century, however, light industry and growing population pressures had begun to take the bloom off the neighborhood's rose, and most of the city's wealthiest began to move further north to neighborhoods northeast of downtown. Even as industry, such as the Sears-Roebuck warehouse that now is home of the South Side on Lamar lofts, moved in, fine homes continued to be built, especially for well-to-do members of the Jewish community. But by the 1920s, the massive Victorians of the late 19th century were gone, the synagogue was demolished, and most people moved on. In the 1960s, virtually all of the remaining homes were destroyed by the city for highway projects. Today, only a scant handful of homes (perhaps as few as six) from the neighborhood's original residents survive, none in restored condition.

In addition to light industry, the area has been a haven for artists, musicians and urban dwellers for over 20 years. It has recently experienced the beginnings of an urban transformation with new townhomes, renovated warehouse lofts and apartments and developments such as DART's Cedars Station, the loft/retail development Southside on Lamar, and the Dallas Police Headquarters.

In June 2015, Cedars was the site of a shootout between Dallas Police Department officers and a mentally disturbed man who attacked the police headquarters building. The suspect, James Boulware, was the only casualty of the incident.

== Government and infrastructure ==
The Texas Department of Criminal Justice (TDCJ) operates the Region II Parole offices and the Dallas I and Dallas III district parole offices in the Cedars.

== Notable residents ==
- Stanley Marcus – American businessman (1905–2002)

== Education ==
=== Public schools ===
The Dallas Independent School District assigned the neighborhood to the following schools:

- Martin Luther King Learning Center
- Billy Earl Dade Middle School
- James Madison High School (originally Forest Avenue High School)

City Park Elementary School in Cedars, named for its location across Old City Park, first opened in 1919, and served the community until it closed in 2012. As of 2013 it is used as an after-school program's classroom location. In 2014 the nonprofit Vogel Alcove began leasing the school building, providing day care and preschool to homeless children.

== Transportation ==
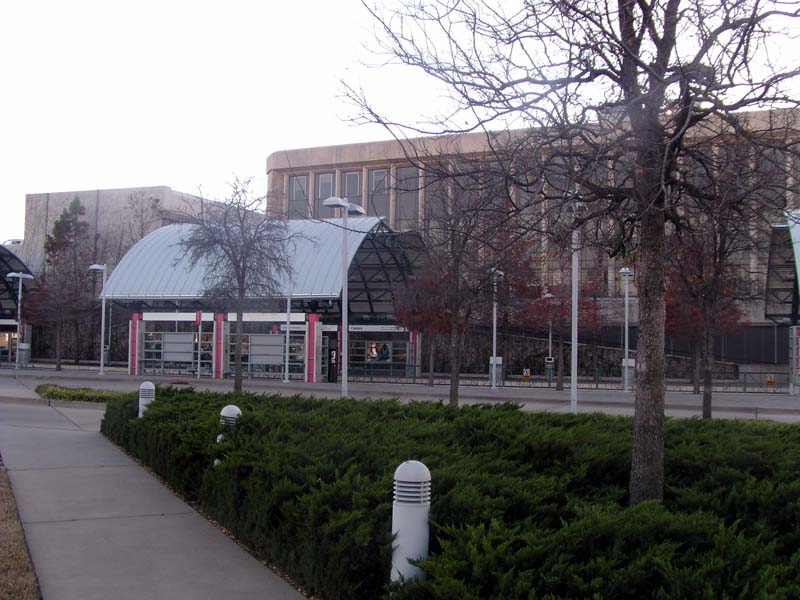
Cedars Station

=== Trains ===
==== Light rail ====
- DART: Red Line and Blue Line
  - Cedars Station
  - Google Street View (map)

=== Highways ===
- Interstate 30
- Interstate 45
