= Red Line (DART) =

Light rail line in the Dallas-Fort Worth Metroplex, Texas

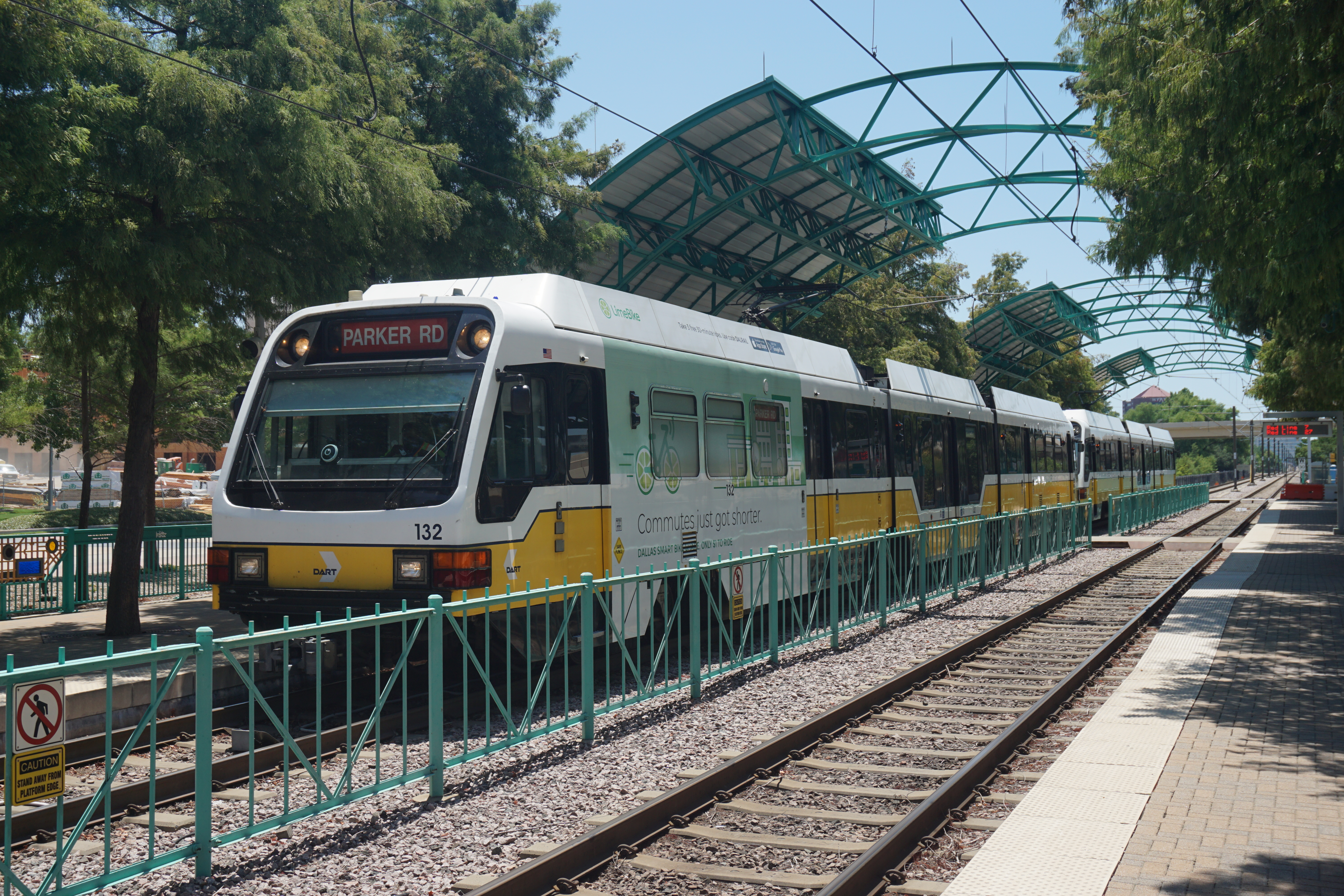
- Northbound Red Line train at Galatyn Park Station

Overview
- Owner: DART
- Locale: Dallas, Texas
- Termini: Parker Road (north); Westmoreland (south)
- Stations: 26

Service
- Type: Light rail
- System: DART rail
- Operator(s): DART
- Rolling stock: SLRV

History
- Opened: June 14, 1996

Technical
- Line length: 27.7 mi (44.6 km)
- Track gauge: 4 ft 8 1/2 in (1,435 mm)
- Electrification: Overhead catenary, 750 V DC
- Highest elevation: At grade, elevated, underground
Route map
Red Line highlighted in red

The Red Line is a light rail line in Dallas, Texas operated by the Dallas Area Rapid Transit system. It began operations in June 1996, and is one of two inaugural light rail lines in the DART rail system alongside the Blue Line.

== Route ==
=== Westmoreland to Downtown ===
The southwestern terminus of the Red Line is at Westmoreland Station in southwest Dallas at the intersection of Illinois Avenue and Westmoreland Road. The southwestern part of the Red Line runs on a private right-of-way with grade crossings. Just before 8th & Corinth, the line merges with the Blue Line. The joint Red and Blue Line tracks then rise on to a viaduct that crosses Cedar Creek, the Trinity River, and a freight railroad line. At Lamar Street, the line turns north at a wye where a pair of tracks leading to one of two train yards on the system diverges. The Red and Blue Lines continue north, crossing the Landry Freeway, travelling under the Dallas Convention Center and stop at Dallas Union Station. After crossing over Main Street, the lines turn east as they merge with the Green Line and Orange Line and enter downtown Dallas. At this point, the lines leave their right of ways and operate on a dedicated street-running right of way.

=== Downtown to Parker Road ===
The four DART lines share a common section of track through downtown, with four stops: West End, Akard Street, St. Paul Street and Pearl Street.

After Pearl Street, street running ends and the lines return to private right-of-ways. The four lines diverge at a wye, with the Green Line diverging to the southeast while the Red, Blue and Orange Lines turn north, cross the Good-Latimer Expressway at grade, and descend into a long tunnel under the Central Expressway (US 75), with a stop at Cityplace. The lines exit the tunnel at Mockingbird. The Blue Line diverges from the Red Line and heads east, while the Red and Orange Lines turn north.

The Red Line then travels through north Dallas, Richardson and Plano. Most of the line runs at grade level with grade crossings, although portions of the route run on elevated viaducts. The line terminates at the Parker Road Station at Park Boulevard near Central Expressway in Collin County.

== History ==
Much of the line was constructed on the former Texas Electric Railway route, which ceased operations in 1948.

The Red Line was part of the initial launch of DART's light rail testing and service in 1996. At the time, the line only ran from Westmoreland Station to Pearl Station in the northeast corner of downtown. In 1997, the Red Line was extended to Park Lane Station, and was the first DART line to use the 3.5-mile twin tunnels. On December 18, 2000, Cityplace Station, the southwest's first commercial subway station was opened along the Red Line underneath Cityplace Tower in the tunnel under the Central Expressway.

In 2002, the Red Line extended into Richardson, ending at Galatyn Park Station, extending the light rail service 9 miles (14.5 km) over its original length. Later that year, the line was opened to the Parker Road Station, an additional 3 miles (4.8 km) of track, its current terminus.

== Plans for expansion ==
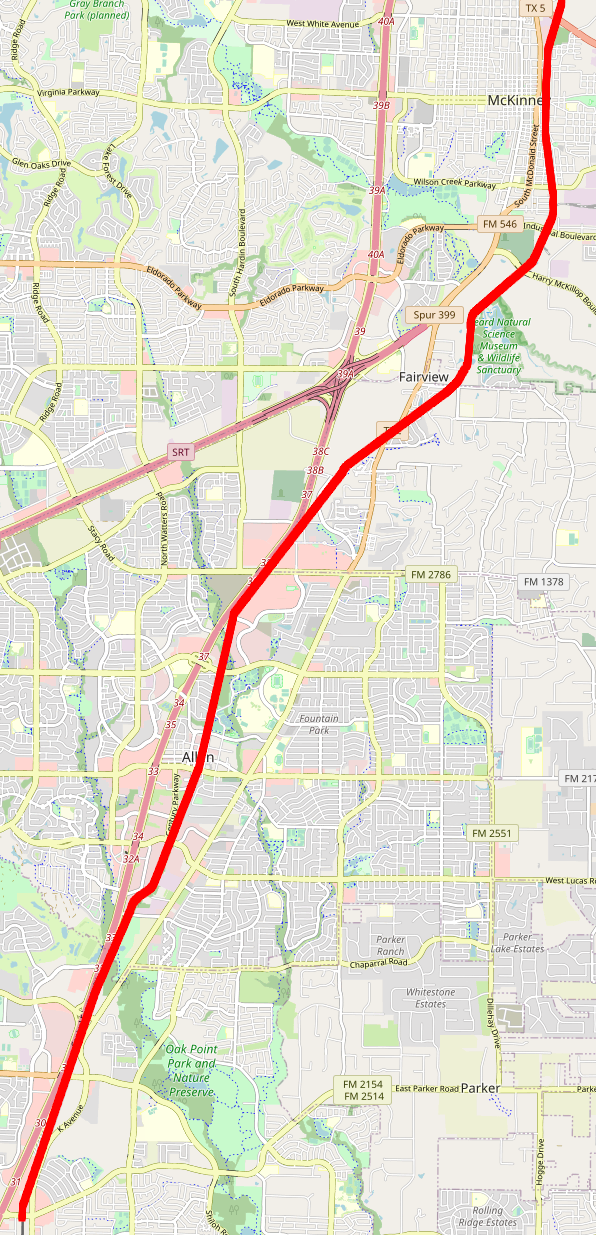
DART-owned corridor from Parker Road station to Downtown McKinney for possible future rail service expansion

The current northern terminus of the Red Line is Parker Road station in Plano. The further north suburb, Allen, is eligible to join DART. However, active Red line service is unable to expand further north because Allen is currently unable to levy the 1% sales tax required for DART membership.

The North Central Texas Council of Governments (NCTCOG) in a 2022 meeting discussed the possibility of expansion of the Red Line corridor from Plano through Allen to McKinney. Either the Red Line or the Silver Line could be extended north. The study proposed seven stations between the current Parker Road Station and the hypothetical northern terminus Downtown McKinney Station. The extension would be 18 miles long, cost between $700 million and $900 million to construct, and is estimated to have 7,000 to 8,000 riders a day by 2045.

== Stations ==
=== Daily Service ===
Listed from north to south; stations in grey are temporarily closed

Station	Other lines	Opened	Notes
Parker Road	(peak only)	December 9, 2002	Terminus for Red and Orange Lines (peak only)
Downtown Plano	(peak only)	December 9, 2002	
12th Street	(peak only)	October 25, 2025	Northernmost transfer for the Silver Line
CityLine/Bush	(peak only)	December 9, 2002	Formerly Bush Turnpike Station until March 14, 2016. Southernmost transfer for the Silver Line
Galatyn Park	(peak only)	July 1, 2002	
Arapaho Center	(peak only)	July 1, 2002	
Spring Valley	(peak only)	July 1, 2002	
LBJ/Central	Orange Line (DART)	July 1, 2002	Terminus for Orange Line outside peak hours
Forest Lane	Orange Line (DART)	July 1, 2002	
Walnut Hill	Orange Line (DART)	July 1, 2002	
Park Lane	Orange Line (DART)	January 10, 1997	
Lovers Lane	Orange Line (DART)	January 10, 1997	
SMU/Mockingbird	Blue Line (DART) Orange Line (DART)	January 10, 1997	Northernmost transfer for the Blue Line
Cityplace/Uptown	Blue Line (DART) Orange Line (DART)	December 18, 2000	Transfer to M-Line Trolley
Pearl/Arts District	Blue Line (DART) Green Line (DART) Orange Line (DART)	June 14, 1996	Easternmost transfer for Green Line
St. Paul	Blue Line (DART) Green Line (DART) Orange Line (DART)	June 14, 1996	Transfer to M-Line Trolley (one block north)
Akard	Blue Line (DART) Green Line (DART) Orange Line (DART)	June 14, 1996	
West End	Blue Line (DART) Green Line (DART) Orange Line (DART)	June 14, 1996	Westernmost transfer station for the Green Line and Orange Line
EBJ Union Station	Blue Line (DART)	June 14, 1996	Transfer to Dallas Streetcar, Trinity Railway Express, and Amtrak
Convention Center	Blue Line (DART)	June 14, 1996	Closed to allow renovations to Kay Bailey Hutchison Convention Center; will reopen in 2029
Cedars	Blue Line (DART)	June 14, 1996	
8th & Corinth	Blue Line (DART)	June 14, 1996	Southernmost transfer for the Blue Line
Dallas Zoo		June 14, 1996	
Tyler/Vernon		June 14, 1996	
Hampton		June 14, 1996	
Westmoreland		June 14, 1996	

=== Special Event Service ===
- Deep Ellum Station (Served regularly by Green Line)
- Baylor University Medical Center Station (Served regularly by Green Line)
- Fair Park Station (Served regularly by Green Line)
- Victory Station (Also served by Green Line, Orange Line)
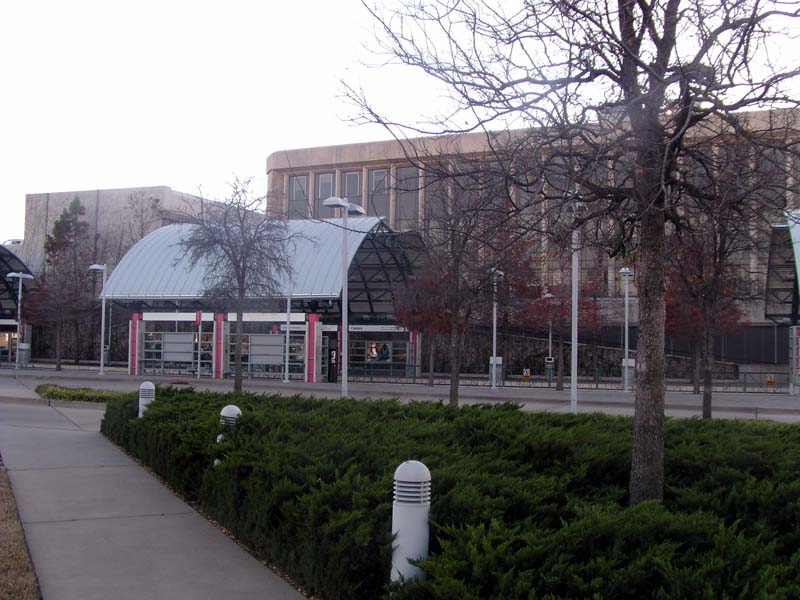
Cedars Station in the Cedars neighborhood of south Dallas

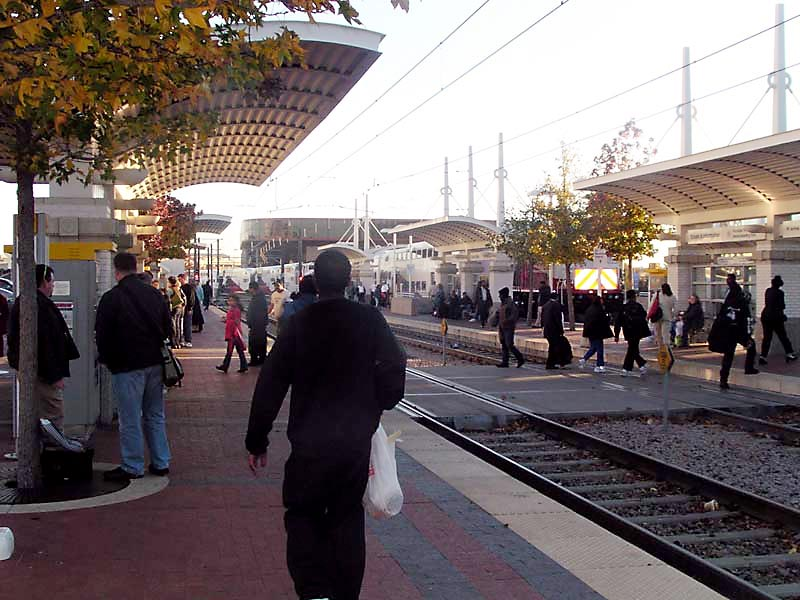
Union Station in the Reunion District of downtown

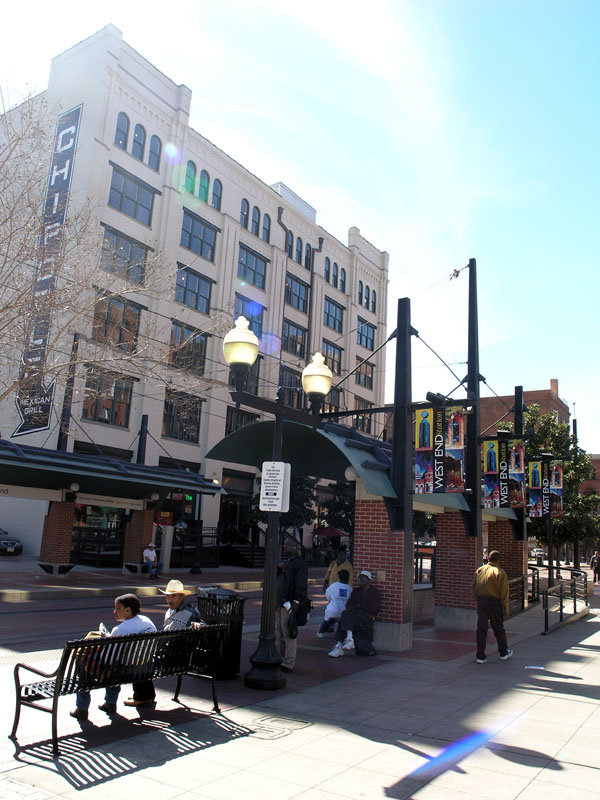
West End Station in the West End Historic District of downtown
