= Westmoreland station (DART) =

DART rail station in Dallas, Texas

Westmoreland
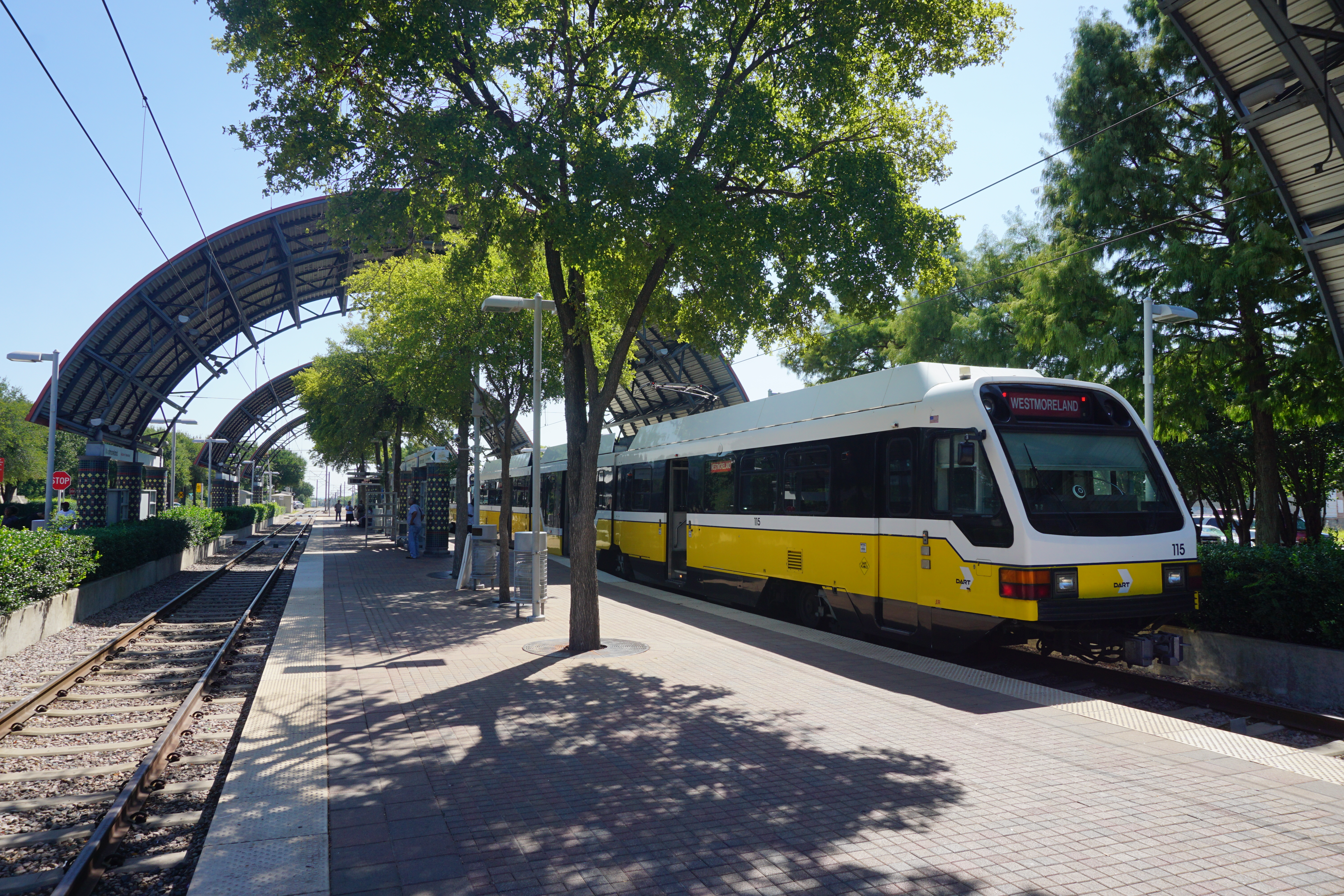

General information
- Location: 2646 South Westmoreland Road; Dallas, Texas
- Coordinates: 32°43′11″N 96°52′18.5″W
- System: DART rail
- Owner: Dallas Area Rapid Transit
- Platforms: Island platform
- Tracks: 2
- Connections: DART: 25, 57, 104, 108, 221, 223, Mountain Creek GoLink Zone (M-Sun)

Construction
- Structure type: At-grade
- Parking: 672 spaces
- Cycle facilities: 4 lockers, 4 racks
- Accessible: Yes

History
- Opened: June 14, 1996

Passengers
- FY 2025: 1,771 (avg. weekday) ▲6.5%

Services
Preceding station	DART	Following station
Terminus	Red Line	Hampton toward Parker Road
Location

Westmoreland station is a DART rail station in southern Dallas, Texas. It is located in the Oak Cliff neighborhood at the intersection of Illinois Avenue and Westmoreland Road near L.V. Stockard Middle School. The station is the southwestern terminus of the Red Line.

The station serves the area's residential and industrial corridors. Bus routes connect the station to Dallas College Mountain View Campus and the Shops at RedBird mall.

The station opened with the DART rail system on June 14, 1996.
