= List of DART bus routes =

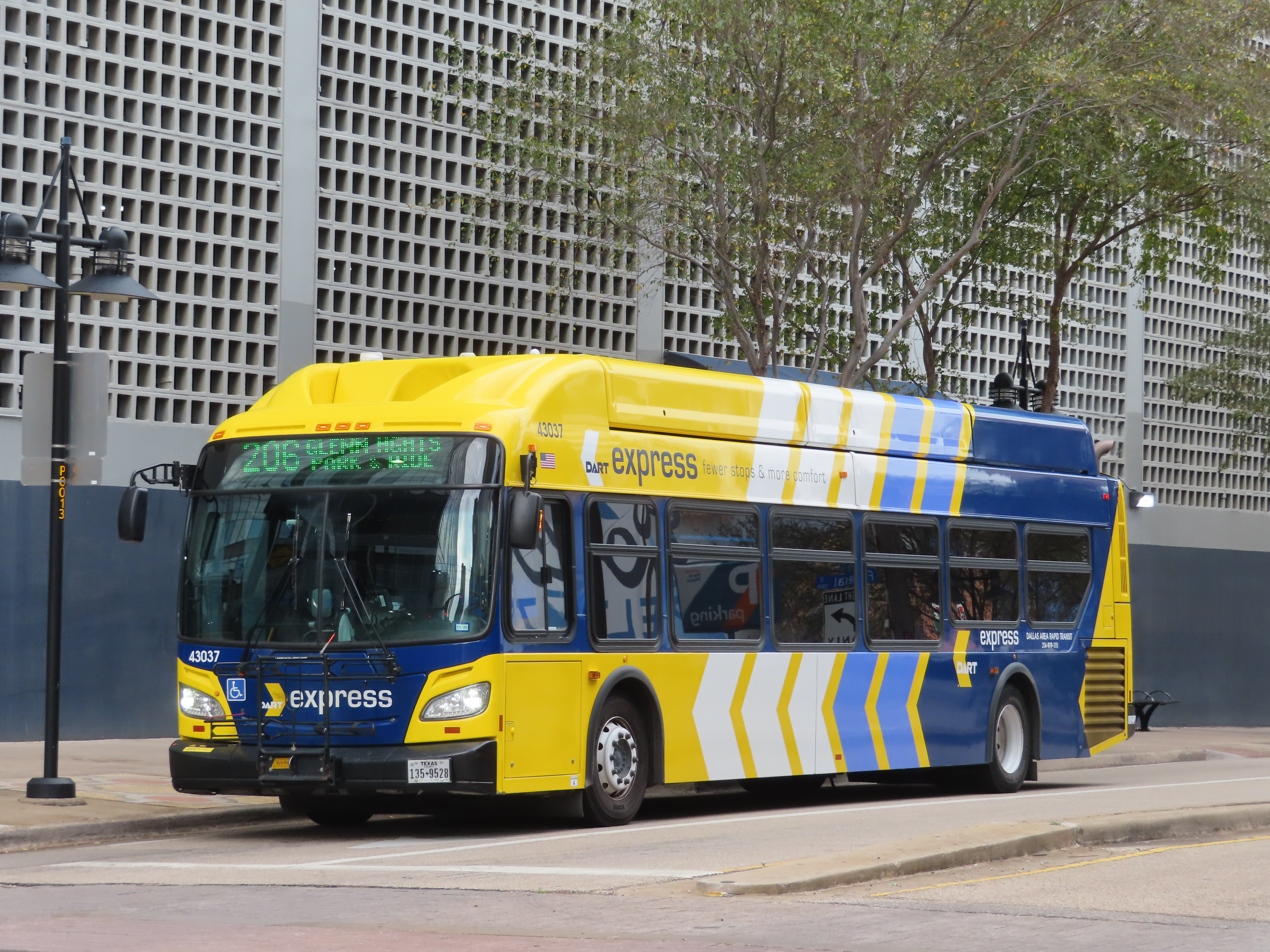
Bus #43037 on route 206 (now 306) in Downtown Dallas

Dallas Area Rapid Transit operates numerous bus routes across 13 cities in the Dallas–Fort Worth metroplex with varying levels of frequency, including express and shuttle services. In 2024, the service had a ridership of 30,137,900, or about 88,900 per weekday as of the third quarter of 2025.

== Local ==
- Yellow denotes 15-20 minute midday frequency
- Purple denotes 30 minute midday frequency
- Blue denotes 40-60 minute midday frequency

Route Name	Terminal 1	Terminal 2	via	Length	Major Connections	Notes
1 Malcolm X / Maple	Medical District; Southwestern Medical District/Parkland station	Bonton; Samoa Ave. at Bexar St.	Maple Ave., Malcolm X Blvd., Bexar St.	8.7 mi (14.0 km)	Red Line; Blue Line; Green Line; Orange Line	
3 Ross	Downtown; CBD West Transfer Center	Northeast Dallas; SMU/Mockingbird station	Ross Ave., Matilda St.	6.3 mi (10.1 km)	Red Line; Blue Line; Green Line; Orange Line	
5 Love Field Shuttle	Medical District; Inwood/Love Field station	Love Field; Dallas Love Field	Cedar Springs Rd. (Herb Kelleher Way)	1.7 mi (2.7 km)	Green Line; Orange Line	In addition to Love Field, services eight stations along Cedar Springs Road; Originally numbered route 55
9 Jefferson / Gaston	Junius Heights; Paulus Ave. at Gaston Ave.	Cockrell Hill; Cockrell Hill Transfer Location	Commerce St. (EB), Elm St. (WB), Gaston Ave., Jefferson Blvd.	11.9 mi (19.2 km)	Red Line; Blue Line; Green Line; Orange Line; Dallas Streetcar; Trinity Railway Express; Texas Eagle	
13 Ervay	Downtown; CBD West Transfer Center	South Dallas; J.B. Jackson Transit Center	Ervay St., Elsie Faye Heggins St.	8.6 mi (13.8 km)	Red Line; Blue Line; Green Line; Orange Line	
15 Buckner	Zacha Junction; South Garland Transit Center	Piedmont Addition/Elam; Buckner station	Peavy Rd., Buckner Blvd.	12.5 mi (20.1 km)	Green Line	
16 Ferguson	Downtown; CBD West Transfer Center	Zacha Junction; South Garland Transit Center	East R.L. Thornton Freeway (I-30), Ferguson Rd.	14.7 mi (23.7 km)	Red Line; Blue Line; Green Line; Orange Line	
17 Skillman	Northeast Dallas; SMU/Mockingbird station	Northeast Dallas; LBJ/Central station	Skillman St., Audelia Rd.	14.3 mi (23.0 km)	Red Line; Blue Line; Orange Line	
18 Samuell	Downtown; CBD West Transfer Center	Zacha Junction; South Garland Transit Center	Haskell Ave., Samuell Blvd., Shiloh Rd.	16.9 mi (27.2 km)	Red Line; Blue Line; Green Line; Orange Line	
20 Northwest Hwy	Northwest Dallas; Bachman station	Zacha Junction; South Garland Transit Center	Northwest Hwy (Loop 12), Park Ln.	17.2 mi (27.7 km)	Red Line; Blue Line; Green Line; Orange Line	
22 Forest Ln.	Addison; Addison Transit Center	Garland; Downtown Garland station	Forest Ln.	15.0 mi (24.1 km)	Red Line; Blue Line; Orange Line; Silver Line	From 5:30 AM to 10:30 PM on weekdays, the segment between Forest Lane and Forest/Jupiter stations is serviced by an additional bus
23 Haskell	Medical District; Southwestern Medical District/Parkland station	South Dallas; J.B. Jackson Transit Center	Haskell Ave. (EB), Peak St. (WB)	6.8 mi (10.9 km)	Red Line; Blue Line; Green Line; Orange Line; M-Line Trolley	
25 Cockrell Hill North	Oak Cliff; Westmoreland station	Downtown Irving; Downtown Irving/Heritage Crossing station	Cockrell Hill Rd.	11.5 mi (18.5 km)	Red Line; Trinity Railway Express	
27 Ridgecrest	Vickery Meadow; Park Lane station	North Dallas; Steppington Dr. at Stone Canyon Rd.	Melody Ln., Ridgecrest Dr.	5.4 mi (8.7 km)	Red Line; Orange Line	
30 Lake June	Piedmont Addition; Lake June station	Pleasant Grove; Elam Rd. at Cheyenne Rd.	Lake June Rd.	5.4 mi (8.7 km)	Green Line	
38 Ledbetter	Piedmont Addition/Elam; Buckner station	Southwest Dallas; Joseph Hardin Dr. at Country Creek Dr.	Great Trinity Forest Way (Ledbetter Dr.)	14.6 mi (23.5 km)	Blue Line; Green Line	
57 Westmoreland	Medical District; Southwestern Medical District/Parkland station	Wolf Creek; Kirnwood Dr. at Wheatland Rd.	Westmoreland Rd. (Mockingbird Ln.)	18.2 mi (29.3 km)	Red Line; Green Line; Orange Line	
101 Hampton	Medical District; Southwestern Medical District/Parkland station	Wolf Creek; Wheatland Rd. at Old Hickory Tr.	Hampton Ave. (Inwood Rd.)	17.4 mi (28.0 km)	Red Line; Green Line; Orange Line	
102 Fort Worth	Downtown; CBD East Transfer Center	North Oak Cliff; Colorado at Moulin Rouge	Elm St (WB), Fort Worth Ave. (Commerce St.)	6.3 mi (10.1 km)	Red Line; Blue Line; Green Line; Orange Line	Named after Fort Worth Avenue, not the city of Fort Worth
103 Cedar Springs	Downtown; CBD West Transfer Center	Medical Center; Inwood/Love Field station	Cedar Springs Rd.	4.3 mi (6.9 km)	Red Line; Blue Line; Green Line; Orange Line	
104 Illinois	South Dallas; J.B. Jackson Transit Center	Oak Cliff; Dallas College Mountain View Campus	Cedar Crest Blvd. (MLK Jr. Blvd.), Illinois Ave.	12.2 mi (19.6 km)	Red Line; Blue Line; Green Line	
106 Bickers	Downtown; Marilla St. at Akard St.	West Dallas/Westmoreland Heights; Bickers St. at Westmoreland Rd.	Lamar St., Bickers St.	6.7 mi (10.8 km)	Red Line; Blue Line; Green Line; Orange Line	
108 Camp Wisdom	South Dallas; Camp Wisdom station	Oak Cliff; Westmoreland station	Camp Wisdom Rd., Cockrell Hill Rd.	12.5 mi (20.1 km)	Red Line; Blue Line	
109 Beckley	Downtown; CBD East Transfer Center	Five Mile Creek; Pentagon Pkwy. at US 67)	Beckley Ave., Zang Blvd.	9.3 mi (15.0 km)	Red Line; Blue Line; Green Line; Orange Line; Dallas Streetcar	
114 East Oak Cliff	Cedar Crest; Illinois station	Cedar Crest; Illinois station	Lancaster Ave., Kiest Blvd., Illinois Ave.	11.2 mi (18.0 km)	Blue Line	Operates in a bi-directional loop
122 Brookriver / Record Crossing	Medical District; Southwestern Medical District/Parkland station	Northwest Dallas; Brookriver Dr. & Mockingbird Ln.	Record Crossing Rd. (WB), Empire Central Dr. (EB), Harry Hines Blvd.	3.1 mi (5.0 km)	Green Line; Orange Line	
128 Singleton	Downtown; Marilla St. at Akard St.	West Dallas; Walton Walker Blvd. (Loop 12) at Singleton Blvd.	Singleton Blvd.	8.5 mi (13.7 km)	Red Line; Blue Line; Green Line; Orange Line	Originally numbered route 28
141 Bonnie View	Cedar Crest; Illinois station	South Dallas; Camp Wisdom station	Bonnie View Rd.	9.4 mi (15.1 km)	Blue Line	Originally numbered route 41
145 Marsalis	Downtown; CBD East Transfer Center	South Dallas; Camp Wisdom station	Marsalis Ave.	13.0 mi (20.9 km)	Red Line; Blue Line; Green Line; Orange Line; Dallas Streetcar; Trinity Railway Express; Texas Eagle	Originally numbered route 45
147 Polk	Downtown; CBD East Transfer Center	Wolf Creek; Kirnwood Dr. at Wheatland Rd.	Polk St., Wheatland Rd.	15.2 mi (24.5 km)	Red Line; Blue Line; Green Line; Orange Line; Dallas Streetcar; Trinity Railway Express; Texas Eagle	Originally numbered route 47
200 Spring Valley	Addison; Addison Transit Center	Garland; Downtown Garland station	Spring Valley Rd., Walnut St.	16.9 mi (27.2 km)	Red Line; Blue Line; Orange Line; Silver Line	Interlined with 202 between Addison Transit Center and Spring Valley station
202 Buckingham	Addison; Addison Transit Center	Garland; Downtown Garland station	Spring Valley Rd., Buckingham Rd.	16.6 mi (26.7 km)	Red Line; Blue Line; Orange Line; Silver Line	Interlined with 200 between Addison Transit Center and Spring Valley station
203 Centerville	Zacha Junction; South Garland Transit Center	Garland; Downtown Garland station	Centerville Rd., First St.	6.2 mi (10.0 km)	Blue Line	
204 Miller	Lake Highlands; LBJ/Skillman station	Zacha Junction; South Garland Transit Center	Miller Rd.	6.2 mi (10.0 km)	Blue Line	
205 Henderson	Downtown; CBD West Transfer Center	Park Cities/Northeast Dallas; SMU/Mockingbird station	Live Oak St, Henderson Ave., Central Expy. (US 75)	6.6 mi (10.6 km)	Red Line; Blue Line; Green Line; Orange Line; M-Line Trolley	Originally numbered route 105
207 Lemmon	Downtown; CBD West Transfer Center	West Dallas; Diplomacy Rd. at Regal Row	Elm St. (SB), San Jacinto St (NB), Lemmon Ave., Regal Row, Thurston Dr.	13.4 mi (21.6 km)	Red Line; Blue Line; Green Line; Orange Line; M-Line Trolley	
212 La Prada	Zacha Junction; South Garland Transit Center	Garland/Rose Hill; Lake Ray Hubbard Transit Center	Woodmeadow Pkwy., La Prada Dr., Duck Creek Pkwy.	7.4 mi (11.9 km)		
213 Harry Hines	Medical District; Southwestern Medical District/Parkland station	Northwest Dallas; Bachman station	Harry Hines Blvd.	4.4 mi (7.1 km)	Green Line; Orange Line	
214 Lindsley	Downtown; Young St at Record St	Zacha Junction; South Garland Transit Center	Elm St. (WB), Commerce St.(EB), Lindsley Ave., Garland Rd.	12.1 mi (19.5 km)	Red Line; Blue Line; Green Line; Orange Line; Dallas Streetcar; Trinity Railway Express; Texas Eagle	
215 Kiest	Cedar Crest; 8th & Corinth station	Five Mile Creek; Pentagon Pkwy. at Polk St.	Kiest Blvd.	8.3 mi (13.4 km)	Red Line; Blue Line	
216 Everglade	South Dallas; J.B. Jackson Transit Center	Buckner Terrace/Everglade Park; Forney Rd. at Buckner Blvd.	Second St., Elsie Faye Heggins St., Everglade Rd.	9.6 mi (15.4 km)	Green Line	
217 Lancaster / Ramona	Cedar Crest; 8th & Corinth station	South Dallas; Ledbetter station	Corinth St., Lancaster St., Ramona Ave.	6.3 mi (10.1 km)	Red Line; Blue Line	
218 Military	Piedmont Addition/Parkdale Heights; Lawnview station	Piedmont Addition; Lake June station	Military Pkwy., Masters Dr., Bruton Rd.	12.9 mi (20.8 km)	Green Line	
219 Sylvan	Medical District; Southwestern Medical District/Parkland station	Elmwood/Wynnewood North; Tyler/Vernon station	Sylvan Ave., Tyler St.	6.6 mi (10.6 km)	Red Line; Green Line; Orange Line	
220 Scyene	Piedmont Addition/Parkdale Heights; Lawnview station	Riverway Estates/Bruton Terrace; St. Augustine Rd. at Bruton Rd.	Scyene Rd. (SH 352)	5.2 mi (8.4 km)	Green Line	
221 Merrifield	Oak Cliff; Westmoreland station	Cockrell Hill; Cockrell Hill Transfer Location	Kiest Blvd., Duncanville Rd.	11.5 mi (18.5 km)	Red Line	
223 Clark	Oak Cliff; Westmoreland station	Duncanville; Clark Rd. at Cloverglen Dr.	Illinois Ave., Patriot Pkwy. (Spur 408), Clark Rd.	10.0 mi (16.1 km)	Red Line	
224 I-30/Broadway	Downtown; CBD East Transfer Center	Garland; Downtown Garland station	East R.L. Thornton Freeway (I-30), Broadway Blvd., Dairy Rd.	22.3 mi (35.9 km)	Red Line; Blue Line; Green Line; Orange Line; Dallas Streetcar; Trinity Railway Express; Texas Eagle	
226 Clarendon	Cedar Crest; 8th & Corinth station	Cockrell Hill; Cockrell Hill Transfer Location	Eighth St., Clarendon Dr.	7.6 mi (12.2 km)	Red Line; Blue Line	
227 O'Connor / Luna / Valley View	Downtown Irving; Downtown Irving/Heritage Crossing station	Addison; Addison Transit Center	O'Connor Rd., Valley View Ln., Alpha Rd., Montfort Dr.	22.4 mi (36.0 km)	Green Line; Orange Line; Silver Line; Trinity Railway Express	
228 Simpson Stuart	South Dallas; Camp Wisdom station	South Dallas; Tioga St. at Bonnie View Rd.	Simpson Stuart Rd.	4.4 mi (7.1 km)	Blue Line	
229 MacArthur / Belt Line	Downtown Irving; Downtown Irving/Heritage Crossing station	Addison; Addison Transit Center	MacArthur Blvd., Belt Line Rd.	21.8 mi (35.1 km)	Green Line; Orange Line; Silver Line; Trinity Railway Express	
230 Irving Blvd.	Downtown; CBD East Transfer Center	Euless; DFW Remote South Parking	Irving Blvd.	21.9 mi (35.2 km)	Red Line; Blue Line; Green Line; Orange Line; Trinity Railway Express	DFW Airport's terminals can be accessed via shuttle from DFW Remote South Parking
231 Belt Line South	Downtown Irving; Downtown Irving/Heritage Crossing station	Las Colinas; Dallas College North Lake Campus station	Shady Grove Rd., Belt Line Rd., Walnut Hill Ln.	10.5 mi (16.9 km)	Orange Line; Trinity Railway Express	
232 Frankford	Carrollton; Trinity Mills station	Richardson; CityLine/Bush station	Frankford Rd.	15.4 mi (24.8 km)	Red Line; Green Line; Orange Line; Silver Line; A-train	
233 Josey	Northwest Dallas; Bachman station	Hebron; Arbor Creek Dr. at Cheyenne Dr.	Webb Chapel Ext., Webb Chapel Rd., Josey Ln.	16.2 mi (26.1 km)	Green Line; Orange Line	
234 Parker	Plano; Parker Road station	Northwest Plano; Northwest Plano Park and Ride	Parker Rd., Preston Rd.	11.2 mi (18.0 km)	Red Line; Orange Line	
235 Timberglen / Midway	Addison; Addison Transit Center	Northeast Carrollton; Hebron Pkwy. at International Pkwy.	Midway Rd. (NB), Marsh Ln. (SB), Trinity Mills Rd., Addison Rd.	7.6 mi (12.2 km)	Silver Line	
236 West 15th	Addison; Addison Transit Center	Plano; Parker Road station	Preston Rd., Plano Pkwy., West 15th St.	15.1 mi (24.3 km)	Red Line; Orange Line; Silver Line	
237 Preston	Downtown; CBD West Transfer Center	Addison; Addison Transit Center	Preston Rd.	14.8 mi (23.8 km)	Red Line; Blue Line; Green Line; Orange Line; Silver Line; M-Line Trolley	
238 Arapaho / Naaman Forest	Addison; Addison Transit Center	Garland; Downtown Garland station	Arapaho Rd., Naaman Forest Blvd. (Naaman School Rd.)	18.8 mi (30.3 km)	Red Line; Blue Line; Orange Line; Silver Line	
239 Dallas / Addison / Legacy	Downtown; CBD West Transfer Center	Northwest Plano; Northwest Plano Park and Ride	Dallas North Tollway, Addison Rd., Communications Pkwy.	23.4 mi (37.7 km)	Red Line; Blue Line; Green Line; Orange Line; Silver Line; M-Line Trolley	
241 Coit	Northeast Dallas; Forest Lane station	Northwest Plano; Northwest Plano Park and Ride	Coit Rd., Preston Rd.	19.1 mi (30.7 km)	Red Line; Orange Line	
242 Walnut Hill	Lake Highlands; Lake Highlands station	Zacha Junction; South Garland Transit Center	Walnut Hill Ln.	5.7 mi (9.2 km)	Blue Line	
243 Plano Rd.	Richardson; Arapaho Center station	Lake Highlands; LBJ/Skillman station	Plano Rd.	6.7 mi (10.8 km)	Red Line; Blue Line; Orange Line	
244 UTD / Campbell	Richardson; Arapaho Center station	Northwest Richardson; UT Dallas station	Campbell Rd.	4.8 mi (7.7 km)	Red Line; Orange Line; Silver Line	
245 Shiloh	Richardson; CityLine/Bush station	Zacha Junction; South Garland Transit Center	Shiloh Rd.	15.0 mi (24.1 km)	Red Line; Blue Line; Orange Line; Silver Line	
247 Jupiter	Plano; Parker Road station	Zacha Junction; South Garland Transit Center	Jupiter Rd.	14.7 mi (23.7 km)	Red Line; Blue Line; Orange Line; Silver Line	
249 Columbia	Downtown; CBD West Transfer Center	Park Cities/Northeast Dallas; SMU/Mockingbird station	Elm St. (WB), Commerce St (EB), Columbia Ave., Abrams Rd.	7.8 mi (12.6 km)	Red Line; Blue Line; Green Line; Orange Line	
250 Belt Line East	Addison; Addison Transit Center	Garland; Downtown Garland station	Belt Line Rd.	15.7 mi (25.3 km)	Red Line; Blue Line; Orange Line; Silver Line	
251 Saturn	Zacha Junction; South Garland Transit Center	Garland; Downtown Garland station	Saturn Rd., First St.	6.3 mi (10.1 km)	Blue Line	

== Express and Shuttle ==
- Pink denotes express routes. Express routes provide direct service from Downtown Dallas to the furthest suburbs and generally have few stops. Only operate on weekdays.
- Green denotes shuttle routes.

Route Name	Terminal 1	Terminal 2	via	Length	Major Connections	Notes
306 Glenn Heights Express	Medical District; Southwestern Medical District/Parkland station	Glenn Heights; Glenn Heights Park and Ride	South R.L. Thornton Freeway (I-35E)	20.8 mi (33.5 km)	Red Line; Blue Line; Green Line; Orange Line; M-Line Trolley	
308 Northwest Plano Express	Cedars; Cedars station	Northwest Plano; Northwest Plano Park and Ride	Dallas North Tollway	23.3 mi (37.5 km)	Red Line; Blue Line; Green Line; Orange Line; M-Line Trolley	
408 Palisades E-Shuttle (Galatyn Park Shuttle)	Richardson; Galatyn Park station	Richardson; Palisades Business Center		2.5 mi (4.0 km)	Red Line; Orange Line	
413 TI Shuttle-Forest Ln. Campus	Northeast Dallas; LBJ/Central station	Northeast Dallas; LBJ/Central station		2.6 mi (4.2 km)	Red Line; Orange Line	Operates in a loop via the Texas Instruments campus on Forest Lane
417 TI Shuttle-Main Campus North Route	Northeast Dallas; LBJ/Central station	Northeast Dallas; LBJ/Central station		2.5 mi (4.0 km)	Red Line; Orange Line	Operates in a loop via the northern half of the main Texas Instruments campus
419 TI Shuttle-Main Campus South Route	Northeast Dallas; LBJ Central station	Northeast Dallas; LBJ Central station		3.1 mi (5.0 km)	Red Line; Orange Line	Operates in a loop via the southern half of the main Texas Instruments campus
422 UT Southwestern South	Medical District; Medical/Market Center station	Medical District; Medical/Market Center station		2.2 mi (3.5 km)	Green Line; Orange Line	Operates in a loop via Southwestern Medical District/Parkland station
423 UT Southwestern North	Medical District; Medical/Market Center station	Medical District; Medical/Market Center station		4.2 mi (6.8 km)	Green Line; Orange Line	Operates in a loop via UT Southwestern North Campus and Bass Center
440 SMU Red Express	The Village; Amesbury Dr. at Southwestern Blvd.	Park Cities; Bishop Blvd. at SMU Turnaround	Amesbury Dr. (WB), Greenville Ave.	4.2 mi (6.8 km)	Red Line; Blue Line; Orange Line	
442 SMU Blue Express	Park Cities; East Dyer St. at Central Expy. (US 75)	Park Cities; East Dyer St. at Central Expy. (US 75)	SMU Blvd., Hillcrest Ave.	3.1 mi (5.0 km)		Operates in a loop via Southern Methodist University
883 UT Dallas Combined	Richardson; CityLine/Bush station	Northwest Richardson; Loop Rd. at University Pkwy. (University Parkway Cir.)	Renner Rd., Synergy Park Blvd.	6.5 mi (10.5 km)	Red Line; Orange Line; Silver Line	Operates as 2 separate branches (East and West) from University Parkway Cir. On Fridays and Sundays, 883 West is extended north to a Walmart Supercenter on Mapleshade Ln. at Coit Rd.
883 UT Dallas Combined	Far North Dallas/Southwest Plano; Frankford Rd. at Osage Plaza Ct.	Northwest Richardson; Loop Rd. at University Pkwy. (University Parkway Cir.)	Campbell Rd., Meandering Way (NB), Coit Rd. (SB)	4.9 mi (7.9 km)		Operates as 2 separate branches (East and West) from University Parkway Cir. On Fridays and Sundays, 883 West is extended north to a Walmart Supercenter on Mapleshade Ln. at Coit Rd.

== Discontinued ==
Route Name	Route description	Discontinued	Notes
209 McKinney/Cole	West Transfer Center to SMU/Mockingbird station via Cole St. and McKinney Ave.	February 2, 2026	Discontinued in favor of GoLink service.
222 Regal Row/Record Crossing	Inwood/Love Field station to West Dallas via Regal Row, Forest Park Rd. and Empire Central Pl.	September 16, 2024	Replaced by route 122 and an extended route 207.
225 Nursery	University of Dallas station to Downtown Irving/Heritage Crossing station via Carl Rd. and Nursery Rd.	February 2, 2026	Discontinued in favor of GoLink service.
240 Campbell	Addison Transit Center to Arapaho Center station via Arapaho Road and Campbell Road	June 10, 2024	Replaced by route 244 and a realigned route 238.
254 Legacy	Parker Road station and Northwest Plano Park & Ride via Legacy Dr.	February 2, 2026	Discontinued in favor of route 234 and GoLink service.
255 Story	Downtown Irving/Heritage Crossing station to Dallas College North Lake Campus station via Story Blvd.	February 2, 2026	Discontinued in favor of GoLink service.
305 Addison Express	Addison station to Downtown Dallas via Dallas North Tollway	February 2, 2026	Discontinued in favor of the non-express route 239.
378 Red Bird Express	Red Bird Transit Center to Downtown Dallas via US 67 and I-35E	February 2, 2026	Discontinued in favor of the non-express route 101.
383 Lake Ray Hubbard Express	Lake Ray Hubbard Transit Center to Downtown Dallas via I-30	February 2, 2026	Discontinued in favor of the non-express route 224.
402 NorthPark Shuttle	Park Lane station to NorthPark Center	September 15, 2025	Discontinued in favor of route 20.
412 Medical City E-Shuttle	Forest Lane station to Medical City Dallas Hospital	July 31, 2024	Discontinued in favor of routes 22 and 241.
434 Parkland Harry Hines	Loop around Parkland Memorial Hospital campus	October 31, 2022	Discontinued at the request of Parkland Health, which had financed the route.
435 Parkland Medical/Market Center	Medical/Market Center station to SWMD/Parkland station	October 31, 2022	Discontinued at the request of Parkland Health, which had financed the route.
436 Parkland Empire Central	SWMD/Parkland station to off-site Parkland Health offices	August 17, 2022	Discontinued at the request of Parkland Health, which had financed the route.
