= Hidden Ridge station =

DART rail station located in the Las Colinas development of Irving, Texas

Hidden Ridge
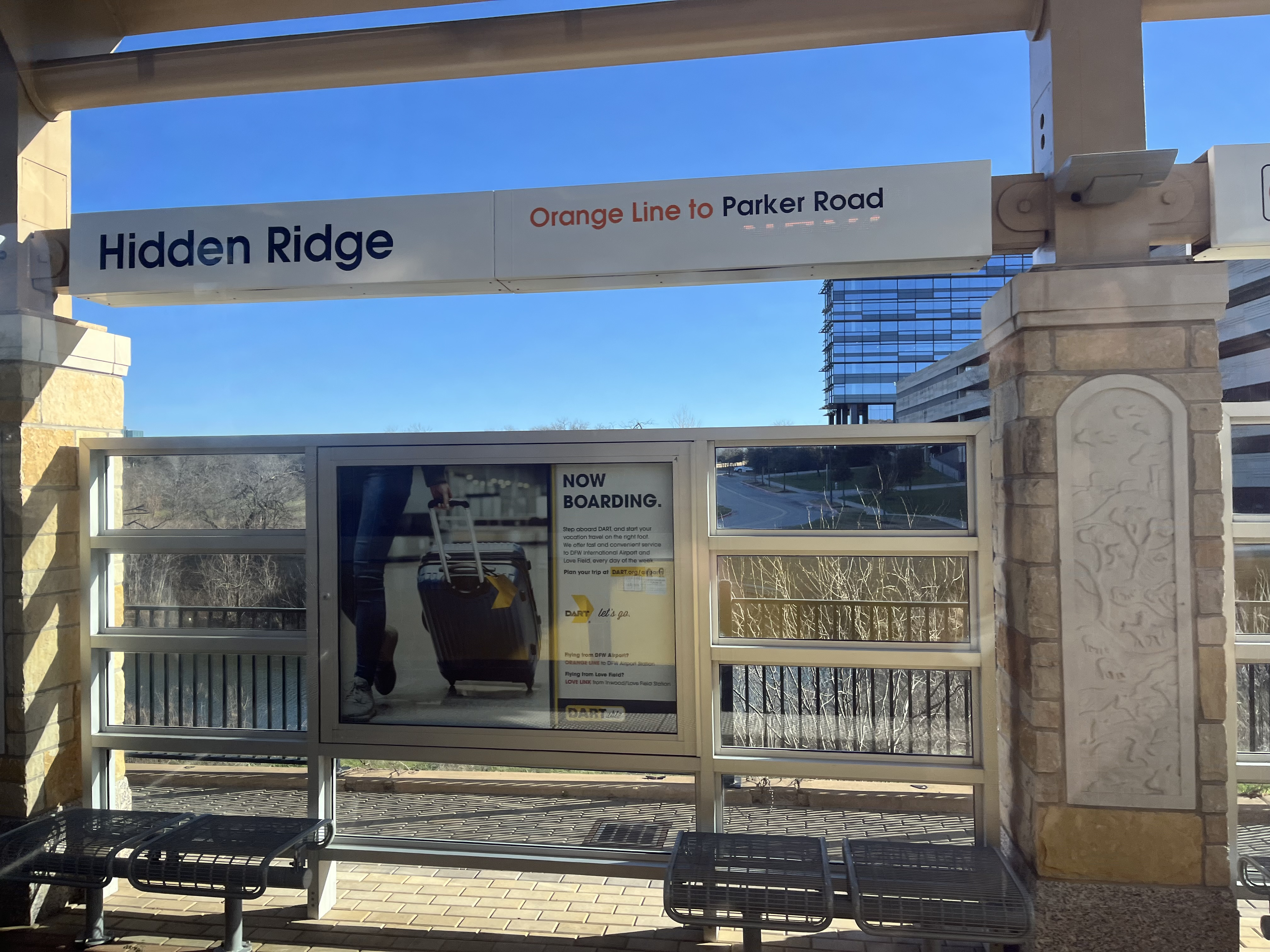

General information
- Location: 700 Meadow Creek Drive; Irving, Texas
- Coordinates: 32.882213°N 96.954293°W
- System: DART rail
- Owner: Dallas Area Rapid Transit
- Platforms: 2 side platforms

Construction
- Structure type: At grade
- Parking: 136 spaces
- Cycle facilities: 1 bike rack
- Accessible: Yes

History
- Opened: April 12, 2021

Services
Preceding station	DART	Following station
Dallas College North Lake Campus toward DFW Airport Terminal A	Orange Line	Irving Convention Center toward LBJ/Central or Parker Road
Location

Hidden Ridge station is a DART rail station located in the Las Colinas development of Irving, Texas. The station serves the Orange Line. The station is located at the intersection of Meadow Creek Drive and Green Park Drive and is named for the nearby Hidden Ridge development.

== History ==
The station, originally named Carpenter Ranch, was one of eight stations included in the original Northwest Corridor proposal, where it was expected serve nearby hotels and offices and a potential transit-oriented development project. The station was set to open in December 2012 (alongside the North Lake College and Belt Line stations) and a sculptor, Marty Ray, was hired to create decorative columns and windscreens. However, in April 2010, DART opted to defer the station due to a lack of surrounding development.

In 2017, telecom company Verizon Communications announced plans for Hidden Ridge, a $1 billion mixed-use development project in the land surrounding its Las Colinas office. Carpenter Ranch station, located about 0.5 miles (0.80 km) north of Verizon's office, was included in plans for the project. In 2019, the station was renamed to Hidden Ridge to further tie in to the project.

Construction began in mid-2020, with Marty Ray returning to complete the station artwork. The station opened on April 12, 2021. It was the second official infill station to be built on the DART system, the first being Lake Highlands station.
