= Dallas College North Lake Campus station =

DART rail station in Irving, Texas

Dallas College North Lake Campus
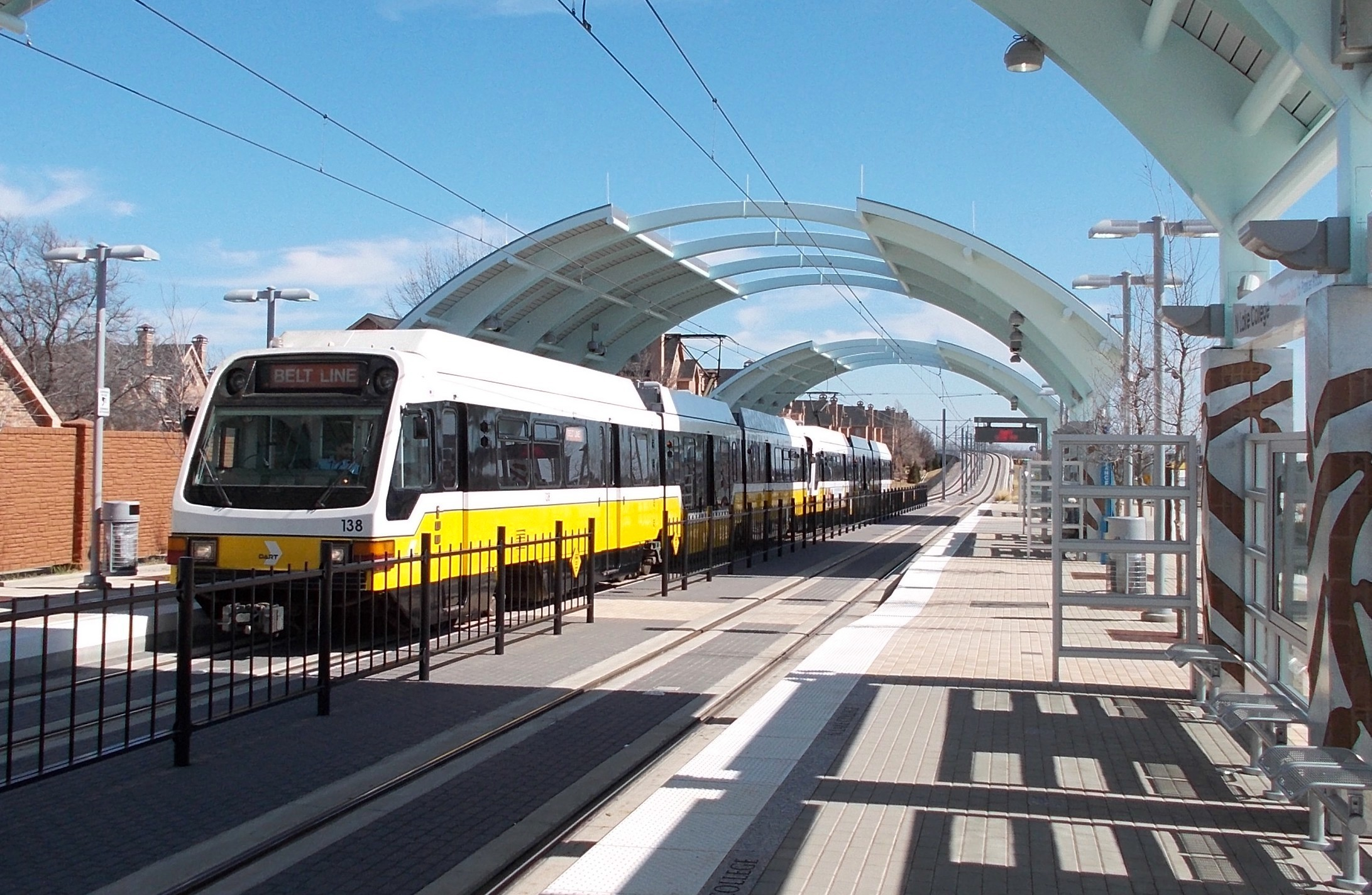
- Orange Line train awaiting departure

General information
- Location: 1770 West Walnut Hill Lane; Irving, Texas
- Coordinates: 32°52′30″N 96°58′03″W
- System: DART rail
- Owner: Dallas Area Rapid Transit
- Platforms: 2 side platforms
- Connections: DART: 229, 231; Irving Connector: 255; North Central Irving GoLink Zone (M-Sun)

Construction
- Structure type: At-grade
- Parking: 194 spaces
- Cycle facilities: 1 bike rack
- Accessible: Yes

History
- Opened: December 3, 2012
- Former names: North Lake College

Passengers
- FY 2025: 405 (avg. weekday) ▲0.5%

Services
Preceding station	DART	Following station
Belt Line toward DFW Airport Terminal A	Orange Line	Hidden Ridge toward LBJ/Central or Parker Road
Location

Dallas College North Lake Campus station (formerly North Lake College station) is a DART rail station in the Las Colinas development of Irving, Texas. The station is on the Orange Line and serves Dallas College North Lake Campus.

The station's artwork and landscaping, which depicts mesquite trees, was designed by former North Lake College instructor Chris Fulmer.

== History ==
On July 30, 2012, the first phase of the Orange Line, which ran from Bachman to Irving Convention Center, opened. As part of the opening, three bus routes were moved from North Irving Transit Center to the future North Lake College station.

On December 3, 2012, Orange Line service was extended to North Lake College and Belt Line.

In 2020, the Dallas County Community College District announced that it would merge its seven constituent institutions, including North Lake College, into a single institution, Dallas College. Following the merger, North Lake College was renamed to Dallas College North Lake Campus. On October 12, 2021, following a request from Dallas College, North Lake College station was also renamed.
