= 2012 in rail transport in the United States =

The following are events related to rail transportation in the United States that happened in 2012.

== March ==
- (Pennsylvania) 25 March – The North Shore Connector extension of the Pittsburgh Light Rail system opens extending the system 2 stops north.

== April ==
- (Massachusetts) 23 April – Boston's MBTA Commuter Rail Providence/Stoughton Line extension to Wickford Junction station opens.
- (California) 28 April – The first phase of Los Angeles County Metropolitan Transportation Authority Expo Line opens for service. The line runs from downtown LA to Culver City with 8 new stations. The next phase of the project will extend the line to Santa Monica.
- (Illinois) 30 April – Oakton–Skokie station station on the Chicago Transit Authority's Yellow Line opens.

== June ==
- (California) 15 June – The SacRT light rail Green Line Phase 1 to River District opens with 1 new stop. A future extension is planned to extend this line to the Sacramento International Airport but is not expected to be completed until sometime during the 2020s.

== July ==
- (Florida) 28 July – Construction was completed and service commencing on the AirportLink line (now called the Orange Line) of the Miami Metrorail, extending service 1 stop southwest to Miami International Airport via the Miami Intermodal Center
- (Texas) 30 July – The DART Orange Line is extended 3 stops west from Bachman station to Irving Convention Center station.

== September ==
- 22 September – The 2001-opened Portland Streetcar system, in Portland, Oregon, inaugurates service on a second line, the "Central Loop" (or CL Line), serving the central east side. This line is now known as the A and B Loop.

== October ==
- (Washington (state)) 8 October – Seattle's Sounder commuter rail south line extension 2 stops south to South Tacoma and Lakewood opens.

== December ==
- (Texas) 3 December – Dallas Area Rapid Transit opens extensions on two lines: the Orange Line carrying passengers 2 stops west to Belt Line, and the Blue Line extension 1 stop east to the Downtown Rowlett station.
- 10 December– Utah Transit Authority's FrontRunner extends service south 7 stations from Salt Lake City to Provo. At the same time, North Temple opens as an infill station.
