= University of Dallas station =

DART rail station in Irving, Texas

University of Dallas
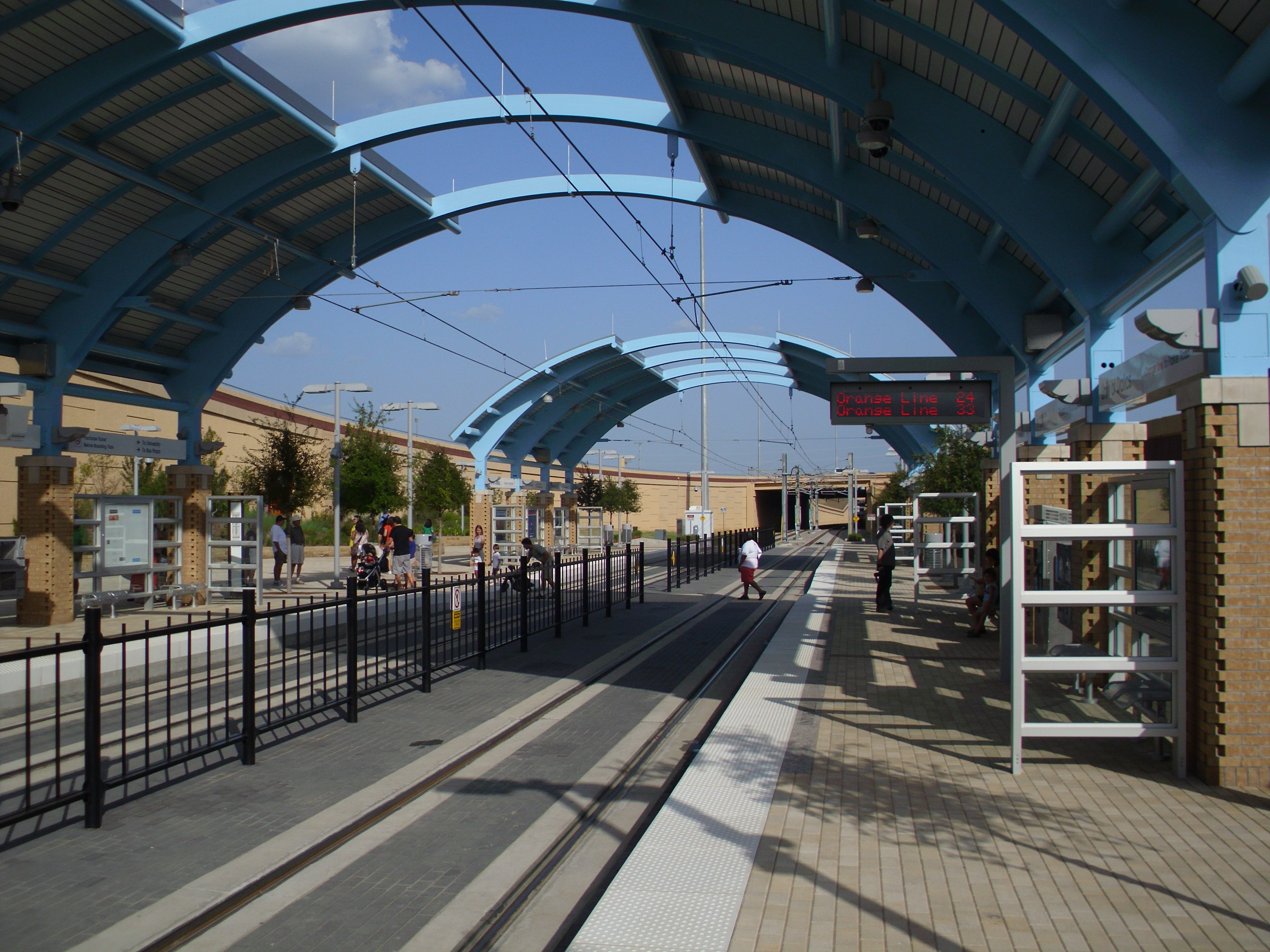

General information
- Location: 1951 E. John Carpenter Freeway (SH 114); Irving, Texas
- Coordinates: 32°50′57″N 96°54′57″W
- System: DART rail
- Owner: Dallas Area Rapid Transit
- Platforms: 2 side platforms
- Tracks: 2
- Connections: Irving Connector: 225; North Central Irving GoLink Zone (M-Sun)

Construction
- Structure type: Trenched
- Cycle facilities: 2 racks
- Accessible: Yes

History
- Opened: June 30, 2012

Passengers
- FY 2025: 177 (avg. weekday) ▼2.2%

Services
Preceding station	DART	Following station
Las Colinas Urban Center toward DFW Airport Terminal A	Orange Line	Bachman toward LBJ/Central or Parker Road
Location

University of Dallas station is a DART rail station in Irving, Texas. The station is along the northern side of John Carpenter Freeway (SH 114) next to its intersection with Tom Braniff Drive. It serves the Orange Line, a microtransit zone, and a shuttle to Downtown Irving/Heritage Crossing station.

The station consists of two levels: a bus-only transfer plaza (located at street level), and the rail platforms (located below street level). The station does not feature a parking lot or passenger drop-off area. The station's namesake, the University of Dallas, is located on the opposite side of SH 114; the west side of the rail platform includes a stairwell to a street-level pedestrian walkway across SH 114.

The station opened on July 30, 2012 as part of the Orange Line's first segment.
