= Pocket track =

Type of rail track layout

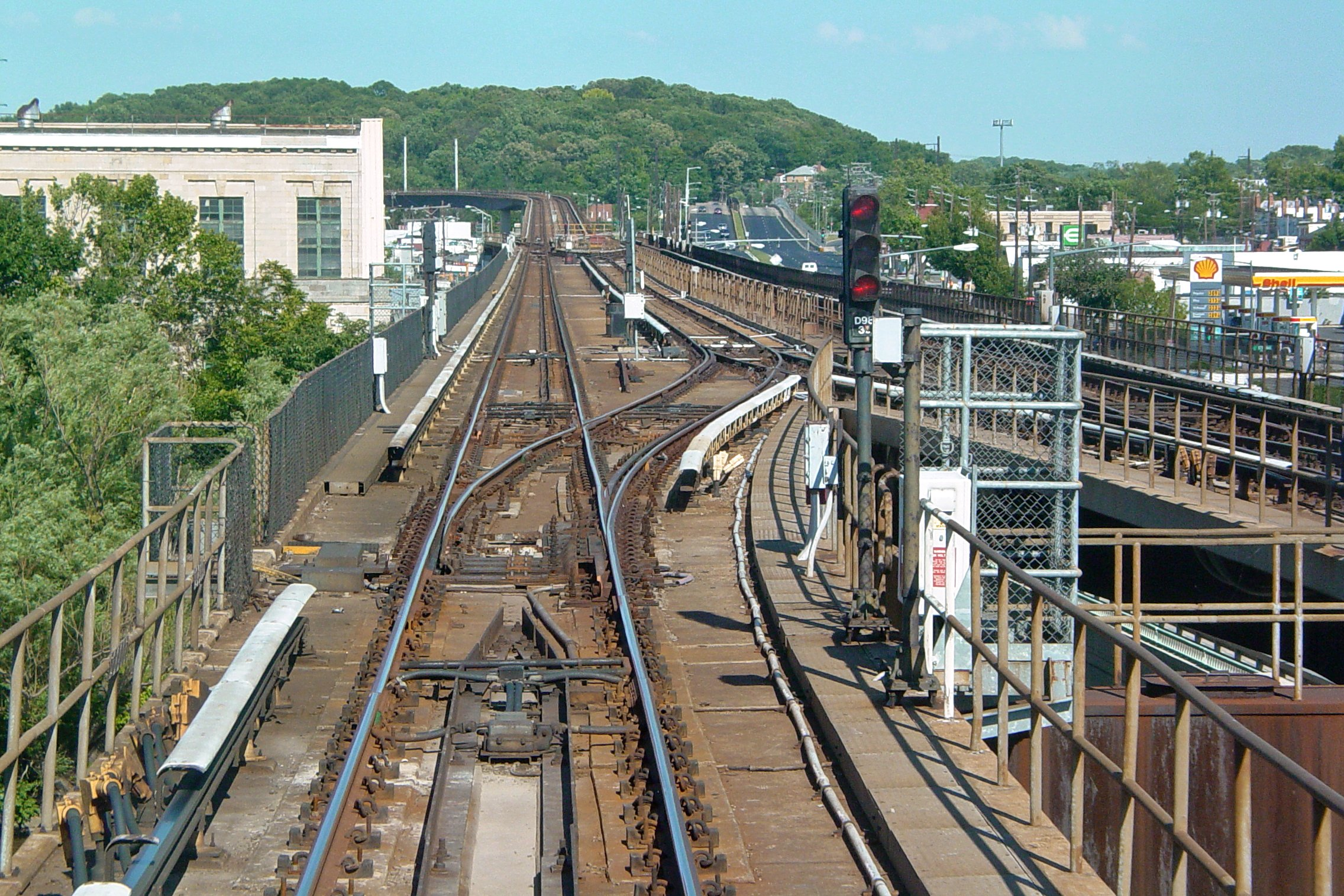
A pocket track northeast of Stadium-Armory station on the Washington Metro in May 2006

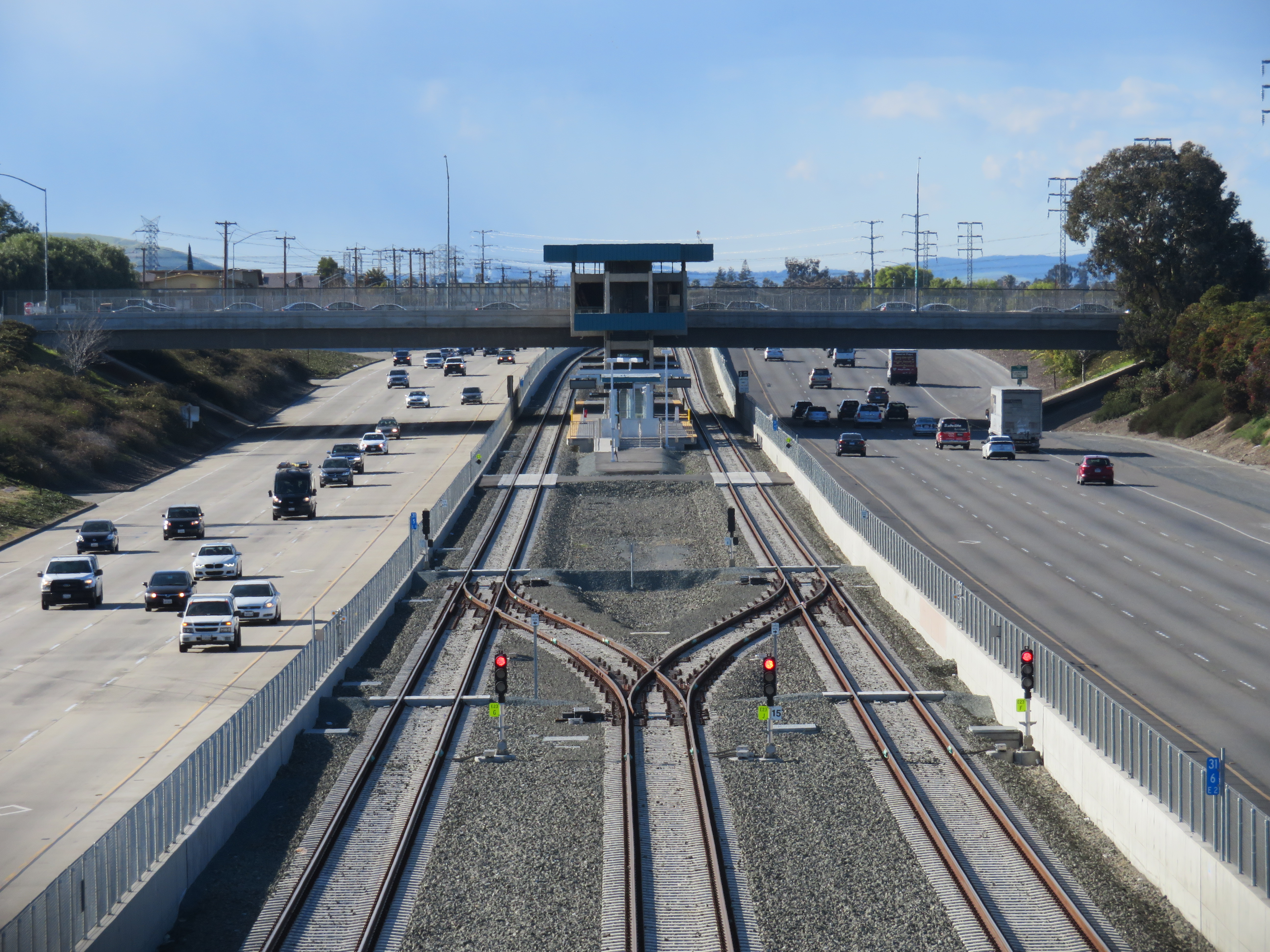
A pocket track on the eBART line in February 2018

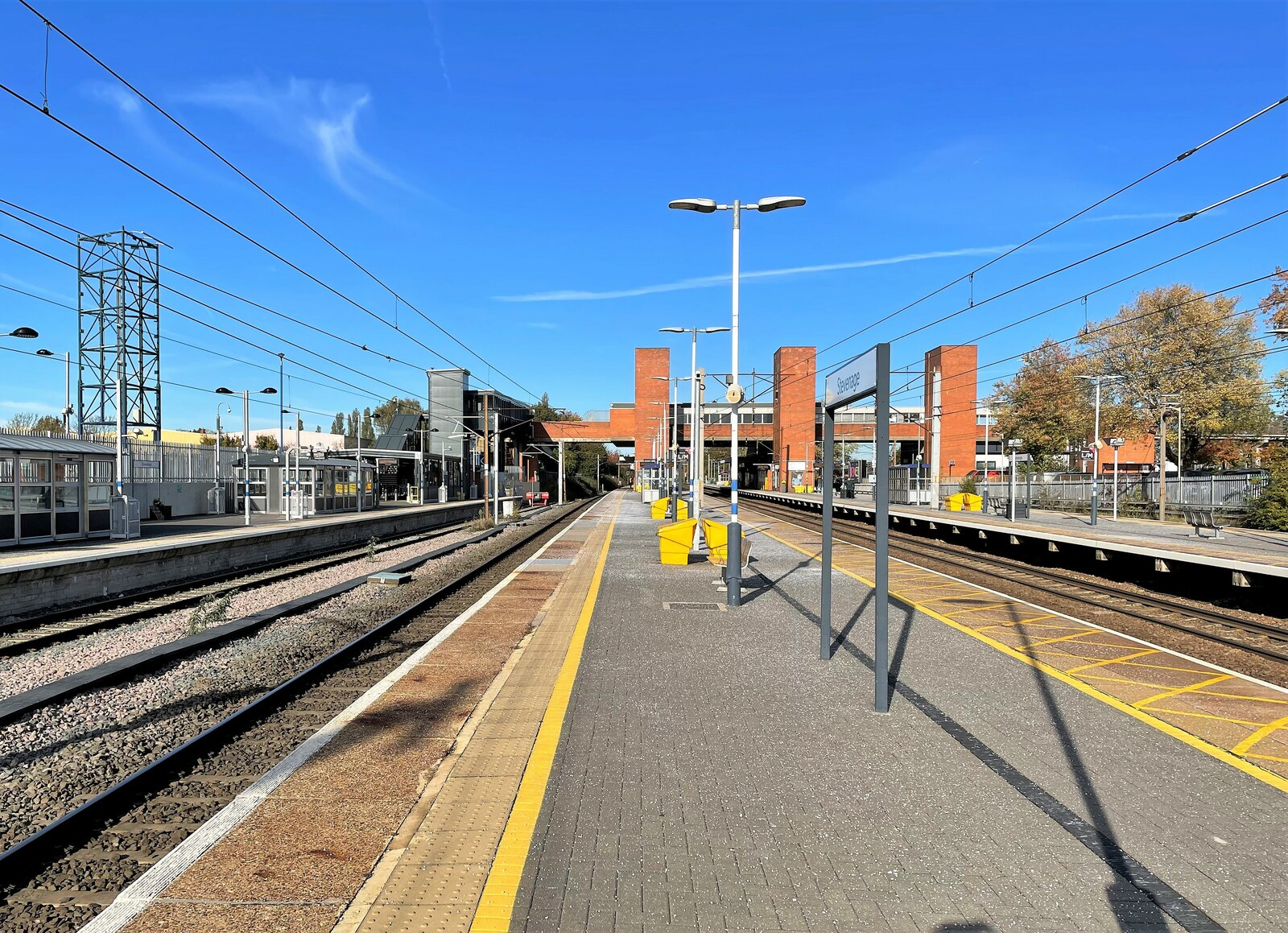
Stevenage station in November 2021 looking north, with the new platform 5 (which is on a turnback siding) on the far left

A pocket track, tail track, or reversing siding (UK: centre siding, turnback siding) is a rail track layout which allows trains to park off the main line. This type of track layout differs from a passing loop in that the pocket track is usually located between two main lines, rather than off to the side. Found primarily on metro systems, rapid transit light rail networks, and tramways, a pocket track allows certain trains or trams to change direction, even on lines with high traffic flow, while others continue through the station.

Pocket tracks also allow for the short-turning of trains, truncating services at an intermediate station to control train frequency, truncating lower ridership lines or services at an intermediate station in the case of the DART Orange Line, reversing the direction of special event trains or congestion alleviating trains, and storing trains when not in use. They are also used at terminal stations to allow for the construction of future extension of a rail track without disrupting existing service on the main tracks.

A pocket track can have a platform on it to permit turning back of trains and letting passengers change trains, such as Stevenage railway station where a new platform 5 was built on a turnback siding, or Bachman station, where the pocket track is incorporated within the station to allow for trains to terminate before heading to the yard without disrupting traffic.

Typically there will be two tracks, one for each direction of travel. The pocket track will be positioned between the two tracks, linked to both by switches, usually on both sides. Although most trains will pass through the station and continue in the same direction, an individual train may be directed into the pocket track by the control tower, before later exiting the pocket track and running in the opposite direction back into the station. This procedure allows a greater frequency of trains on a section of track closer to the city center, and reduced frequency on the suburban sections by allowing certain trains to run from the city center to intermediate stations, using pocket tracks to change direction within the flow of trains.
