= Mustangs of Las Colinas =

Bronze sculpture in Irving, Texas, U.S.

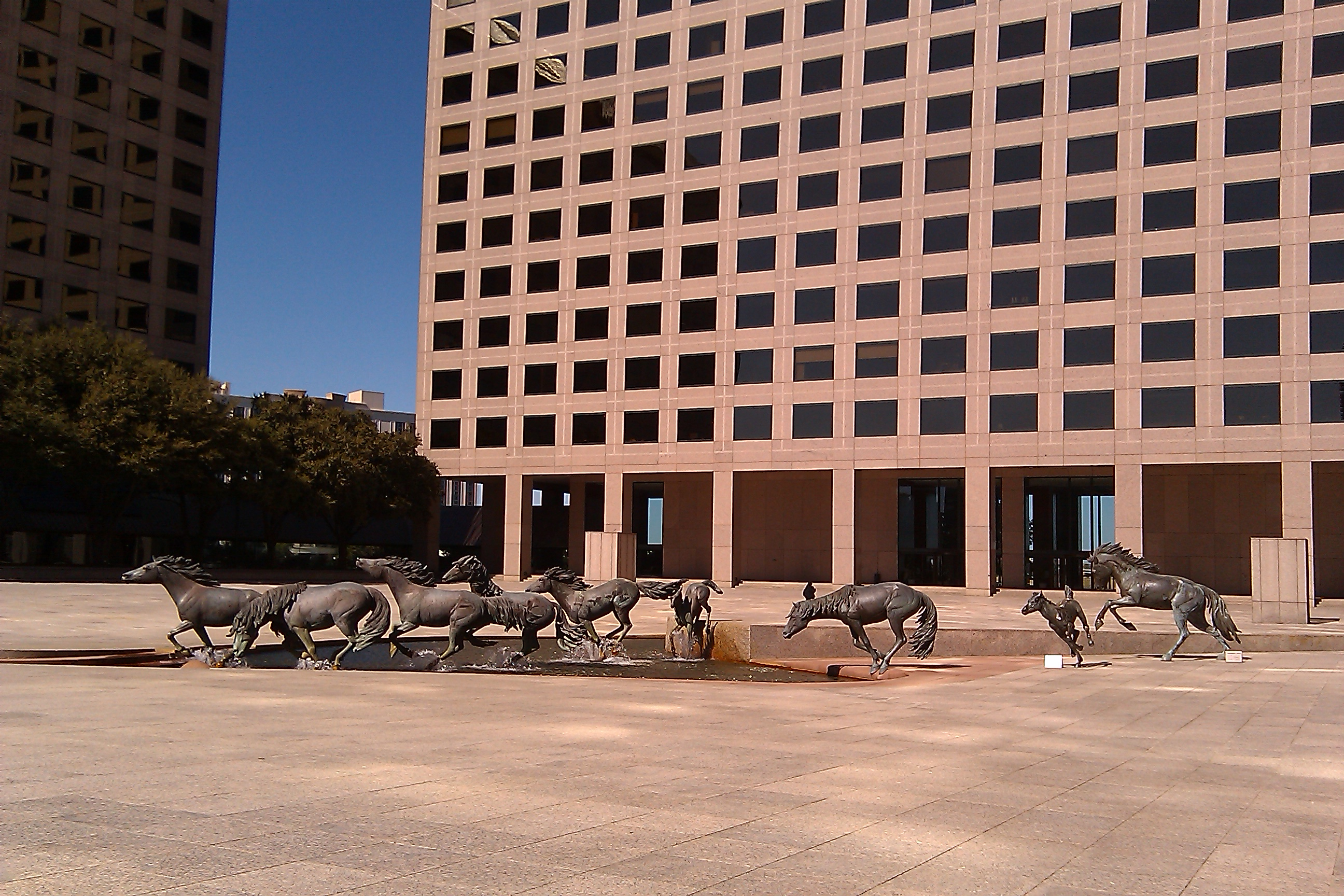
- Sculpture at Williams Square Plaza
- Artist: Robert Glen
- Year: 1976; 50 years ago (commissioned); 1984; 42 years ago (installed)
- Medium: Bronze sculpture
- Location: Williams Square; 5221 North O'Conner Boulevard; Irving, Texas, US
- 32°52′14.13″N 96°56′19.53″W
- Owner: Irving Archives and Museum
- Website: www.irvingarchivesandmuseum.com/mustangs-of-las-colinas

Mustangs of Las Colinas is a bronze sculpture by Robert Glen that decorates Williams Square in Las Colinas in Irving, Texas. It portrays a group of nine wild mustangs at 1 1/2 times life size running through a watercourse. Fountains give the effect of water splashed by the animals' hooves. The work was commissioned in 1976 and installed in 1984.

Mustangs of Las Colinas Museum is located adjacent to the sculpture, in the east building of The Towers at Williams Square. The museum has exhibits and a film about the work's creation as well as additional sculptures by Robert Glen.

Williams Square is accessible from the DART Orange Line’s stops at Las Colinas Urban Center station and Irving Convention Center station.

== Description ==
The sculpture commemorates the wild mustangs that were historically important inhabitants of much of Texas. The horses are intended to represent the drive, initiative and unfettered lifestyle that were fundamental to the state in its pioneer days.

SWA Group's design created a shallow watercourse extending 400 feet (120 m) from northeast to southwest across Williams Square, a gently sloping granite-paved open space about 300 feet (91 m) square. The plaza setting for the sculpture won a National Honor Award from the American Society of Landscape Architects.

The buildings around the square rise 358 feet (109 m) (26 floors) on the north and 217 feet (66 m) (14 floors) on the east and west sides, with the south side open to O'Connor Boulevard. The sculpture is substantial, but the scale of the surrounding structures keeps it from dominating the space.
