= Bachman station =

DART rail station in Dallas, Texas

Bachman
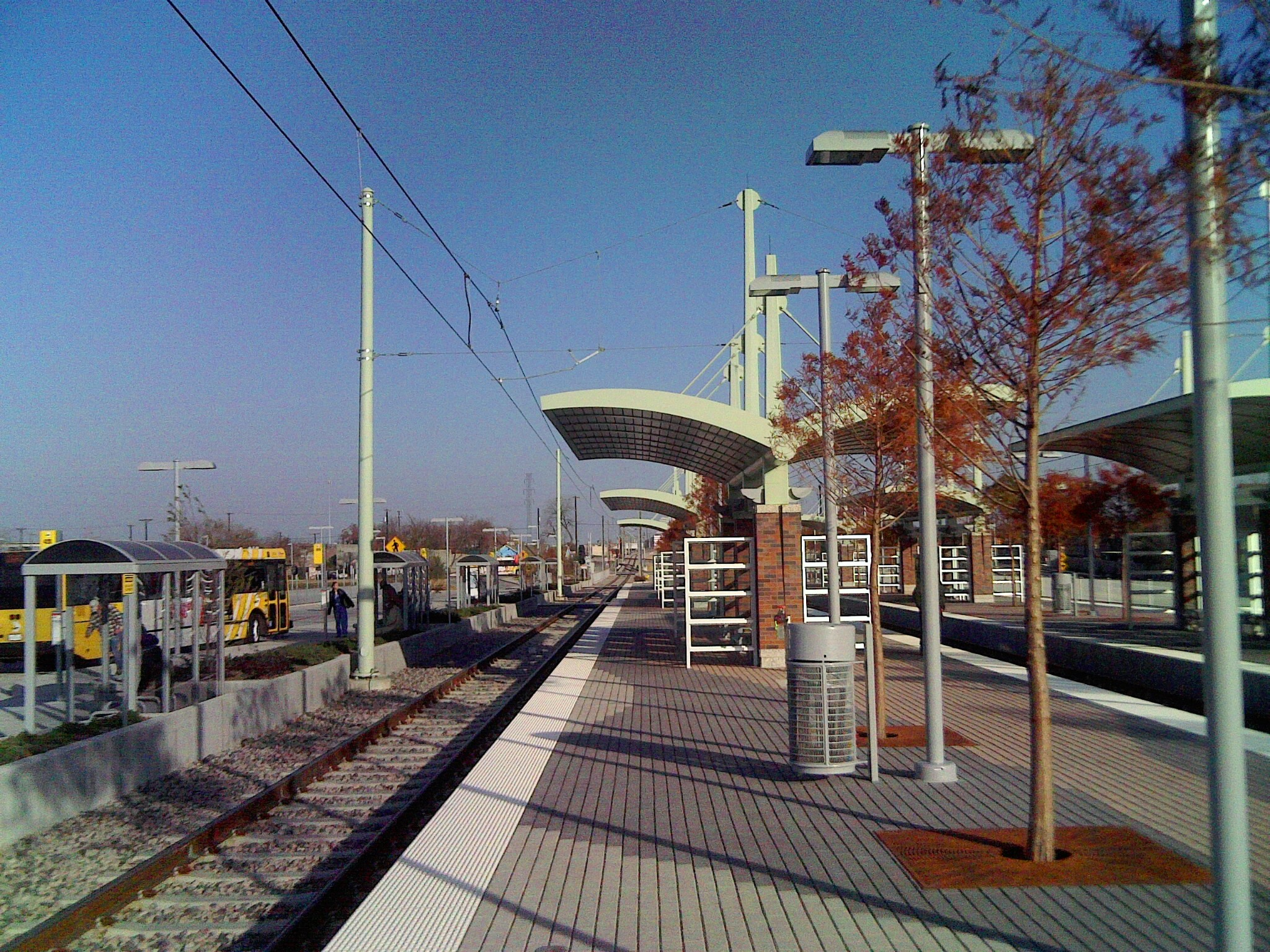
- Bachman station plattform

General information
- Location: 9739 Denton Drive; Dallas, Texas
- Coordinates: 32°51′15″N 96°52′38″W
- System: DART rail
- Owner: Dallas Area Rapid Transit
- Platforms: 2 island platforms
- Tracks: 3
- Bus stands: 8
- Connections: DART: 20, 213, 233; Northwest Dallas GoLink Zone (M-Sun)

Construction
- Structure type: At-grade
- Parking: 458 spaces
- Cycle facilities: 2 lockers, 1 rack
- Accessible: Yes

History
- Opened: December 6, 2010

Passengers
- FY 2025: 2,099 (avg. weekday) ▼0.6%

Services
Preceding station	DART	Following station
Walnut Hill/Denton toward North Carrollton/Frankford	Green Line	Burbank toward Buckner
University of Dallas toward DFW Airport Terminal A	Orange Line	Burbank toward LBJ/Central or Parker Road
Location

Bachman station is a DART rail station in Dallas, Texas. The station is located near Bachman Lake and the interchange between I-35E and Loop 12. The station serves both the Green Line and Orange Line. It is the northernmost station to serve both lines; the Green Line continues north to Carrollton, while the Orange Line continues northwest to Las Colinas and Dallas Fort Worth International Airport.

DART's Northwest Rail Operating Facility is located between Bachman and Walnut Hill/Denton station, which means that some trips terminate at the station to allow vehicles to exit service.

As of the 2025 fiscal year, the station has the highest ridership of all Green Line stations outside of Downtown Dallas and the highest Sunday ridership of all DART rail stations outside of Downtown Dallas, with an average of 2,099 riders on weekdays, 1,556 riders on Saturdays, and 1,348 riders on Sundays.

== History ==
The current Bachman station is sited on land that was purchased at the turn of the 20th century by the City of Dallas from Reverend John Bachman.

The station was opened with the northern Green Line on December 6, 2010.

In July 2014, a man was killed while trying to board a train, but was unable to do so and was pulled under the train.

In 2024, intercity bus operator Greyhound Lines announced plans for a new Dallas bus terminal, which would be located across from Bachman station on Harry Hines Boulevard. The station opened on December 8, 2025.
