= Toyota Music Factory =

Entertainment complex in Texas

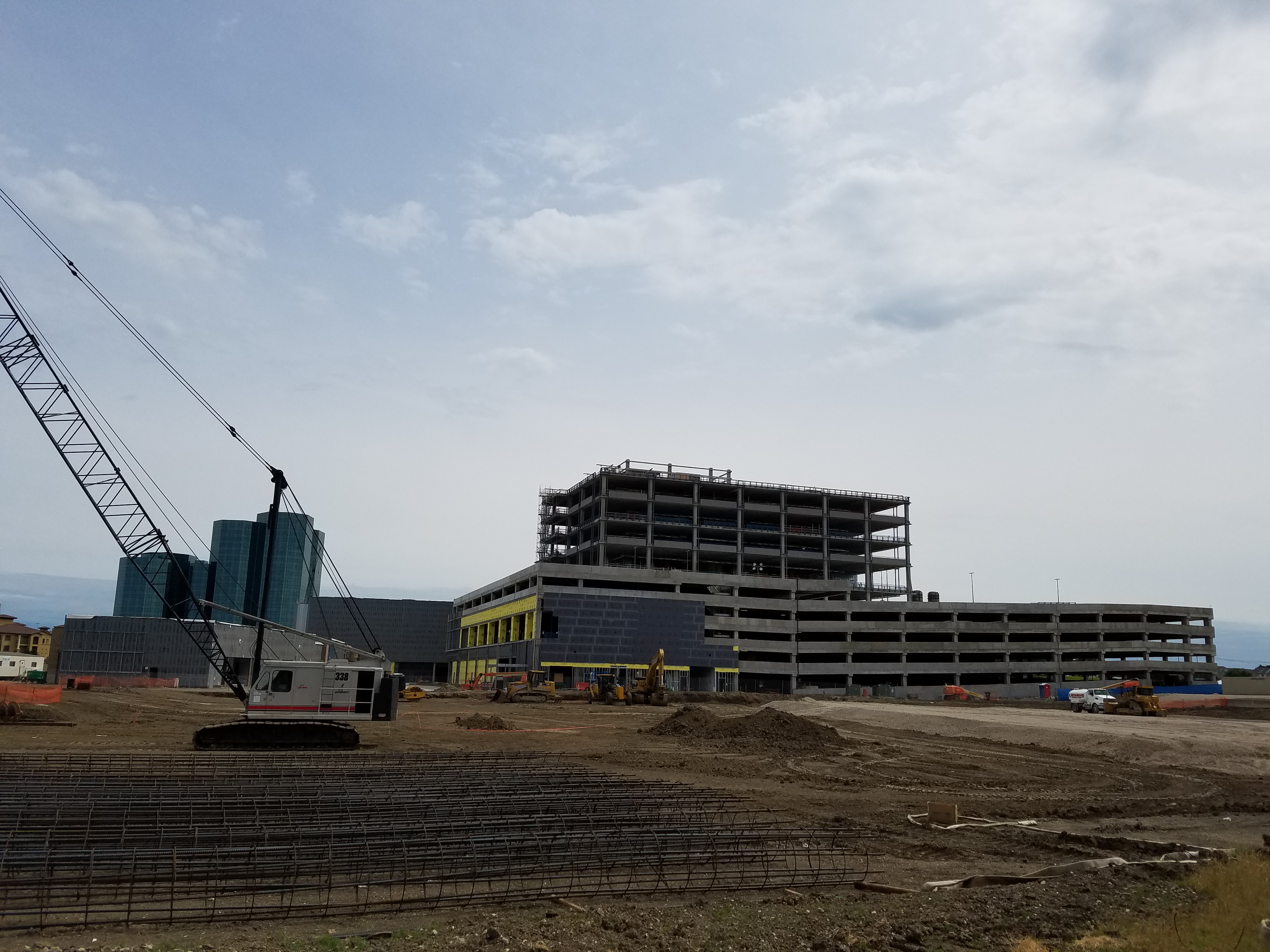
- Venue shown during construction, March 2017
- Interactive map of Toyota Music Factory
- Former names: Music Factory Entertainment Center (planning); Irving Music Factory (construction)
- Address: 300 W Las Colinas Blvd; Irving, TX 75039-5469
- Location: Las Colinas
- Coordinates: 32.873737°N 96.944930°W
- Owner: ARK Group - Noah Lazes and Richard Lazes
- Operator: Live Nation
- Capacity: 8,000 (The Pavilion—amphitheater); 4,000 (The Pavilion—indoor theater); 2,500 (The Pavilion—intimate theater); 1,500 (Texas Lottery Plaza)
- Public transit: Dallas Area Rapid Transit

Construction
- Groundbreaking: August 30, 2014
- Opened: September 9, 2017
- Cost: $175 million
- Architect: Gensler
- Project manager: ARK Group
- Structural engineer: TSA
- Services engineer: Purdy McGuire
- General contractor: Balfour Beatty
- Main contractor: Skanska

Website
- Venue Website
- Building details

Design and construction
- Civil engineer: JQ Engineering
- Other designers: Studio Outside; Scott Oldner Lighting Design; WJHW; Saunders & Associates

The Toyota Music Factory (originally known as Irving Music Factory) is an entertainment complex located in the Las Colinas neighborhood of Irving, Texas.

Developed by the ARK Group and the City of Irving, with architecture design by the Gensler firm, for roughly $US175 million, the live music venue holds more than 8,000 spectators. The development is slated to include 300,000 square feet of retail and restaurants, a 100,000 square feet concert hall and amphitheater with 8,000 capacity, an outdoor event plaza and 100,000 square feet of office space.

== History ==
In 2007, voters in Irving agreed to finance an entertainment center near Texas State Highway 114. In 2014, The ARK Group announced that a new entertainment district near the Irving Convention Center was planned for Irving, Texas.

The venue was originally scheduled to open as the "Irving Music Factory" on September 1, 2017, with a live performance by comedian Dave Chappelle. However, construction delays caused the September 1 opening to be cancelled. On September 8, The ARK Group announced that venue was being renamed the Toyota Music Factory and would open the following day with a ZZ Top concert as its inaugural event. The venue formally opened on September 9.

In January 2024, Irving's city council approved a $6.3 million renovation and redevelopment of the venue.

Since its opening, artists who have performed at Toyota Music Factory include Nine Inch Nails, Rosalía, Olivia Rodrigo, Tame Impala, Bob Dylan, Suicideboys, ZZ Top, Sting, Harry Styles, Charlie Puth, Robert Plant, J Balvin, Slayer, "Weird Al" Yankovic, and others. Local and regional artists such as Kacey Musgraves and The Chicks have also played homecoming shows at the venue. The Toyota Music Factory also hosted The Late Show with Stephen Colbert in July 2024 as part of 2024 Major League Baseball All-Star Game festivities. In June 2025, Filipino pop group BINI performed as part of the Biniverse World Tour.

== Layout ==
The complex consists of 210,000 square feet (20,000 m^{2}) of food and retail space which includes a movie theater and bowling alley. Alongside these facilities lies a 4,000-seat indoor music theatre, "The Pavilion at the Toyota Music Factory" with walls that can retract to create an open-air pavilion capable of seating an additional 4,000 people on its 65,000 square feet (6,000 m^{2}) lawn.

== Developers ==
The ARK Group

The ARK Group, owned by Noah Lazes and Richard Lazes, is a combination of companies whose focus is on mixed-use developments and entertainment zones. Previous projects include the original Music Factory in Charlotte, North Carolina and Level Entertainment Venue in Miami, Florida.

Gensler

Gensler is a global design firm with 44 offices and over 5,000 architects, interior architects, planners and designers. Previous projects include sports/entertainment district L.A. Live and MGM CityCenter. Gensler Dallas, who designed Irving's Music Factory, has a portfolio of mixed-use developments including Legacy West and The Star in Frisco.

== Entertainment ==
The Pavilion

An open-air pavilion allowing three different flexible person capacities for events. The intimate theater allows for 2,500 person capacity, the indoor theater allows for a 4,000 person capacity and an 8,000 person capacity for the amphitheater. The Pavilion additionally includes Premium seats and VIP Club and access to 20 different restaurants and bars around the venue.

Alamo Drafthouse Cinema

The cinema offers 7 auditoriums, foods and drinks services to each auditorium, and 4K digital projection. Attached to the cinema is a lounge area featuring cocktails and crafted beer. Additionally there is also an open-air patio.

In June 2024, the Alamo Drafthouse location closed, along with every other Dallas-area location. With an acquisition saving the regional locations, the Alamo Drafthouse at Toyota Music Factory is scheduled to reopen on August 23, 2024.

Texas Lottery Plaza

An Open-aired plaza that is surrounded by restaurants and bars and additional performance area for music. This area is available to rent to customers.

Stumpy's Hatchet House

An indoor hatchet throwing venue with 11 throwing pits. Additionally amenities are beer pong, cornhole, jukebox, and lounge areas with TV's. Toyota Music Factory is the first venue in the United States to include hatchet throwing indoors.
