= Buckner Terrace, Dallas =

Neighborhood in Texas, US

Coordinates: 32.791°N 96.699°W

Buckner Terrace is a neighborhood and 2,800 acre real estate development that included active construction from the 1960s to the 1980s located in East Dallas. Although the Buckner Terrace Homeowner's Association does not serve the portions of the subdivision north of Interstate 30, the subdivision is actually bisected by Interstate 30, with a significant portion of its homes located in the areas near the Claremont and White Rock Hills neighborhoods. The earliest developed portions of the neighborhood were north of Interstate 30 and some homes in Buckner Terrace north of Interstate 30 date from 1959-1962.

== History ==
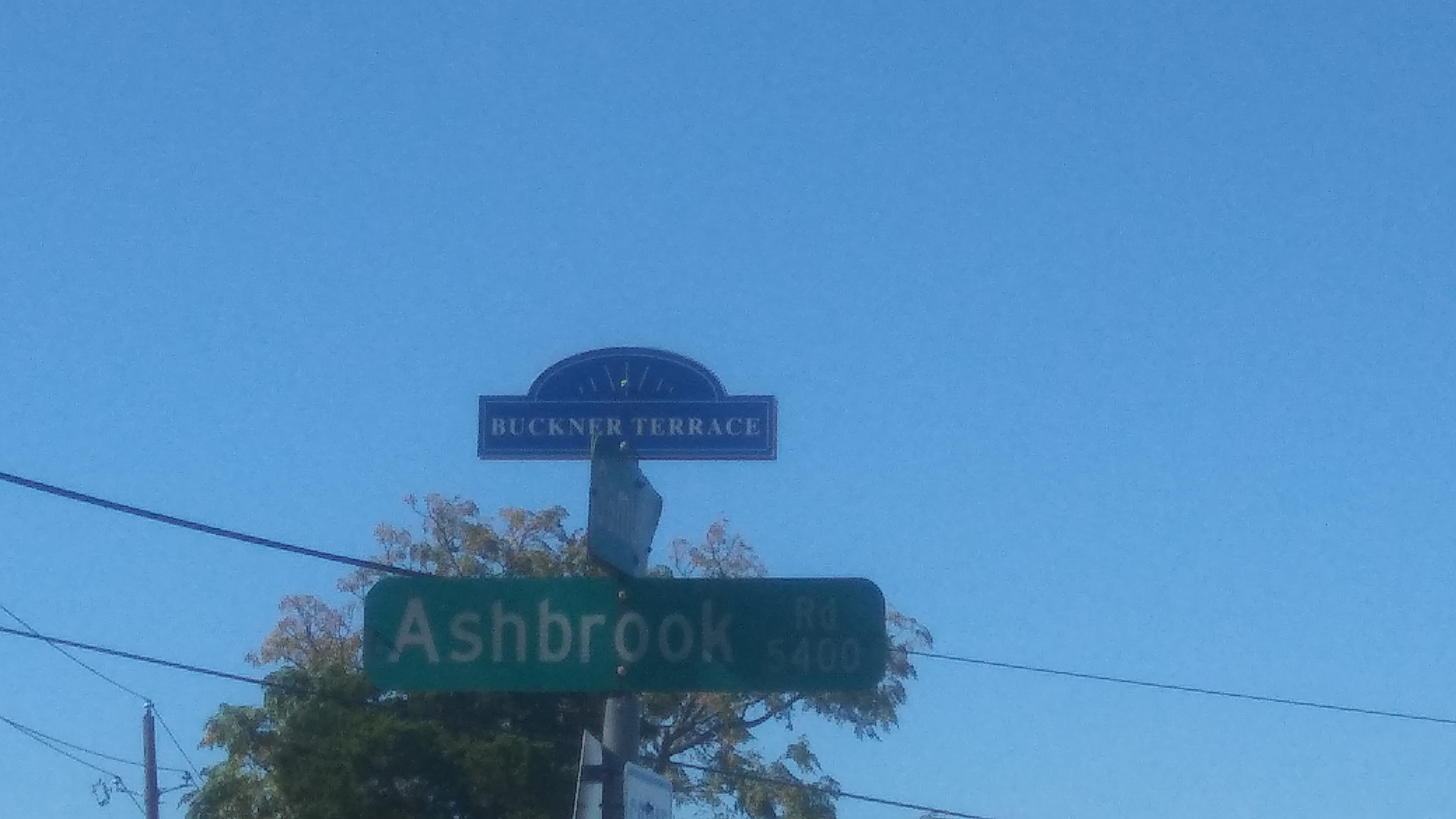
Street topper for the Buckner Terrace neighborhood

Development of Buckner Terrace north of Interstate 30 was undertaken in 1965. Approximately 2,400 acres of land was part of the development, and more than 1,200 lots had been fully developed by the summer of 1966. The development north of Interstate 30 was spearheaded by Buckner Park, Inc., and was headed by developer Wayne Claycomb. The mid-1960s-built homes in the neighborhood were advertised as being equipped for gas and featuring a gas light in front of each home. Wood-paneled dens, shag carpeting, and wood-burning fireplaces were advertised features of many homes during this period.

By 1968, more than a dozen builders were building in the community under the direction of developers Claycomb and Harry Gross. They included Jewel Fall, George Bohmer, Ray Williamson, Bill Feagin, Bob Sears, Carl Norris, J.R. Mullins, Walter Marusak, J.L. Parker, H.F. Feagin, Virgil Pembroke, David Potter, C.I. Zimmerman, H. Bond, P.N. Scudder, Leroy Jenkins, Bill Denny, Joe Edwards, Cleo Norris, and Bob McNutt.

By 1972, more than 2,000 homes had been constructed, a 250-acre planned commercial section for the neighborhood was under development, and a 450-acre industrial park adjacent to the neighborhood were under development.

By 1981, as the subdivision filled out its final installations, the home prices had reached $130,000. In 1972, roughly 2,000 square feet of new construction in the neighborhood sold for between $32,000 and $40,000.

== Characteristics ==
North of Interstate 30, Buckner Terrace is bounded by Hunnicut Road to the north and west, Saint Francis Avenue to the east, Woodhue Road to the west, and Interstate 30 to the south. South of Interstate 30, Buckner Terrace is bounded by Interstate 30 to the north, Forney Road to the south, Buckner Boulevard to the east, and Lawnview Avenue to the west.

Buckner Terrace is considered one of Dallas' most racially and ethnically mixed neighborhoods. Its neighborhood association is considered among the city's most politically powerful neighborhood associations.

Neighborhood Amenities include Skyline Branch - Dallas Public Library, Everglade Park and Everglade Park Pool.
