= Belt Line station =

DART rail station in Irving, Texas

Belt Line
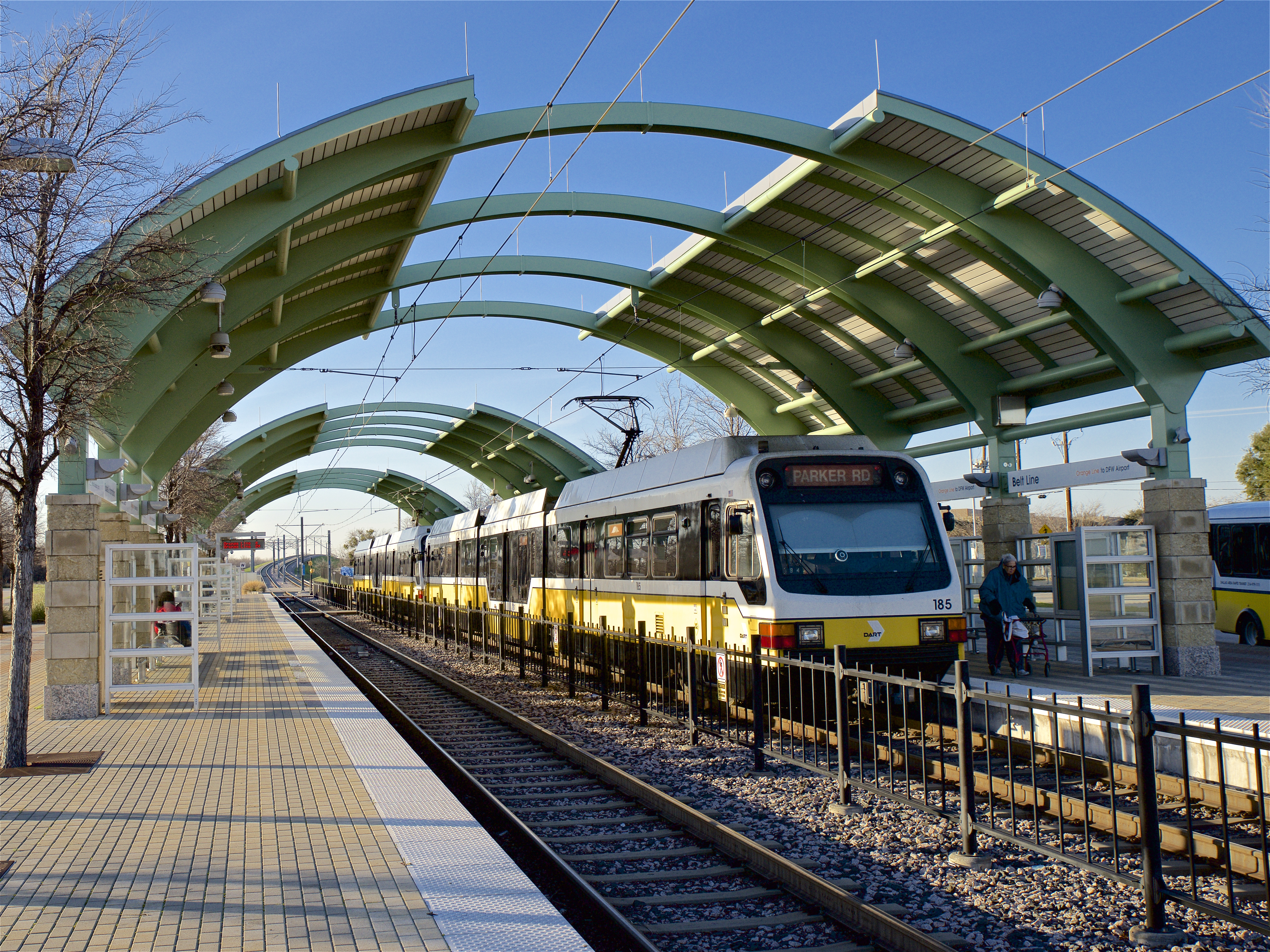

General information
- Location: 5800 Valley View Lane; Irving, Texas
- Coordinates: 32°53′15″N 96°59′14″W
- System: DART rail
- Owner: Dallas Area Rapid Transit
- Connections: DART: Cypress Waters GoLink Zone (M-Sun), Passport Park/Bear Creek GoLink Zone (M-Sun)

Construction
- Structure type: At-grade
- Parking: 597 spaces
- Accessible: Yes

History
- Opened: December 3, 2012

Services
| Preceding station | DART | Following station |
|---|---|---|
| DFW Airport Terminal A Terminus | Orange Line | Dallas College North Lake Campus toward LBJ/Central or Parker Road |
Location

Belt Line station is a DART rail station in Irving, Texas. The station is located on the property of Dallas Fort Worth International Airport near the intersection of Belt Line Road and President George Bush Turnpike.

The station serves the Orange Line. It is also a hub for Cypress Waters GoLink, an on-demand service in the nearby Cypress Waters development. Until the opening of DFW Airport station, it was the westernmost terminus of the Orange Line.

== History ==
Belt Line station was opened on December 3, 2012 as the western terminus of the Orange Line's first expansion. Bus route 500 was established to connect the station to DFW Airport.

At opening, Belt Line participated in DART's Fair Share Parking program, which charged a daily parking fee for patrons that did not live in DART member cities. The program also offered overnight parking at a cost of $7–9 per day, roughly equivalent to the daily fees charged by DFW Airport for remote parking. The program was retired on April 2, 2014.

On August 18, 2014, the Orange Line was expanded to DFW Airport station and route 500 was redirected to service Cypress Waters. On January 24, 2022, as part of a larger reorganization of DART's bus network, route 500 was replaced with GoLink, a microtransit service.
