= Orange Line (DART) =

Light rail line in the Dallas-Fort Worth Metroplex, Texas

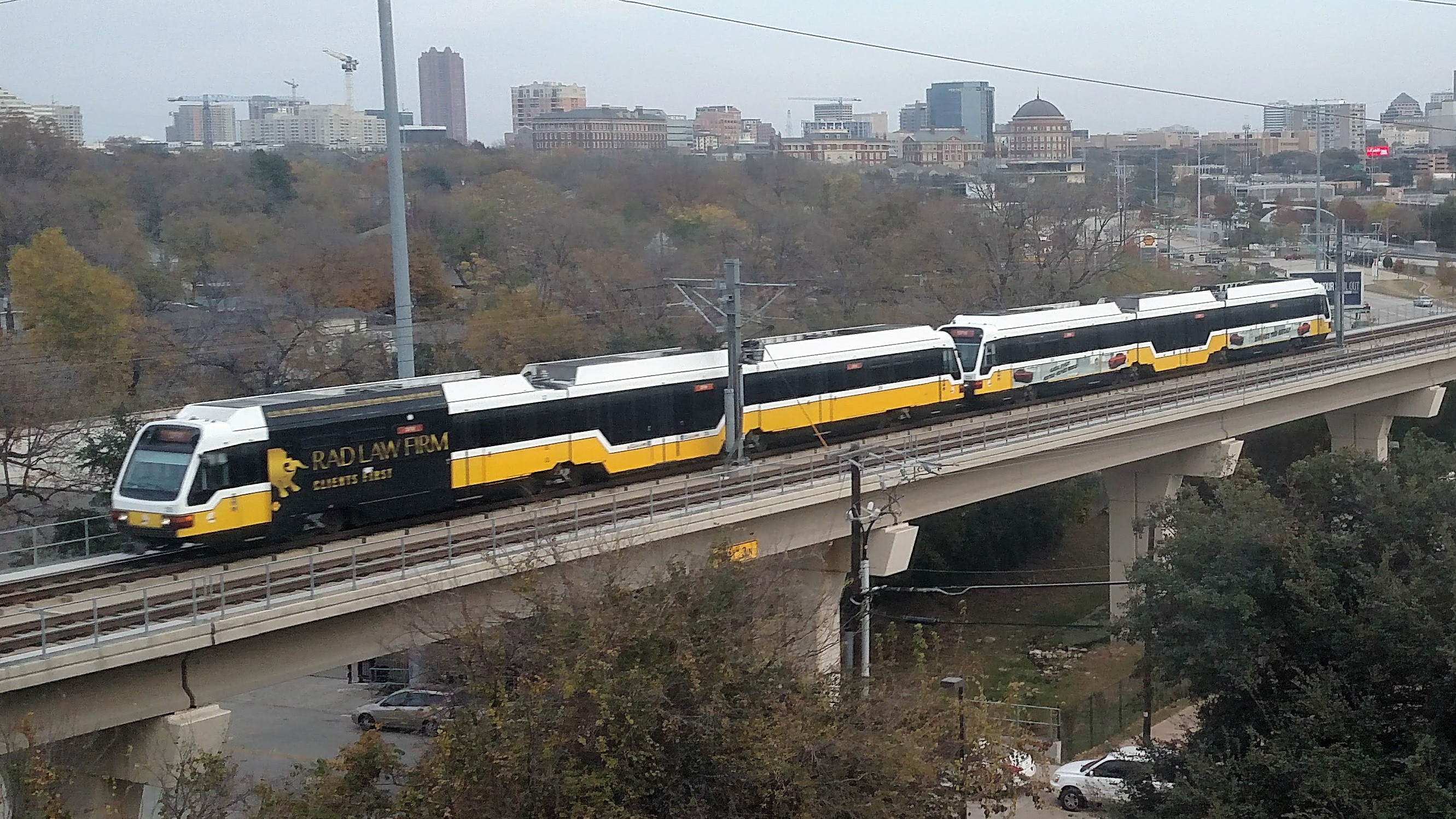
- DFW Airport bound Orange Line train crossing Lucas Drive

Overview
- Owner: Dallas Area Rapid Transit
- Termini: DFW Airport Terminal A (west); Parker Road (east, peak only) LBJ/Central (east, non-peak only)
- Stations: 31

Service
- Type: Light rail
- System: DART rail
- Operator(s): Dallas Area Rapid Transit
- Rolling stock: SLRV

History
- Opened: December 6, 2010
- Last extension: August 18, 2014

Technical
- Line length: 37 mi (59.5 km)
- Track gauge: 4 ft 8 1/2 in (1,435 mm) standard gauge
- Electrification: Overhead catenary, 750 V DC
Route map
Orange Line highlighted in orange

The Orange Line is a 37-mile (60 km) light rail line in the Dallas, Texas metropolitan area. The line is operated by Dallas Area Rapid Transit as a part of its DART rail system. The line runs from Dallas Fort Worth International Airport to northeastern Dallas, passing through Irving's Las Colinas neighborhood and Downtown Dallas in the interim. During weekday peak periods, the eastern segment of the line is extended further north to Richardson and Plano.

== Route ==
For publicity purposes, DART rail is divided into eight corridors, of which the Orange Line serves four.

On average, an end-to-end trip on the line will take 76 minutes (if the eastern terminus is LBJ/Central) or 92 minutes (if the eastern terminus is Parker Road).

=== Irving/DFW Corridor ===
The Irving/DFW Corridor, which has a length of 14 miles (23 km), is the only portion of the Orange Line that is not shared with other DART rail lines.

The line's western terminus is DFW Airport Terminal A, located inside Dallas Fort Worth International Airport. The line exits the airport through the north and proceeds southeast through Irving's Las Colinas neighborhood, passing Dallas College North Lake and the Irving Convention Center.

The line curves around Lake Carolyn before traveling south to John Carpenter Freeway (SH 114). Turning east, it parallels SH 114, passing the University of Dallas. At the former site of Texas Stadium, the line sharply redirects northeast, paralleling Storey Lane (Spur 482) and crossing the Elm Fork of the Trinity River. Upon reaching Northwest Highway (Loop 12), it curves southeast and merges with the Green Line, where it proceeds to Bachman station.

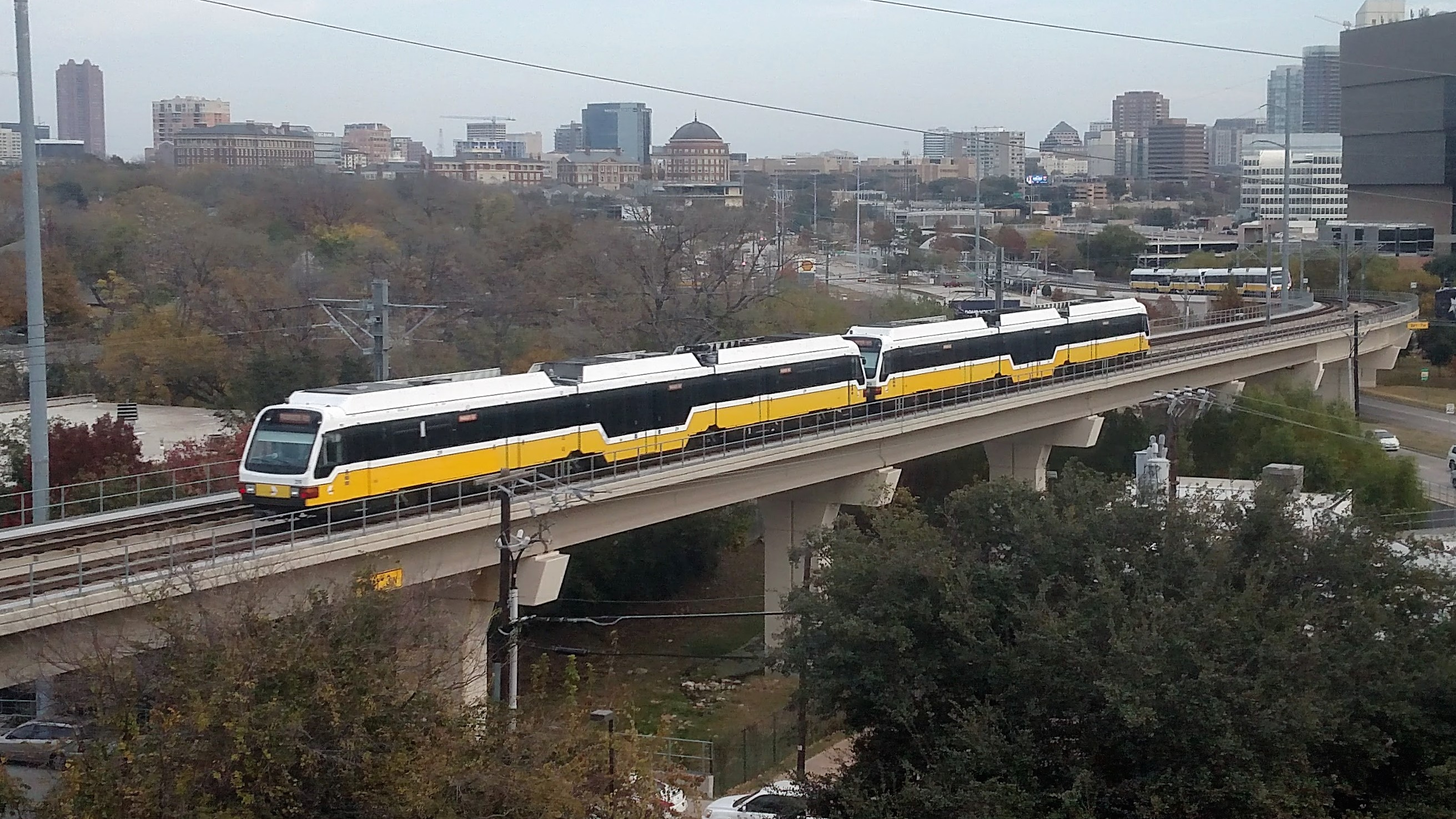
A Parker Road-bound Orange Train near Market Center

=== Northwest Corridor ===
Alongside the Green Line, the Orange Line travels southeast along Denton Drive, passing Dallas Love Field (which is serviced through a shuttle at Inwood/Love Field station). When Denton Drive ends, the lines continue south through the Southwestern Medical District to Harry Hines Boulevard. They briefly follow Harry Hines to Interstate 35E, where they turn to follows I-35E to Downtown Dallas.

=== Downtown Dallas Central Business District ===
Alongside the Green Line, the Orange Line enters Downtown Dallas at Victory Park. After stopping at American Airlines Center, the Orange Line turns east onto Pacific Avenue, which it shares with all other DART lines. It follows Pacific Avenue, and later Bryan Street, to the east side of downtown.

=== North Central Corridor ===
Along with the Red Line and Blue Line, the Orange Line turns north into a subway tunnel paralleling North Central Expressway (US 75). After passing the underground Cityplace/Uptown station, the subway tunnel ends at Mockingbird Lane. Above ground, the Orange Line and Red Line continue to parallel US 75 until the corridor's terminus at Parker Road station.

=== Other termini ===
During non-peak hours, the line terminates at LBJ/Central station, just south of Interstate 635. A pocket track north of I-635 is used to move trains from eastbound to westbound service.

When individual trains are entering or exiting service, special termini near DART's two rail yards are used. Trains entering or leaving the Northwest Rail Operating Facility terminate at Bachman station, which is directly south of the yard. Trains entering or leaving the Central Rail Operating Facility will divert from Pearl/Arts District to the southern Green Line, stopping at Deep Ellum and Baylor University Medical Center before terminating at Fair Park.

== History ==
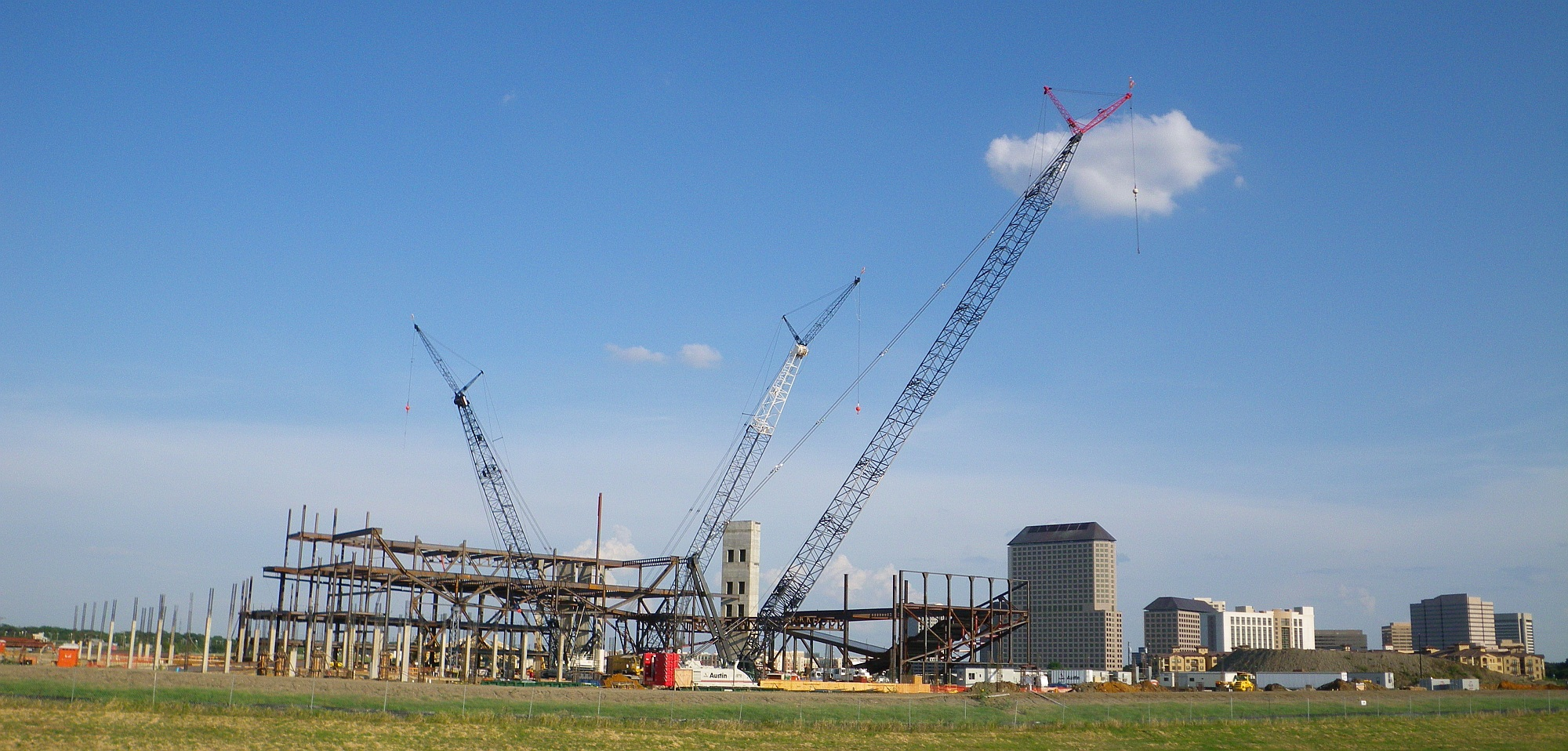
Construction of the Irving Convention Center near the Irving Convention Center Station

=== Planning and construction ===
Light rail transit in the Las Colinas area was first studied in 2000 as part of DART's Northwest Corridor study. The study proposed two lines, which evolved into the northern and western segments of the modern-day Green Line and Orange Line, respectively. In 2006, the two lines (with their current colors) were incorporated into DART's 2030 Transit System Plan, with revenue service to D/FW Airport expected in 2013.

While the original plan accepted by the Federal Transit Administration had the line travel west of Dallas Love Field, the City of Dallas wanted DART to consider realigning it to tunnel under the airport to facilitate a direct airport link. However, on March 12, 2007, officials from both parties agreed to make Love Field Station a surface-level facility, concluding a long debate over whether or not to make it an underground station closer to the airport. That ultimately led to the retention of the original FTA-approved plan.

On December 5, 2007, the Dallas Morning News ran a story reporting that DART President Gary Thomas said a previous cost estimate of $988 million was too low. The new cost estimate for the 14-mile project was $1.8 – $1.9 billion, he said. The $900 million overrun in costs caused considerable outrage among political leaders in Irving, Texas, the city the line runs through on its way to Dallas/Fort Worth International Airport. The Irving leaders conducted an inquiry into the cost overruns. Texas State Representative Linda Harper Brown sent an official letter to Mr. Thomas also inquiring about the project's cost overruns.

In February 2010, DART officials warned that the first two phases of the Orange Line might be delayed due to TXDOT problems along State Highway 114, which the Orange Line route follows. Utility relocation and road construction was expected to delay access to portions of the construction area where the rail line and highway intersect. DART estimated that the delay could push the opening of the Las Colinas extension from December 2011 to August 2012; however, DART also advised that it was determined to keep the original schedule and minimize any delays.

In June 2010, DART placed new Orange Line construction on indefinite hold due to declining revenue. However, on September 15, 2010, the agency said that due to cost savings and federal funds, the plans for the line have been revived.

On December 13, 2011, DART awarded a contract to design and build the Orange Line extension from Belt Line Road to DFW Airport, valued at about $150 million, with construction to start in early 2012 and an opening date of August 18, 2014, ahead of schedule.

=== Opening and operation ===
The Orange Line started operation on December 6, 2010, with weekday peak service from the Parker Road station to Bachman station on stations shared with DART's Red and Green lines. The first Orange Line-exclusive stations opened with the extension to Irving Convention Center on July 30, 2012, and two more were added on December 3, 2012. The current northwestern terminus, located at Dallas/Fort Worth International Airport, opened on August 18, 2014. Hidden Ridge Station, which was planned with the rest of the Orange Line but deferred until further development justified its construction, opened to revenue service on April 12, 2021.

=== Extension and rerouting proposals ===
When the extension to the airport was created, the western terminus of the proposed Cotton Belt Corridor (now the Silver Line) was DFW Airport North. To enable transfers to the airport, a secondary extension would add DFW Airport North to the Orange Line between DFW Airport Terminal A and Belt Line. However, by the time the Corridor was approved in 2018, expansions to SH-114 and SH-121 rendered this extension infeasible. Instead, the Silver Line was extended south to DFW Airport Terminal B by sharing tracks with TEXRail.

The D2 Subway project would reroute the line's Downtown Dallas segment into a new subway tunnel between Victory and Deep Ellum with four new underground stations. The project was originally set for completion in 2028 but is currently on hiatus.

== Stations ==
=== Daily service ===
Listed from Northeast to Northwest. Peak-hour only service is highlighted.

Station	Other lines	Opened	Notes
DFW Airport Terminal A		August 18, 2014	Terminus; transfer to TEXRail (at Terminal B)
Belt Line		December 3, 2012	
Dallas College North Lake Campus		December 3, 2012	
Hidden Ridge		April 12, 2021	
Irving Convention Center		July 30, 2012	
Las Colinas Urban Center		July 30, 2012	
University of Dallas		July 30, 2012	
Bachman	Green Line (DART)	December 6, 2010	Westernmost transfer for Green Line
Burbank	Green Line (DART)	December 6, 2010	
Inwood/Love Field	Green Line (DART)	December 6, 2010	
Southwestern Medical District/Parkland	Green Line (DART)	December 6, 2010	
Market Center	Green Line (DART)	December 6, 2010	
Victory	Green Line (DART)	November 13, 2004	Transfer to Trinity Railway Express
West End	Red Line (DART) Blue Line (DART) Green Line (DART)	June 14, 1996	Westernmost transfer station for Red and Blue lines
Akard	Red Line (DART) Blue Line (DART) Green Line (DART)	June 14, 1996	
St. Paul	Red Line (DART) Blue Line (DART) Green Line (DART)	June 14, 1996	Transfer to M-Line Trolley (one block north)
Pearl/Arts District	Red Line (DART) Blue Line (DART) Green Line (DART)	June 14, 1996	Easternmost transfer for Green Line
Cityplace/Uptown	Red Line (DART) Blue Line (DART)	December 18, 2000	Transfer to M-Line Trolley
SMU/Mockingbird	Red Line (DART) Blue Line (DART)	January 10, 1997	Northernmost transfer for Blue Line
Lovers Lane	Red Line (DART)	January 10, 1997	
Park Lane	Red Line (DART)	January 10, 1997	
Walnut Hill	Red Line (DART)	July 1, 2002	
Forest Lane	Red Line (DART)	July 1, 2002	
LBJ/Central	Red Line (DART)	July 1, 2002	Terminus for Orange Line outside peak hours
Spring Valley	Red Line (DART)	July 1, 2002	
Arapaho Center	Red Line (DART)	July 1, 2002	
Galatyn Park	Red Line (DART)	July 1, 2002	
CityLine/Bush	Red Line (DART) Silver Line (DART)	December 9, 2002	Formerly Bush Turnpike Station until March 14, 2016. Southern transfer for the Silver Line
12th Street	Red Line (DART) Silver Line (DART)	October 25, 2025	Northernmost transfer for the Silver Line
Downtown Plano	Red Line (DART)	December 9, 2002	
Parker Road	Red Line (DART)	December 9, 2002	Terminus for Red (full-time) and Orange lines (peak-hour)

=== Special event service ===
Listed from East to West

- Lawnview (Also served by the Green Line)
- Hatcher (Also served by the Green Line)
- MLK, Jr. (Also served by the Green Line)
- Fair Park (Also served by the Green Line)
- Baylor University Medical Center (Also served by the Green Line)
- Deep Ellum (Also served by the Green Line)

=== Deferred ===
The original Northwest Corridor plan included two stations which were deferred pending future development of their surrounding sites. To date, neither station has been constructed. While not listed as such in the original plan, Hidden Ridge station was also deferred until its opening in 2021.

Loop 12 station would be located at the intersection of Loop 12 and SH 114 near the former site of Texas Stadium. The city of Irving has established a redevelopment plan for the site which includes the station. Meanwhile, the DART FY2024-2028 Capital Improvement Plan hints at a possible opening in Fiscal Year 2028 (2028-2029).

South Las Colinas station would be located on Teleport Boulevard near SH 114 and a former BNSF rail corridor. It would serve as an intermodal transit center between DART rail, a proposed Las Colinas APT System extension, and a proposed commuter rail line on the BNSF corridor that would run from Irving to Frisco.
