= DFW Airport Terminal A station =

DART rail station at Dallas/Fort Worth International Airport

DFW Airport
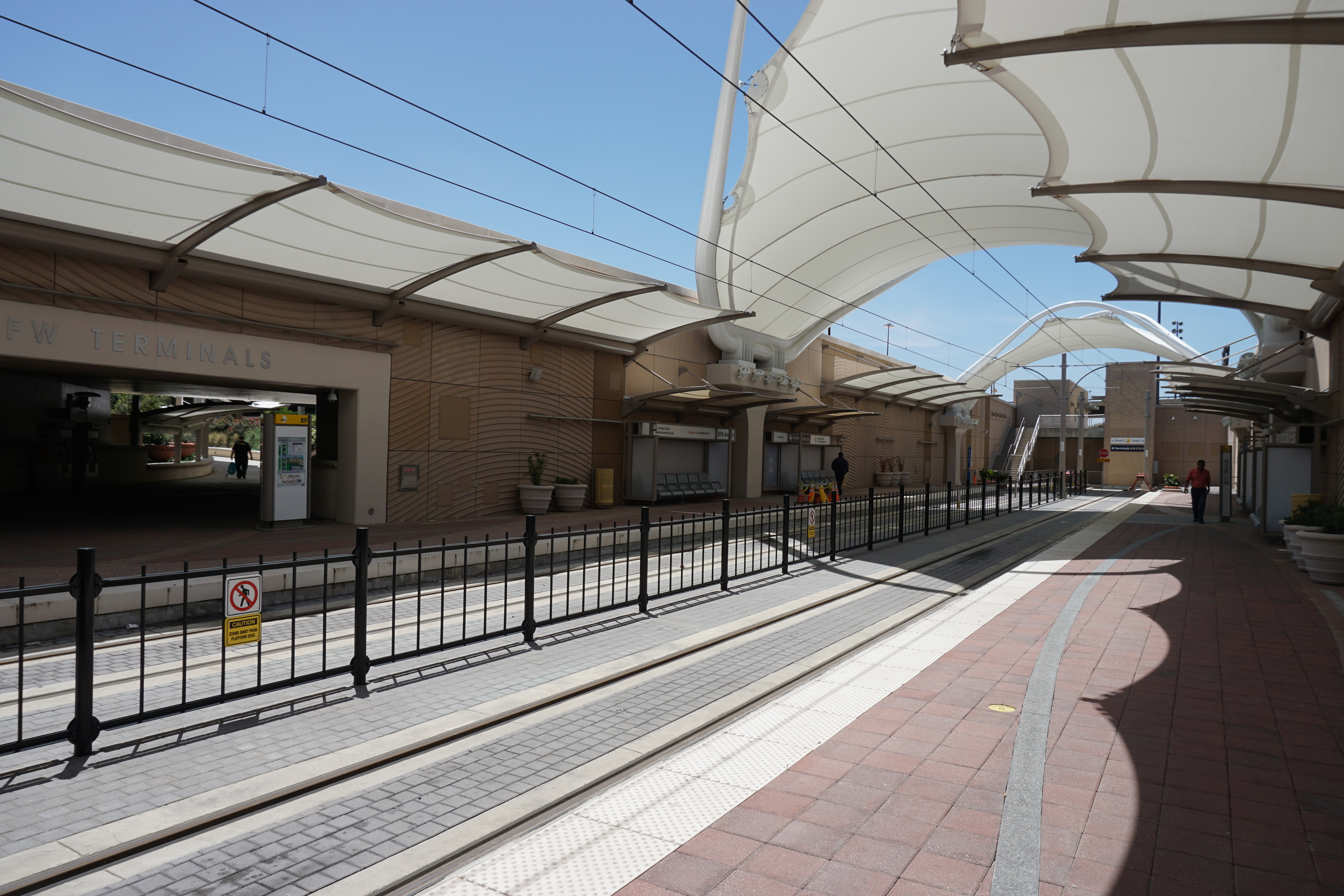
- Station platform with underpass to Terminal A on left

General information
- Location: 2049 North Service Road; DFW Airport, Texas
- Coordinates: 32°54′25″N 97°02′25″W
- System: DART rail
- Owner: Dallas Fort Worth International Airport
- Operator: Dallas Area Rapid Transit
- Platforms: 2 side platforms
- Tracks: 2
- Connections: Silver Line at Terminal B; TEXRail at Terminal B; Skylink (post-security); DFW Terminal Link; Trinity Metro: 31 (TRE Link) at Terminal B; FlixBus

Construction
- Structure type: At-grade
- Accessible: Yes

History
- Opened: August 18, 2014

Passengers
- FY 2025: 1,389 (avg. weekday) ▲5.5%

Services
Preceding station	DART	Following station
Terminus	Orange Line	Belt Line toward LBJ/Central or Parker Road
Location

DFW Airport Terminal A station (sometimes simply DFW Airport station) is a DART rail station at Dallas Fort Worth International Airport. The station is the western terminus of the Orange Line, which connects the airport to Las Colinas and Downtown Dallas.

Pedestrian walkways connect the station to the lower level of Terminal A and the DFW Airport Terminal B commuter rail station, which services TEXRail and a shuttle to the Trinity Railway Express station CentrePort/DFW Airport. The walkway between the Terminal A and Terminal B stations is also used as a FlixBus station.

Terminals C, D, and E can be accessed both landside (via DFW's Terminal Link shuttle) or airside (via the Skylink people mover) from Terminal A's upper level. Dallas's other major airport, Dallas Love Field, can be accessed by taking the Orange Line to Inwood/Love Field station; a trip between DFW Airport and Inwood/Love Field takes approximately 39 minutes.

== History ==
A rail connection to Dallas Fort Worth International Airport was a component of DART's initial rail plan, dating back to 1983. The proposed route entailed entering the airport from the north, as several developers offered to pay for part of the line if it passed through Las Colinas, a neighborhood of Irving. A similar proposal was made in 2002 by the municipal government of Irving.

While most plans for the DFW airport station were located between Terminals A and B, a 2009 study by the North Central Texas Council of Governments suggested an alternate location at the northern edge of the airport. The station would be located on a former Cotton Belt corridor that was planned to be used for commuter rail. Terminal access would be provided through an extension of the airport's Skylink people mover. This plan was rejected by the city of Irving, which desired a direct connection to the terminal.

Construction of the 5-mile (8.0 km), $397 million Orange Line segment from Belt Line to the airport began in 2011. $120 million of the segment's funding came from a federal TIFIA loan. DART constructed the rail lines into the new station, while DFW Airport designed and constructed the station itself. The station opened on August 18, 2014.
