= Las Colinas, Irving, Texas =

The Las Colinas Association
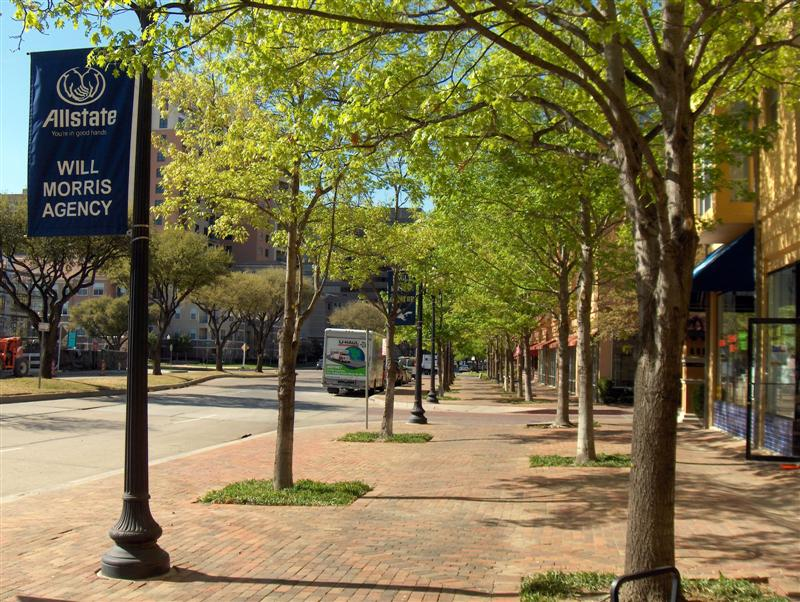
- Streetscape in the Las Colinas Urban Center

- Nickname: Las Colinas
- Location within Texas
- Coordinates: 32°53′30″N 96°56′54″W
- Country: United States
- State: Texas
- Counties: Dallas
- City: Irving

Area
  - Total: 9.4 sq mi (24.3 km^{2})
- Elevation: 479 ft (146 m)
- Website: lascolinas.org

Las Colinas is a mixed-use planned community development in Irving, Texas governed by The Las Colinas Association, a Texas nonprofit corporation. Due to its central location in the Dallas/Fort Worth Metroplex and proximity to Dallas/Fort Worth International Airport and Dallas Love Field airport, Las Colinas has been a focus of corporate and business relocation.

== History ==
Initially named Hackberry Creek Ranch, the land that gave rise to Las Colinas was first owned by businessman John W. Carpenter. His wife Flossie Gardner Carpenter renamed it El Ranchito de las Colinas ("the Little Ranch of the Hills"); his son, cattle ranching millionaire Ben H. Carpenter developed the former ranch in 1972. It was one of the first planned communities in the United States and was once the largest mixed-use development in the South, with a land area of more than 12,000 acres (49 km^{2}). Urban planners were consulted to lay out the entire town, an undertaking that predated later projects in Plano, Allen, and other Dallas suburbs.

During the 1980s building boom, Las Colinas became a popular location for relocating companies and office developers, attracting many corporations, including the global headquarters of four Fortune 500 companies and offices of more than 30 others, such as ExxonMobil, GTE Telephone (now Verizon), Kimberly-Clark and Associates Corp.

In 1985, the first sign of financial trouble appeared at Las Colinas after a real estate market crash. However, another 6,500,000 square feet (604,000 m^{2}) of office space was built in the late 1990s boom.

=== Recent ===
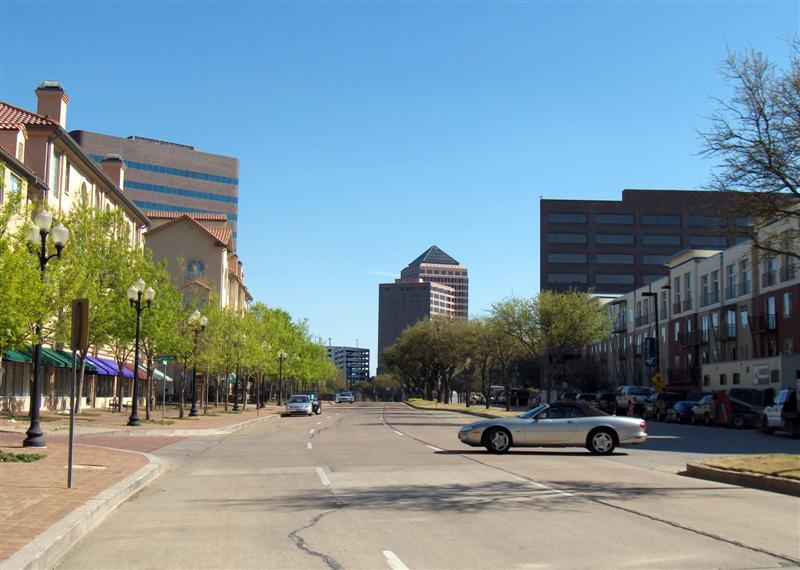
Las Colinas Blvd.

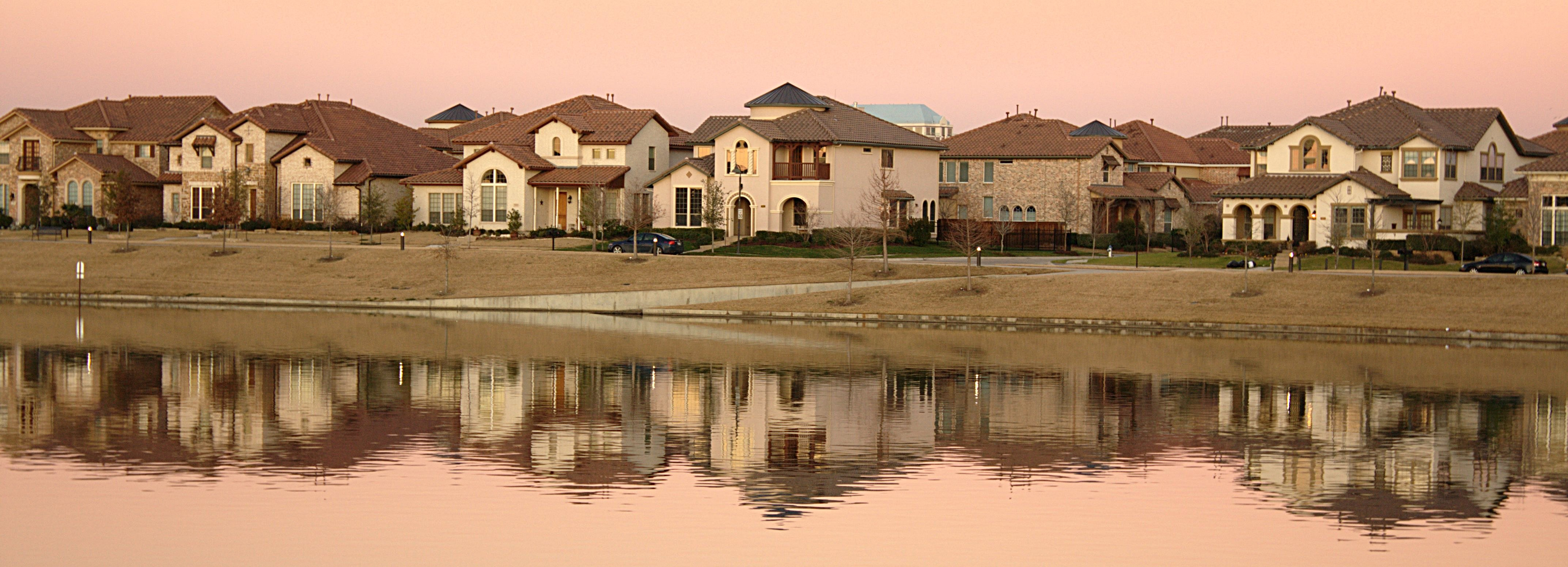
Houses on Camino Lago, Las Colinas

With 25,000,000 sq ft (2,300,000 m^{2}) of office space, nearly equivalent to the Dallas CBD, Las Colinas is home to more than 2,000 companies, including the Fortune 500 global headquarters for Caterpillar Inc., Commercial Metals, ExxonMobil, Fluor, Celanese and Kimberly-Clark. Other companies with headquarters in Las Colinas include Mission Foods, Trend Micro and La Quinta Inns and Suites. In 1999. La Quinta announced it would move its headquarters from San Antonio, stating it wanted to be near Dallas/Fort Worth International Airport. It is also the home to The Kidd Kraddick Morning Show and ESPN Dallas. FOX News also tapes from the FOX News Texas Studios in Las Colinas.

Other companies and organizations with headquarters or major offices in Las Colinas include Abbott Laboratories, Accenture, AAA-Texas, AT&T, BlackBerry, The Big 12 Conference and Conference USA Headquarters, TheBlaze, Boy Scouts of America, Citigroup, Cortland Partners, First Choice Power, Christus Health, Flowserve, General Motors Financial, Tenaska, Infor, Microsoft, NEC America, Nexstar Media Group, Nokia, Nokia Siemens Networks, Oracle, Paycom, PLH Group, PNM Resources, Inc., Stellar, TRT Holdings, Inc., Verizon, Vizient, Inc., Westwood One, and Zale Corporation. In 2008 TXU Energy moved offices into the former TM Advertising headquarters in Las Colinas.

Las Colinas also features three private country clubs, including the Las Colinas Country Club owned by ClubCorp, Hackberry Creek Country Club and four championship golf courses surrounded by gated communities. The TPC Four Seasons Las Colinas Resort has hosted the HP Byron Nelson Championship of PGA Tour since it opened in 1986. It features tree-lined fairways, large greens and a number of creeks and ponds. However, as the Four Seasons works to develop a high rise in Uptown, it will cease operations at the course, and the TPC will come under new hotel and course management by the end of 2022.

It also contains high-rise office towers, retail centers, upscale residences, apartment complexes, and leisure facilities. Notable attractions include the Mustangs at Las Colinas sculpture and fountain and Las Colinas Flower Clock. The Mustangs of Las Colinas are featured in the courtyard of the Towers at Williams Square, where another ClubCorp Property, La Cima Club, is located. The complex also features a River Walk-styled canal offering gondola cruises, as well as the above-ground Las Colinas APT System. Las Colinas has over 22,300,000 square feet (2,072,000 m^{2}) of office space, 1,300,000 square feet (121,000 m^{2}) of retail, and 3,400 single-family homes. A 40-acre (160,000 m^{2}) tract in Las Colinas is also home to the Irving Convention Center at Las Colinas.

Glenn Beck's independent news and entertainment television network, TheBlaze, has its largest studio complex based in Las Colinas.

The live music venue, originally known as the Irving Music Factory, was renamed the Toyota Music Factory and opened in September 2017. Additionally, the Live Nation concert venue, The Pavilion, was renamed The Pavilion at Toyota Music Factory, and the VIP Lounge was renamed the Toyota Lounge. The grounds of the Toyota Music Factory feature in total approximately 16 restaurants and bars.

In January 2022, ExxonMobil stated that it was consolidating and restructuring certain elements of its business, the most prominent being the consolidation of its chemical and refinery sectors. ExxonMobil additionally formalized the creation of a new low-carbon sector, which will handle the company's biofuel and carbon capture ventures. Concurrently, the company announced it would be closing its headquarters in Las Colinas, and moving to its recently opened campus in the Houston suburb of Spring. The company released its 2021 Q4 Earnings early the next day on February 1, recording a 3-month profit of $8.9 Billion USD, jumping over 80%. ExxonMobil that day additionally announced that both its total debt was now around pre-pandemic levels, and it would begin buying back some of its shares.

== Geography ==
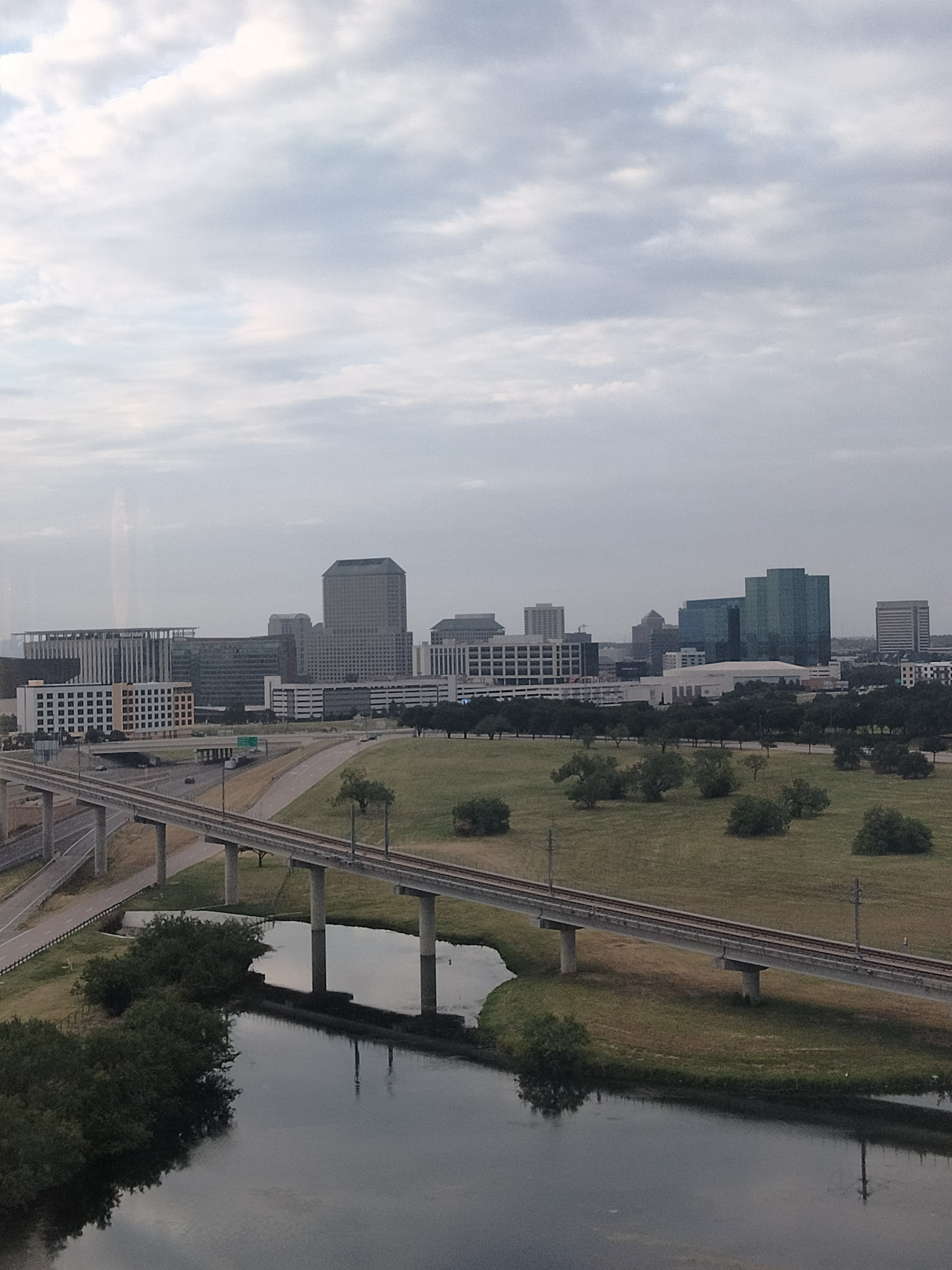
Skyline of Las Colinas

=== Climate ===
Las Colinas, as part of Irving and the greater DFW metroplex, is considered to be part of the humid subtropical (cfa) classification according to the Köppen system of climate classification. This means that the summers are very warm and humid with mild winters and variable rainfall year round.

=== Neighborhoods ===
- Avalon Square
- Bridges at Las Colinas
- Parkside
- Cottonwood Valley
- Crest at Las Colinas Station
- Country Club Place
- Enclave at Windsor Ridge
- Estates of Escena
- Fairway Vista
- Fox Glen
- Grand Treviso
- Hackberry Creek
- Hunter's Ridge
- La Villita
- The Lakes of Las Colinas
- Mandalay Place
- Positano
- Quail Run
- Riverside Village
- The Terraces of Las Colinas
- University Hills
- Villas of Escena

== Arts and culture ==
- Toyota Music Factory
- Irving Convention Center at Las Colinas

== Parks ==
- Las Colinas Flower Clock
- Lake Carolyn
- Mandalay Canal
- Mustangs of Las Colinas

== Government ==
The constituent properties of Las Colinas are governed by The Las Colinas Association, a State of Texas non-profit corporation first incorporated on 21 August 1973 by charter 329790. The Las Colinas Association is governed by non-compensated, volunteer board members, with equal representation for residential and commercial properties, and one Declarant representative.

== Education ==
Some portions of Las Colinas are within the Carrollton-Farmers Branch Independent School District. Some residents are zoned to Las Colinas Elementary School. Another portion is zoned to La Villita Elementary School.

Some portions are within the Irving Independent School District.

The Highlands School is a private Catholic pre-K through grade 12 college prep school in Las Colinas.

C-FBISD has always served a portion of Irving, and historically children were bussed to schools in Carrollton and Farmers Branch. Las Colinas, which opened in 1986, was C-FBISD's first school in Irving. The Kinwest Corporation donated the tract of land that houses the school. La Villita was C-FBISD's sixth school in Irving and its 27th elementary school.

North Hills Preparatory, an Uplift Education charter school is in Las Colinas. Uplift North Hills Preparatory is a K–12 continuum International Baccalaureate school and has been ranked as a top 20 school in America by Newsweek.

== Infrastructure ==
=== Transportation ===
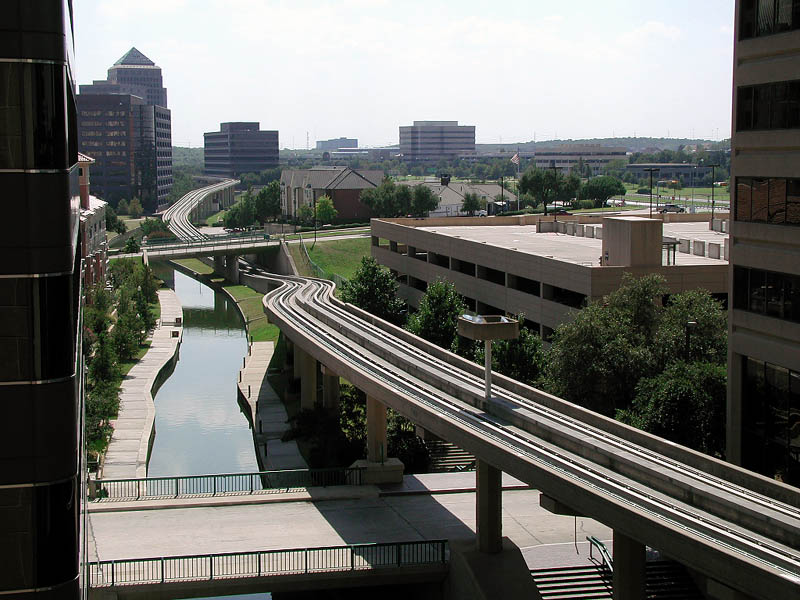
Las Colinas APT System

Irving is within the 13 service areas of the Dallas region's transit agency, Dallas Area Rapid Transit (DART). Irving is served by numerous bus routes and the North Irving Transit Center serves Las Colinas with express bus service to downtown Dallas. In July 2012, DART initiated Orange Line service to the Las Colinas Urban Center Station and Irving Convention Center Station. On December 3, 2012, North Lake College Station and Belt Line Station opened. The final segment of the Orange line was scheduled to open on December 15, 2014, but the date was changed to August 18, 2014, providing Dallas direct rail service to Dallas/Fort Worth International Airport via Las Colinas.

Like the rest of Dallas-Fort Worth however, the majority of traffic comes via the automobile. Interstate 635 forms the northern border of Las Colinas while Texas State Highway 114 cuts through its heart. A portion of the President George Bush Turnpike (Texas State Highway 161) cuts through the western side while the southern portion of Las Colinas can be accessed from Texas State Highway 183 via feeder roads such as MacArthur Boulevard, Belt Line Road and O’Connor Road.
