= LBJ/Central station =

DART rail station in Dallas, Texas

LBJ/Central
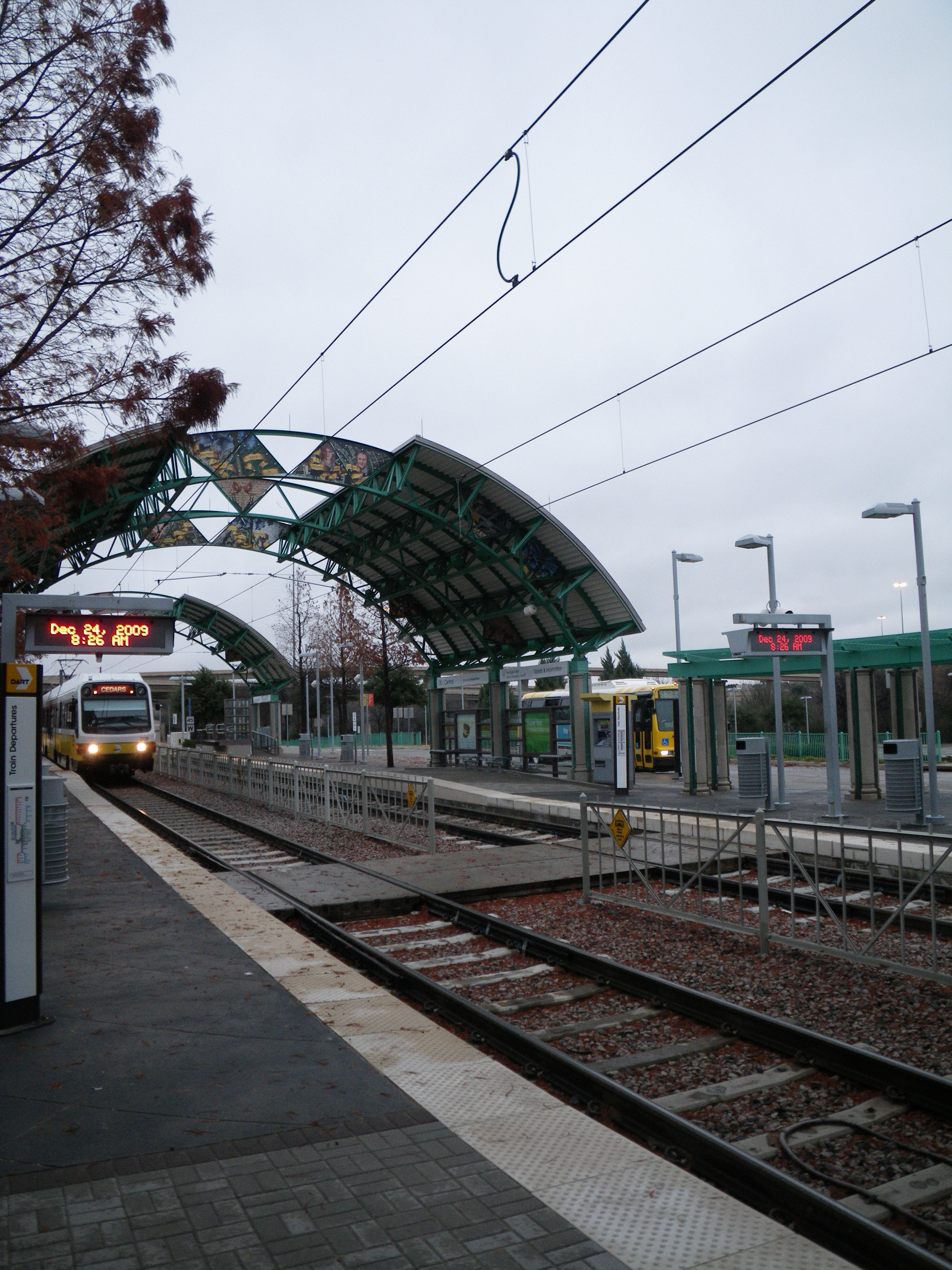

General information
- Location: 8901 Markville Drive; Dallas, Texas
- Coordinates: 32°55′6″N 96°45′7″W
- System: DART rail
- Owner: Dallas Area Rapid Transit
- Platforms: 2 side platforms
- Tracks: 2
- Connections: DART: 17, 413-TI Forest Lane Shuttle (weekdays), 417-TI North Shuttle (weekdays), 419-TI South Shuttle (weekdays), North Central Dallas GoLink Zone (M-Sun), North Dallas GoLink Zone (M-Sun), Preston Hollow GoLink Zone (M-Sun)

Construction
- Structure type: At-grade
- Parking: 553 spaces
- Cycle facilities: 2 lockers, 1 rack
- Accessible: Yes

History
- Opened: July 1, 2002

Passengers
- FY 2025: 1,145 (avg. weekday) ▲6.4%

Services
Preceding station	DART	Following station
Forest Lane toward Westmoreland	Red Line	Spring Valley toward Parker Road
Forest Lane toward DFW Airport Terminal A	Orange Line (peak-hour only)	Spring Valley toward Parker Road
Forest Lane toward DFW Airport Terminal A	Orange Line	Terminus
Location

LBJ/Central station is a DART rail station in Dallas, Texas that serves the Red Line and Orange Line. During non-peak hours (mornings, evenings, and weekends), it serves as the eastern terminus of the Orange Line.

The station is named for the intersection of Lyndon B. Johnson Freeway (I-635) and North Central Expressway (US 75), which it is adjacent to. The station services the two Dallas campuses of Texas Instruments through employee shuttles. It also services Dallas College Richland Campus through a bus route.

== History ==
Plans for a station servicing Texas Instruments date back to DART's 1983 rail plan. The plan called for the station to be the northern terminus of a starter corridor along North Central Expressway.

Detailed plans for the station were completed in 1997. The plan included a large park-and-ride lot intended for use by commuters on LBJ Freeway, particularly those using LBJ's high-occupancy vehicle lanes, which DART operated at the time.

The station was built atop two baseball fields, which were donated to DART by Texas Instruments. As part of the construction, DART expanded Markville Drive (on the southern side of the station) to meet Floyd Road (now TI Boulevard).

In tribute to Texas Instruments, the station's façade was decorated with circuit boards. The station's canopy was decorated with translucent panels honoring local organizations and individuals, including TI's Jack Kilby. The station was opened on July 1, 2002 as part of the Red Line's third expansion, which expanded the line from Park Lane to Galatyn Park.
