= Parker Road station =

Intermodal transit facility in Plano, Texas

Parker Road
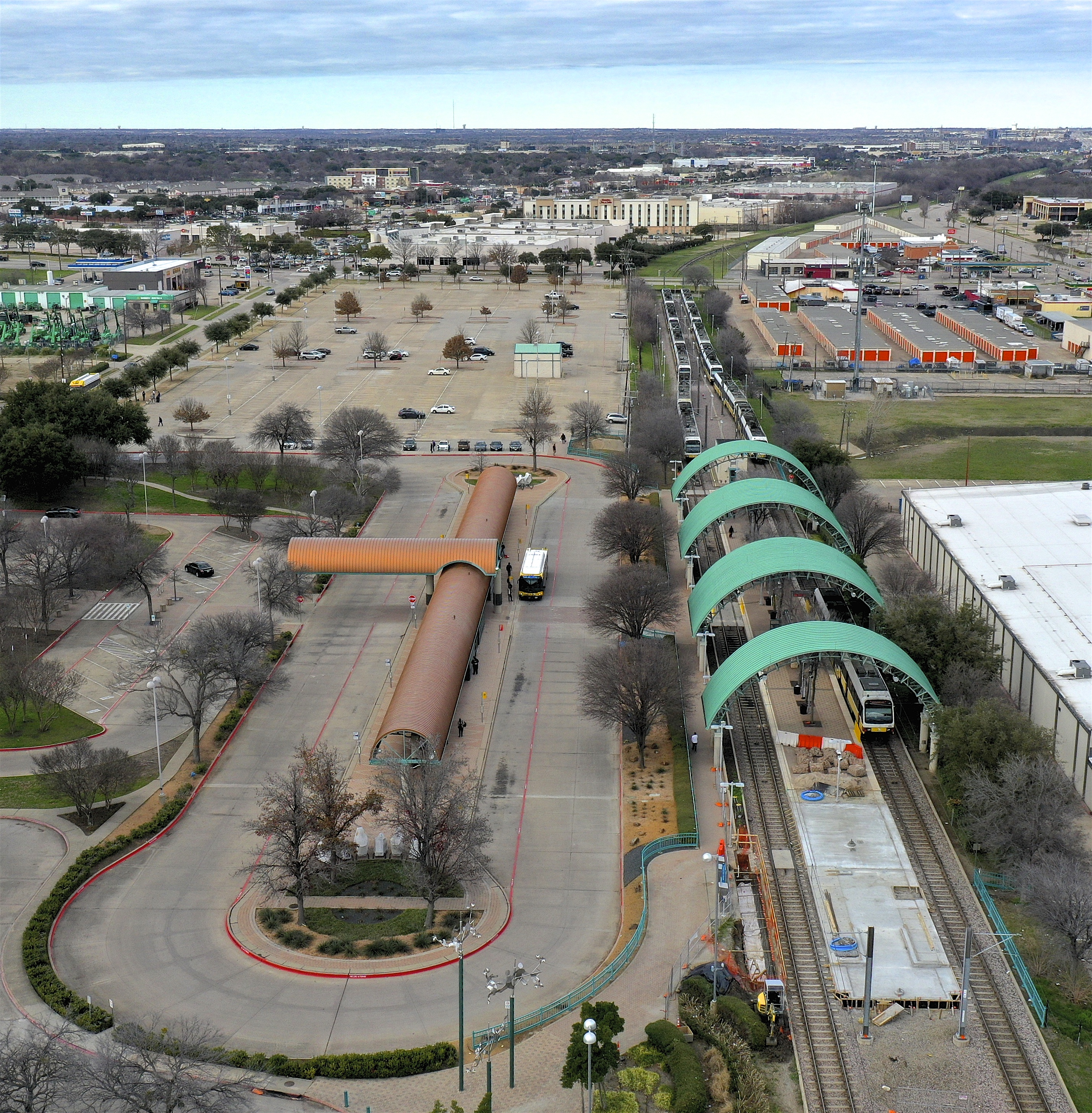
- Parker Road station. Bus transfer center on the left; rail platforms on the right.

General information
- Location: 2600 Archerwood Street, Plano, Texas 75074; Plano, Texas
- Coordinates: 33°2′2″N 96°42′3″W
- System: DART rail
- Owner: Dallas Area Rapid Transit
- Platforms: 1 island platform
- Connections: DART: 234, 236, 247; East Plano GoLink Zone (M-Sun), Far North Plano GoLink Zone (M-Sun), Legacy West GoLink Zone (M-Sun), North Central Plano/Chase Oaks GoLink Zone (M-Sun), South Central Plano GoLink Zone (M-Sun)

Construction
- Parking: 2,020 spaces (some reserved)
- Accessible: Yes

History
- Opened: April 20, 1993 (bus); December 9, 2002 (rail)

Passengers
- FY 2025: 2,223 (avg. weekday) ▲10.2%

Services
Preceding station	DART	Following station
Downtown Plano toward Westmoreland	Red Line	Terminus
Downtown Plano toward DFW Airport Terminal A	Orange Line (peak-hour only)	Terminus
Location

Parker Road station (formerly East Plano Transit Center) is an intermodal transit facility in Plano, Texas. The station is located near North Central Expressway (US 75) between Parker Road and Park Boulevard. Operated by Dallas Area Rapid Transit, the station services DART rail, three bus routes, and five on-demand service zones.

The station is the northern terminus of the Red Line. It is also the northern terminus of the Orange Line during weekday peak hours.

As of the 2025 fiscal year, the station has the highest weekday ridership of all DART rail stations outside of Downtown Dallas, with an average of 2,223 riders on weekdays.

== History ==
=== Plano Transit Center ===
The first DART facility in Plano was the Plano Transit Center, a small park-and-ride lot located at a former drive-in theater. The facility was very rudimentary, lacking passenger shelters or benches.

In early 1989, DART opened the West Plano Transit Center four miles west of Plano Transit Center. When this did not substantially decrease ridership at the lot, DART opted to build an expanded east Plano facility.

=== East Plano Transit Center ===
In 1990, DART purchased 19.2 acres of land for the new East Plano Transit Center. The land was adjacent to a disused Southern Pacific rail corridor that DART was studying for a then-proposed light rail system. The transit center, built at a $7.5 million cost, opened on April 20, 1993.

=== Parker Road ===
On December 7, 2002, to celebrate the coming train service, DART and the city of Plano offered free preview rides from Bush Turnpike to East Plano Transit Center. The event also celebrated the 100th anniversary of the Texas Electric Railway, which operated on the same right-of-way from 1902 to 1948.

The Red Line was officially extended to East Plano Transit Center on December 9, 2002 as part of the line's fourth and final extension. Following the extension, the station was renamed to Parker Road.

==== Fair Share Parking ====
On April 2, 2012, DART began a pilot program known as "Fair Share Parking". The program, operated by a private contractor, required commuters from non-DART member cities to pay a daily fee for parking at the station. Residents of DART member cities could park for free as long as they applied for and displayed a special resident permit. Parker Road was one of two stations to be included in the program at launch, the other being North Carrollton/Frankford. The program was intended to improve parking availability and to make up for the lack of sales tax revenue from non-residents. However, most commuters at Parker Road simply switched to parking at Bush Turnpike station, which regularly approached capacity in the months following the change.

After the initiative failed to make a profit, DART opted to end it on April 2, 2014 when its contract with the private operator expired. While most stations simply dropped the initiative altogether, Parker Road continued to utilize the resident permits by reserving lots at the station for permit holders.
