= Plano station =

Plano station may refer to different rail stations in the United States.

- Plano station (Illinois), serving Plano, Illinois
- Downtown Plano station of the Dallas Area Rapid Transit, serving Plano, Texas
- Plano Station, Texas Electric Railway, a historic rail depot served by the Texas Electric Railway
- Parker Road station, the terminus of the Dallas Area Rapid Transit line in Plano, Texas
