= Allen Depot (Allen, Texas) =

Train Depot

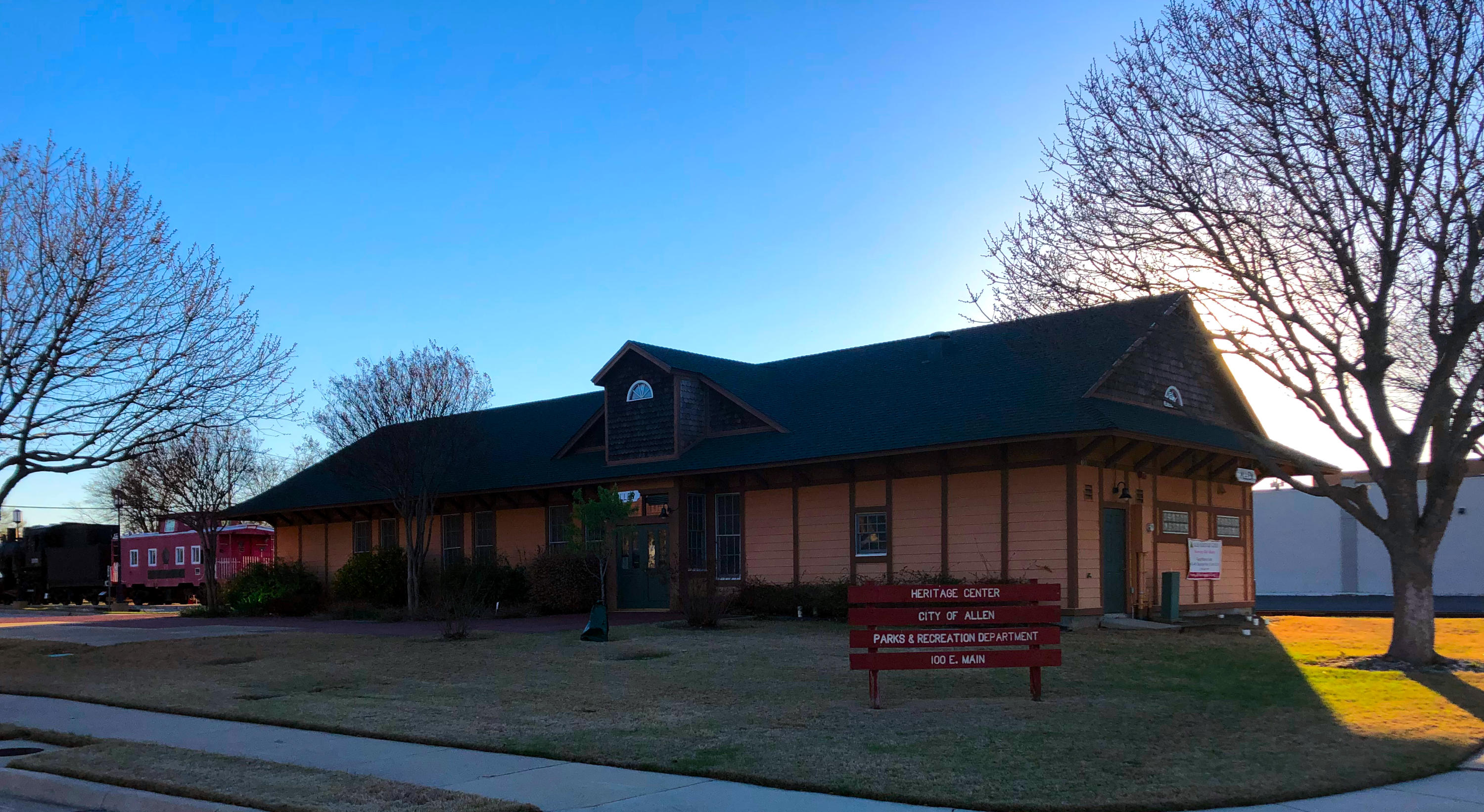

General information
- Other names: Allen Heritage Center
- Location: 100 East Main Street; Allen, Texas; United States
- Coordinates: 33°06′09.42″N 96°40′10.59″W
- Owner: Houston and Texas Central Railway
- Tracks: 1

Construction
- Structure type: at-grade
- Architectural style: American Foursquare

Other information
- Website: Allen Depot - AllenHeritage.org

History
- Opened: 1 January 1876
- Closed: 1 January 1959
Location

Allen Depot was established in 1876 in the central ward of Allen, Texas. The train depot served as a water stop for the Galveston and Red River Railway chartered by Ebenezer Allen in 1848. By 1856, the Southeast Texas to Red River railroad would transition to the Houston and Texas Central Railway.

By 1872, the Allen township began to acknowledge the progression of the track rail with the completion of the railway to Red River City, Texas by 1873.

By the 1950s, the Allen Depot began to observe a significant regression in steam locomotive railway traffic due to the progression of the American automobile industry in the 1950s and the United States interstate highway system.

== Allen Water Station ==
In 1874, the Houston and Texas Central Railway purchased a sector of land from Collin County resident J.W. Franklin to construct a water station to meet the water source demand as required by steam locomotives.

The Allen Water Station was recognized as a Texas historic site receiving a historical marker in 2015.

== History ==
The Old West outlaw Sam Bass and the Black Hill Bandits organized the first successful train robbery in the State of Texas within the vicinity of the Allen Depot on February 22, 1878.

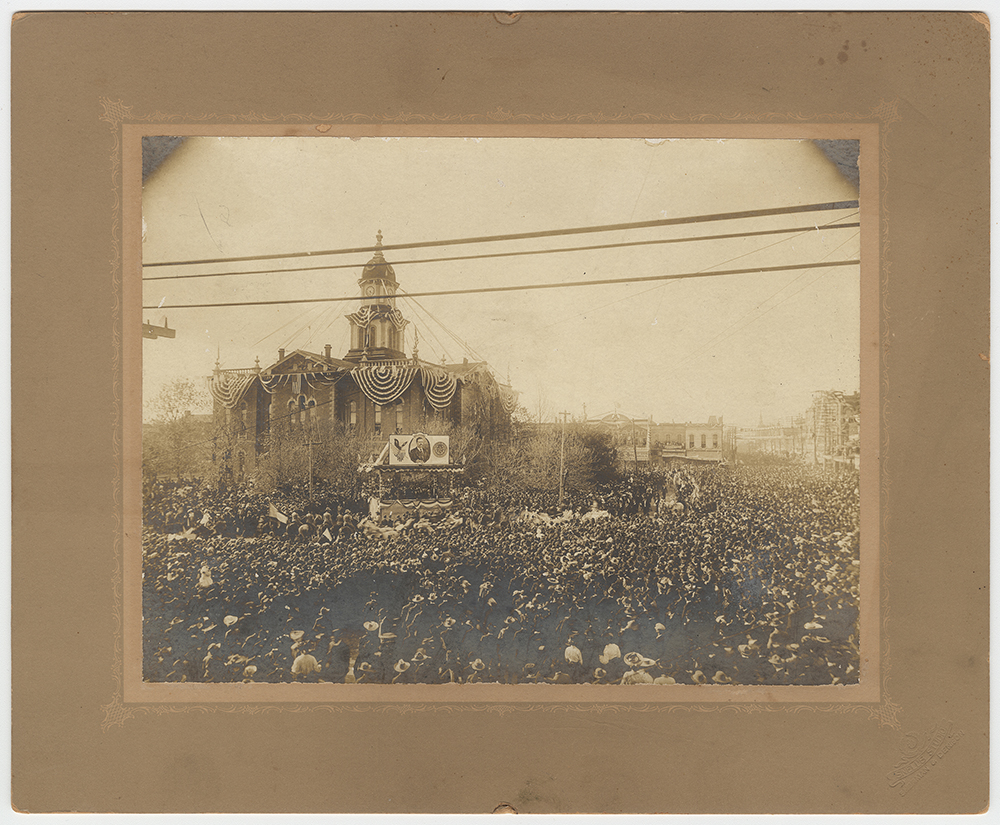
President Theodore Roosevelt delivering a speech in Sherman, Texas during April 1905

On April 5, 1905, President Theodore Roosevelt visited the Allen Train Depot while enroute to San Antonio, Texas for a Rough Riders reunion at the Menger Hotel.

The 26th President of the United States was cordially received by a vast jubilation who traveled one hundred miles or more by buckboard, buggy, and horseback across North Texas as President Roosevelt delivered speeches concerning his domestic Square Deal program.

In remembrance of President Theodore Roosevelt's 1905 appearances in Denison, Texas and Sherman, Texas, the Texas Historical Commission established a State of Texas historical marker in 1971 in Grayson County, Texas serving as a neighbor to the north of Collin County, Texas.

== Epidemic of 1860s and Texas railways ==
In 1860s, the southern Texas counties confronted the predatorial Aedes aegypti or an arthropod ultimately arriving through trade ports along the Texas Gulf Coast. The tropical infectious mosquito served as an asymptomatic carrier of an arbovirus progressively inflicting the symptoms of yellow fever on the South Texas civil parishes.

During the Gilded Age, the Texas railways established mounted regiments of health officers drawn on horseback to conduct quarantines of steam locomotives transporting rail travelers. The passenger railroad cars or Pullman coaches could potentially be hazardous providing conditions for a pathogen transmission of the mosquito-borne disease scientifically known as a flavivirus.

== Orphan Train movement of 1854-1929 ==
By the early 1850s, the U.S. states began to acknowledge over-crowding in the Eastern Seaboard cities. The Eastern United States instituted the guardianship of an Orphan Train movement for youth dependants determined as abandoned, homeless, orphaned, and street children in an American census-designated place. The American youth were missioned by the ideology of manifest destiny to an agrarian society in the American frontier.

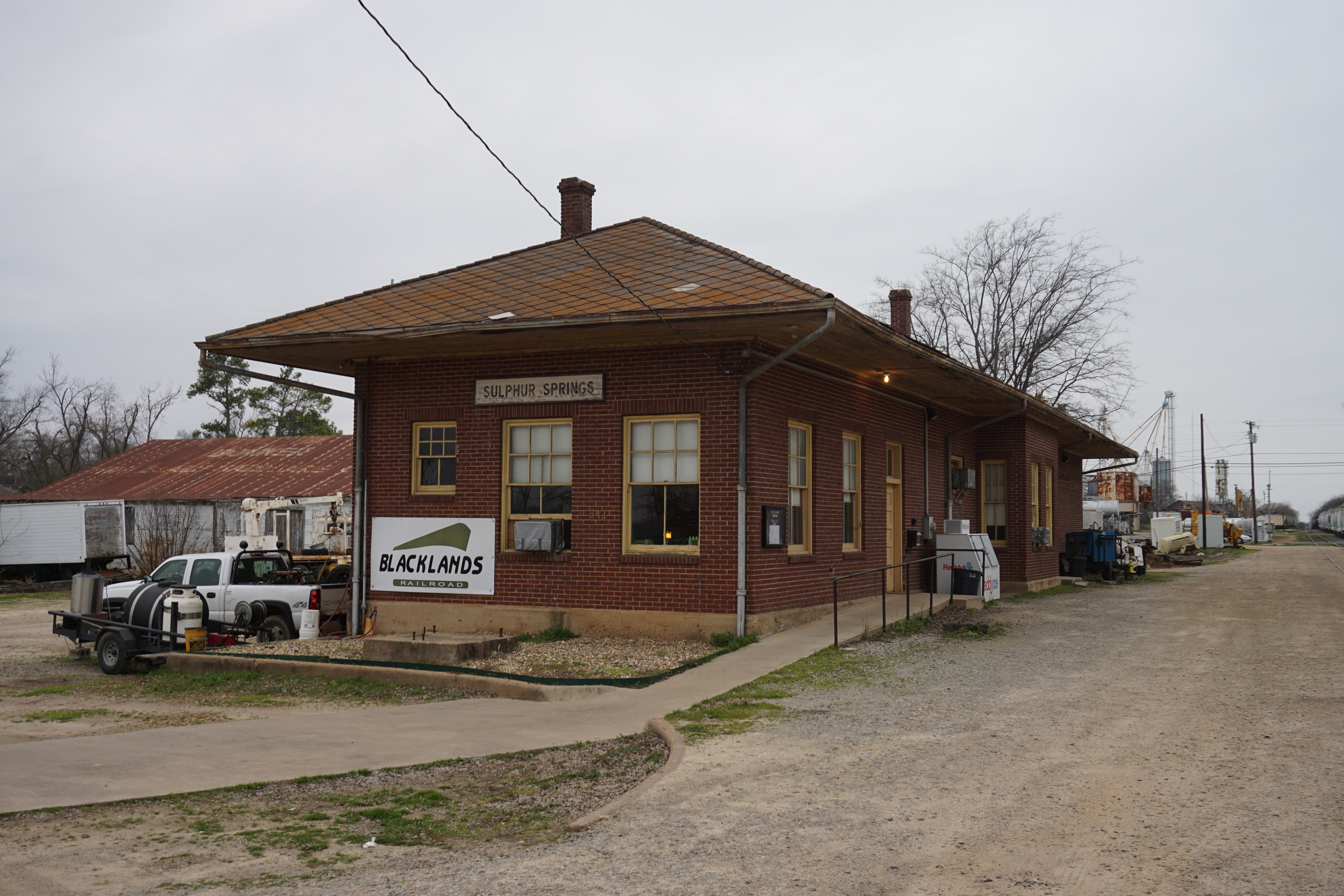
Sulphur Springs, Texas Depot

The social welfare initiative sustained seventy-five years enduring from 1854 to 1929 in the United States. On May 31, 1929, an orphan train departed New York City for a final steam locomotive journey with a terminative destination at Sulphur Springs, Texas.

Orphanage guilds in Texas included:

- Edna Gladney
- Evandberg Orphanage
- Galveston Orphans Home
- Masonic Home and School of Texas
- St. Mary's Orphan Asylum

== Gallery ==
Allen Rail Depot in Allen, Collin County, Texas
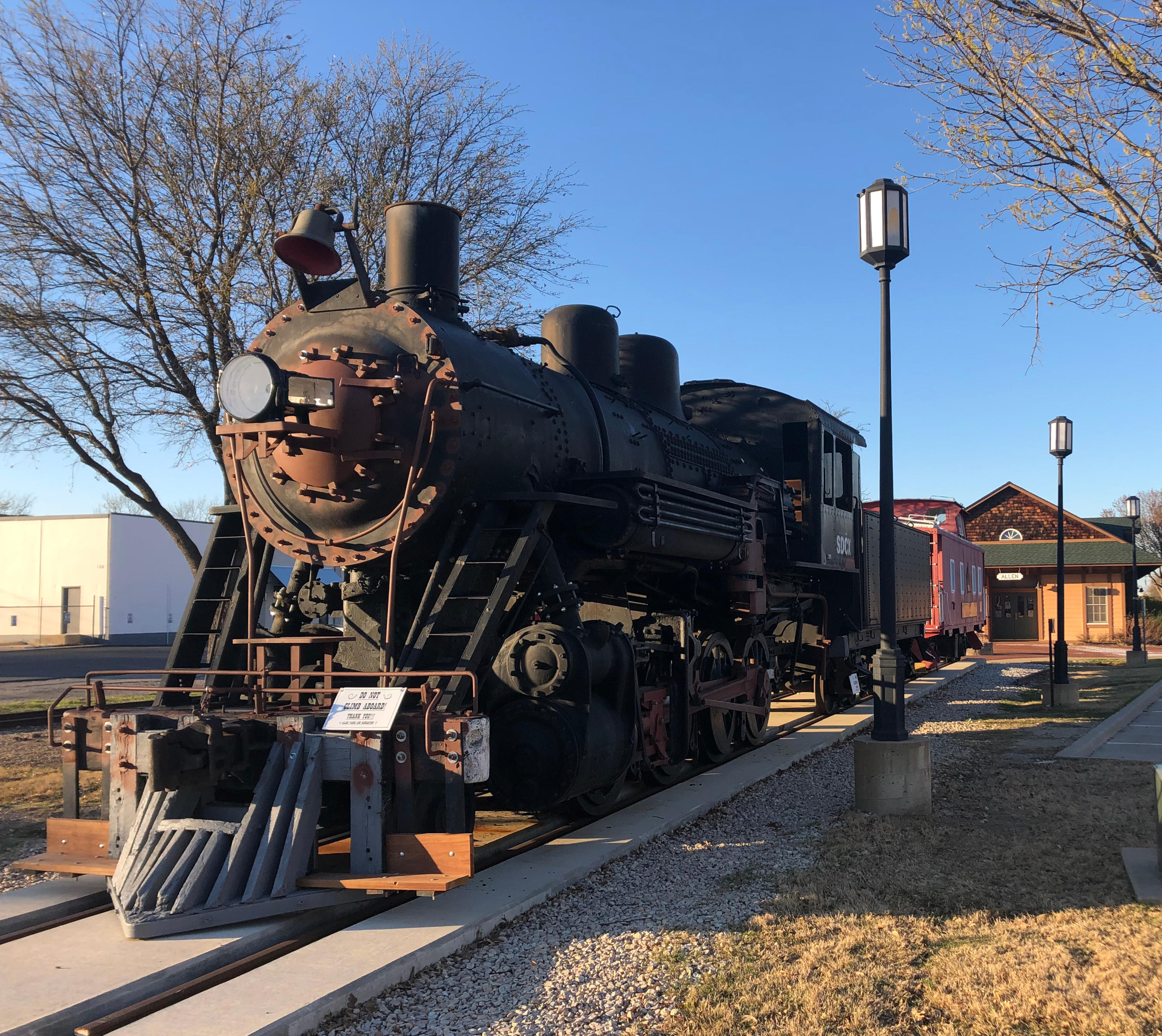
LS&I steam locomotive at the Allen Heritage Center

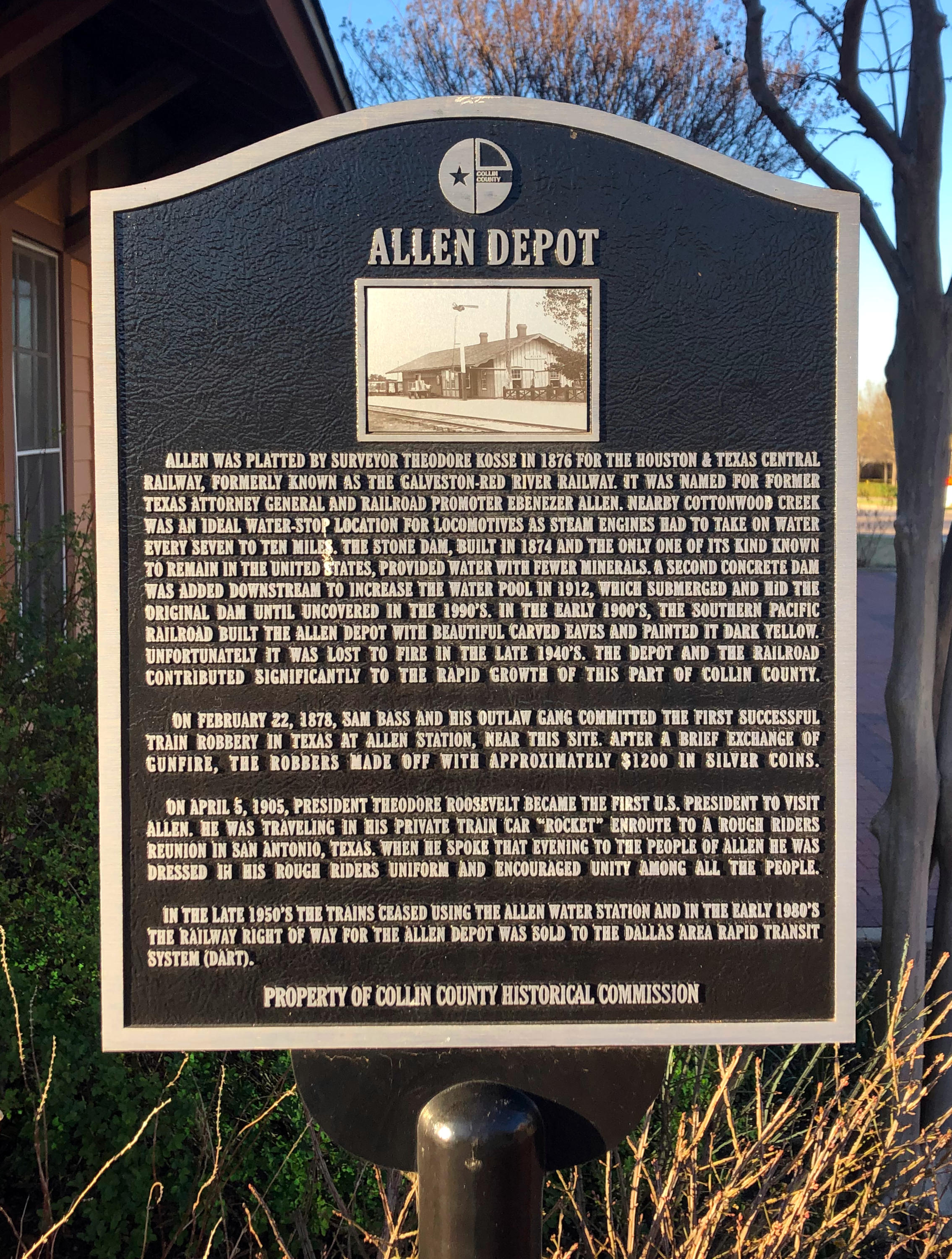
Allen Depot established in 1876 forming the Houston and Texas Central Railway

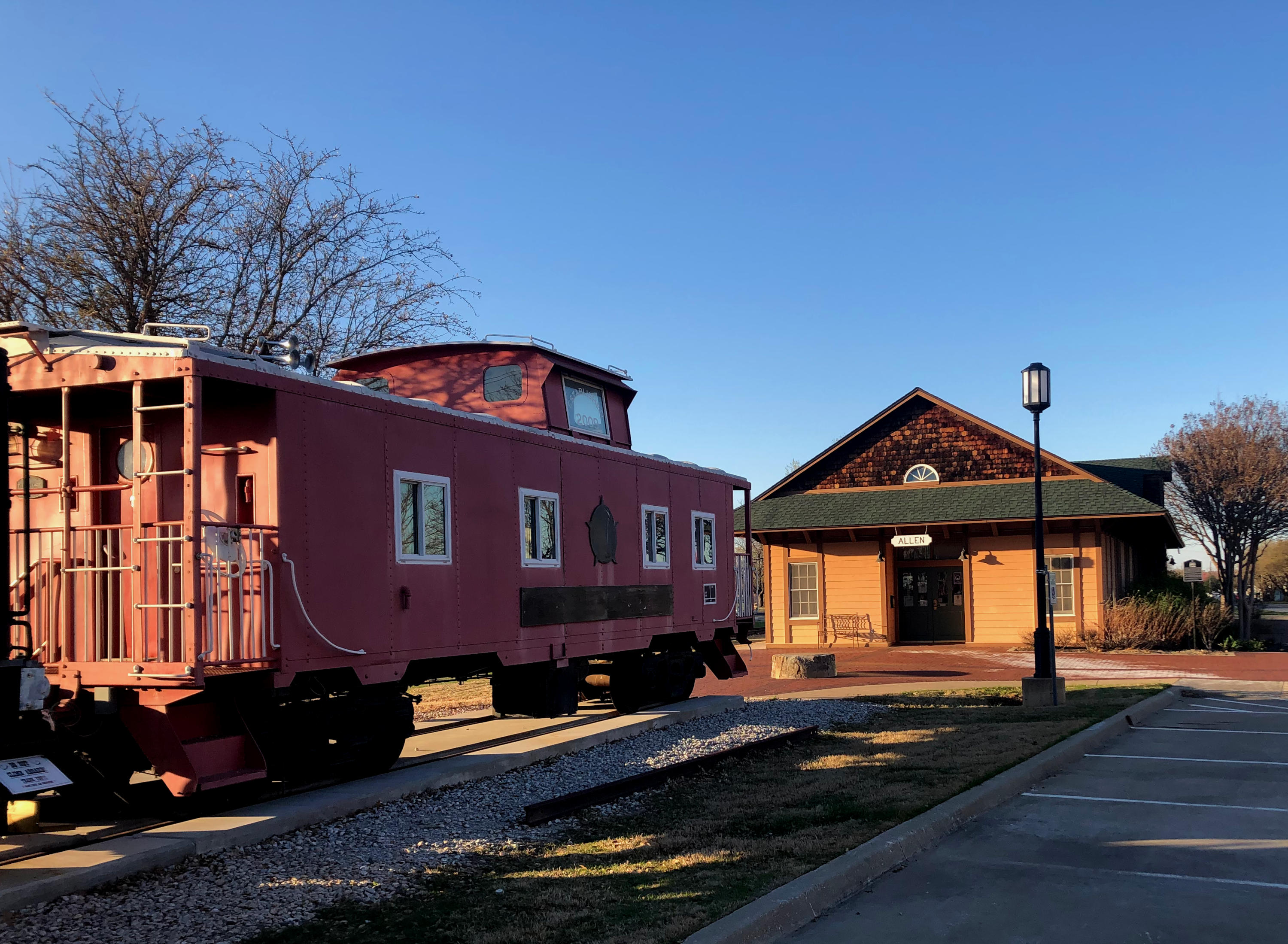
Village Express caboose at the Allen Heritage Center

== See also ==
- Allen Station, Texas Electric Railway
- Gulf Coast Lines
- List of Texas railroads
- Texas and Pacific Railway
- Texas Electric Railway
