= Allen Water Station =

- U.S. National Register of Historic Places
- U.S. Historic district
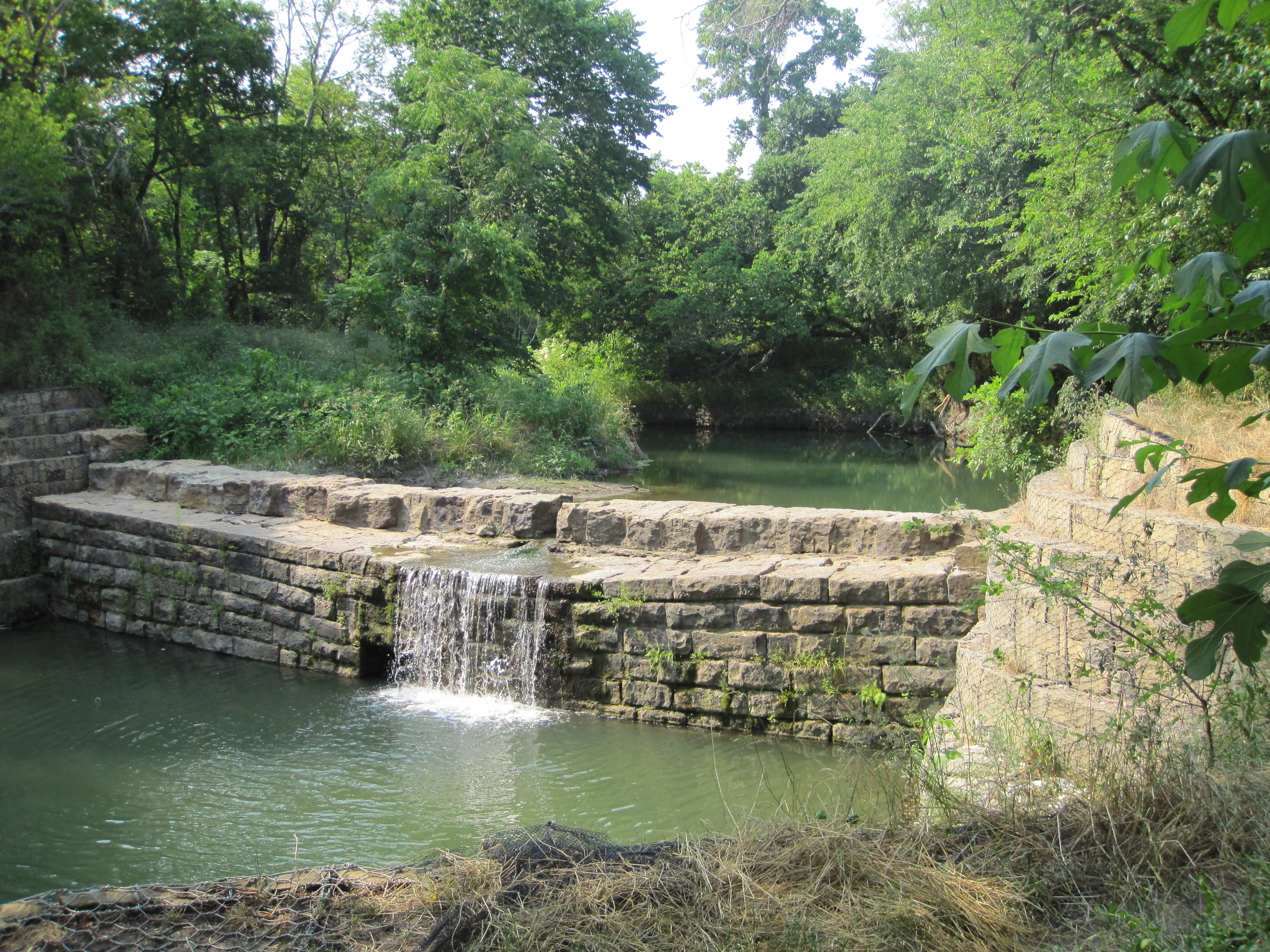
- Stone dam at Allen Water Station in 2012

- Location within Texas Location within the United States
- Location: N. of Exchange Pkwy on Cottonwood Creek, Allen, Texas
- Coordinates: 33°7′6″N 96°39′56″W
- Area: 5.7 acres (2.3 ha)
- Built by: Houston & Texas Central RR Co., Southern Pacific RR
- NRHP reference No.: 09000980
- Added to NRHP: December 3, 2009

The Allen Water Station is a district of structures in Allen, Texas representing different items built in the 1870s by the Houston and Texas Central Railroad at the Allen Depot water stop. The site includes six contributing structures: the Water Station site, the 1874 Dam, a section of railroad tracks and bed, a 1910 railroad bridge, and the ruins of the water tank and pumping facility.

== See also ==
- National Register of Historic Places listings in Collin County, Texas
