= CityLine/Bush station =

Public transit station in Richardson, Texas

CityLine/Bush
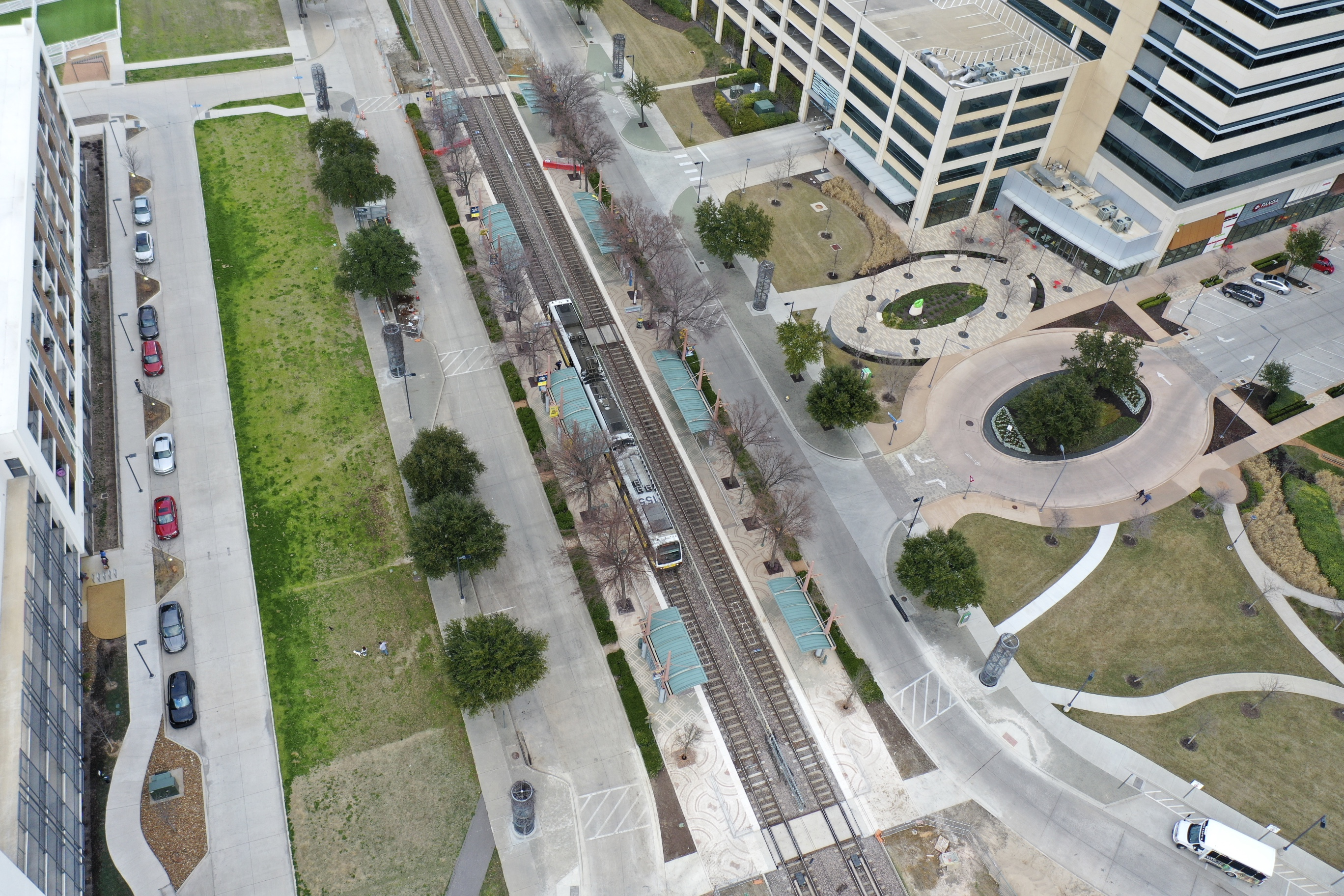
- Light rail platforms in 2020, prior to start of Silver Line construction

General information
- Location: 1300 East President George Bush Highway; Richardson, Texas
- Coordinates: 33°0′8″N 96°42′11″W
- System: DART rail
- Owner: Dallas Area Rapid Transit
- Platforms: 4 side platforms
- Tracks: 4
- Connections: DART: 232, 245, 883-UTD Comet Cruiser (M-Sun), East Telecom GoLink Zone (M-Sun)

Construction
- Structure type: At-grade
- Parking: 1,193 spaces
- Cycle facilities: Bike racks
- Accessible: Yes

History
- Opened: December 9, 2002
- Rebuilt: 2025 (Note: Addition of platforms and track for Silver Line; opened October 25, 2025.)
- Former names: Bush Turnpike

Services
Preceding station	DART	Following station
Galatyn Park toward Westmoreland	Red Line	12th Street toward Parker Road
Galatyn Park toward DFW Airport Terminal A	Orange Line (peak-hour only)	12th Street toward Parker Road
UT Dallas toward DFW Airport Terminal B	Silver Line	12th Street toward Shiloh Road
Location

CityLine/Bush station (formerly Bush Turnpike station) is a public transit station in Richardson, Texas. The station is located on a frontage road of President George Bush Turnpike (SH 190) about 1/3 mile (0.54 km) east of its interchange with North Central Expressway (US 75). The station serves the Red Line, the Silver Line, and, during peak periods, the Orange Line.

The station serves the mixed-use development CityLine, and it is also a park-and-ride lot for commuters using PGBT. A shuttle route, dubbed the Comet Cruiser, connects the station to the University of Texas at Dallas.

== History ==
=== Planning and construction ===
Original plans for the North Central Corridor Extension, which consisted of the modern-day Red Line north of Park Lane, included a station located near the Bush Turnpike/North Central interchange. The station was deferred to a secondary build-out phase, which would occur between 2006 and 2011. DART determined four possible locations, three in Plano and one in Richardson.

In 2000, DART selected the Richardson location and opted to construct the station alongside the rest of the Red Line, as it would be more expensive to defer it. The station opened on December 9, 2002, alongside the Downtown Plano and Parker Road stations.

=== Parking ===
Bush Turnpike station opened with 825 parking spaces, were located under an elevated segment of PGBT. This made Bush Turnpike the only DART station to have covered parking. The opening of Bush Turnpike and Parker Road ended parking capacity issues at Arapaho Center, which had previously been the northernmost station with parking. In 2007, DART added 380 additional spaces.

In 2012, DART introduced a paid parking initiative at Parker Road station, which would charge a daily fee to riders that were not residents of a DART member city. Because the initiative did not apply to Bush Turnpike station, many commuters moved to parking there, with an estimated 300 additional cars per day. In response, DART considered adding the parking fee to Bush Turnpike. This did not occur, and the parking initiative was ended in 2014.

=== Development ===
At opening, the area surrounding Bush Turnpike station was undeveloped. The vacant nature of the land served as inspiration for the station's design, which sported a rustic theme with several 20-foot (6.1 m) illuminated topiaries.

In 2010, Parliament Group, which owned 300 acres of land east of the station, announced plans for a large mixed-use development on the land, which would include residential, office, and retail space. In 2012, it was announced that insurance firm State Farm would lease office space at the development.

Construction of the development, named CityLine, started in 2013 with a projected completion date of 2015. On March 14, 2016, the station was renamed to CityLine/Bush after the development.

=== Silver Line ===
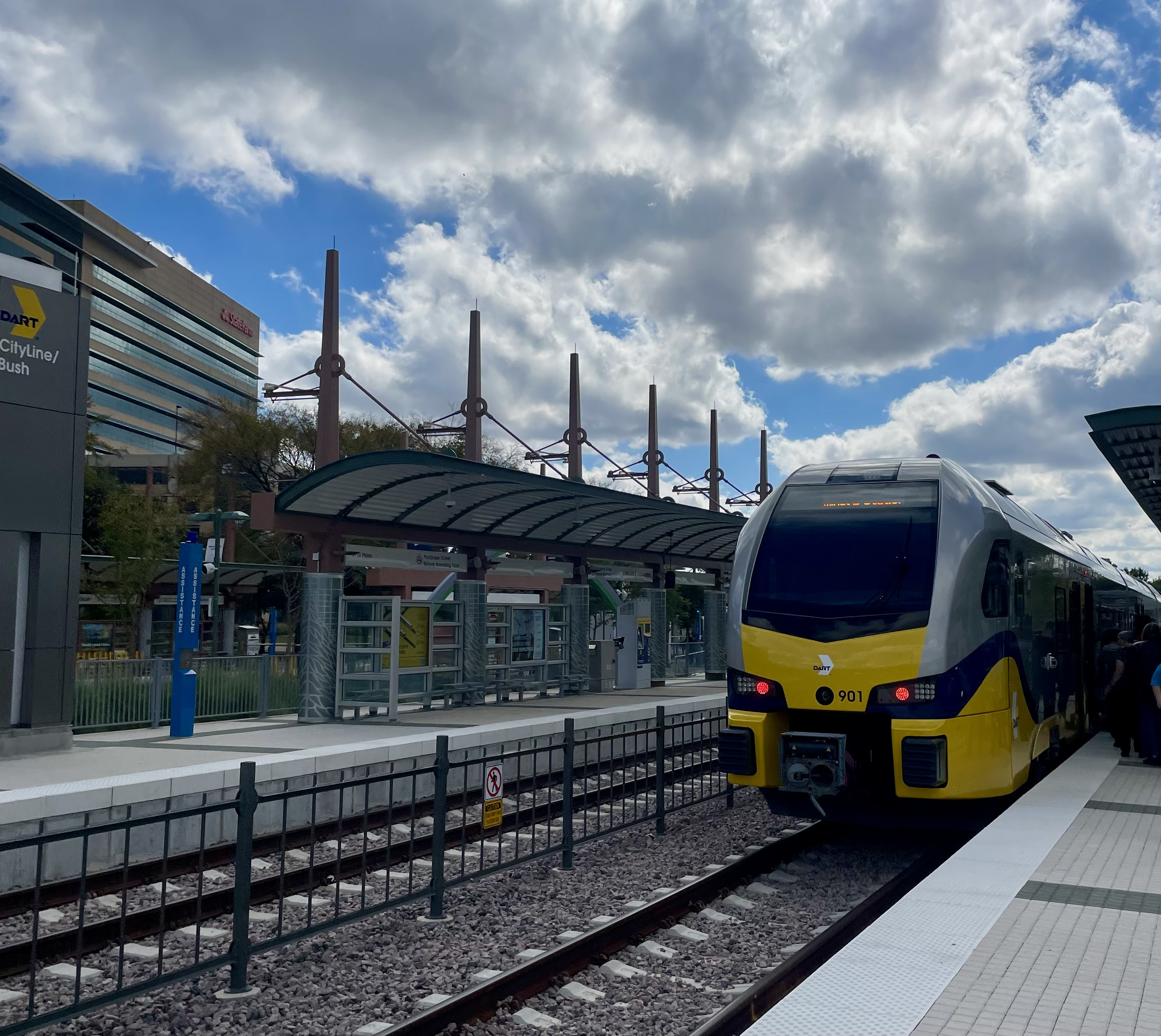
A Silver Line train loading passengers at CityLine/Bush station.

In 1990, DART obtained a former St. Louis Southwestern rail corridor for use as a potential commuter rail corridor. The 54-mile (87 km) corridor, nicknamed the Cotton Belt, ran from Fort Worth to Wylie, passing just north of Richardson through Plano. The corridor was divided between DART and the Fort Worth Transportation Authority, with DART's segment containing all parts of the corridor east of Dallas Fort Worth International Airport.

In 2010, the city of Plano proposed 12th Street, a new station that would serve as the eastern terminus of the corridor. Following this, the city of Richardson announced two proposals that would integrate Bush Turnpike to the line. One proposal would eliminate 12th Street entirely, instead routing the line south to Bush Turnpike. The other would divert the line south to Bush Turnpike, then run it northward to 12th Street.

In 2018, DART approved a commuter rail service on the Cotton Belt corridor, which was named the Silver Line. The approved plan included both the Bush Turnpike and 12th Street stations using a southern diversion based on Richardson's proposal. The diversion required the creation of a bridge over North Central Expressway, which was paid for by both Richardson and DART.

Construction of the line began in 2019, and the line opened on October 25, 2025. The Silver Line platforms at CityLine/Bush are directly adjacent to the existing light rail platforms, with a green space and several decorative arches connecting them.
