= Downtown Plano station =

DART rail station in Plano, Texas

Downtown Plano
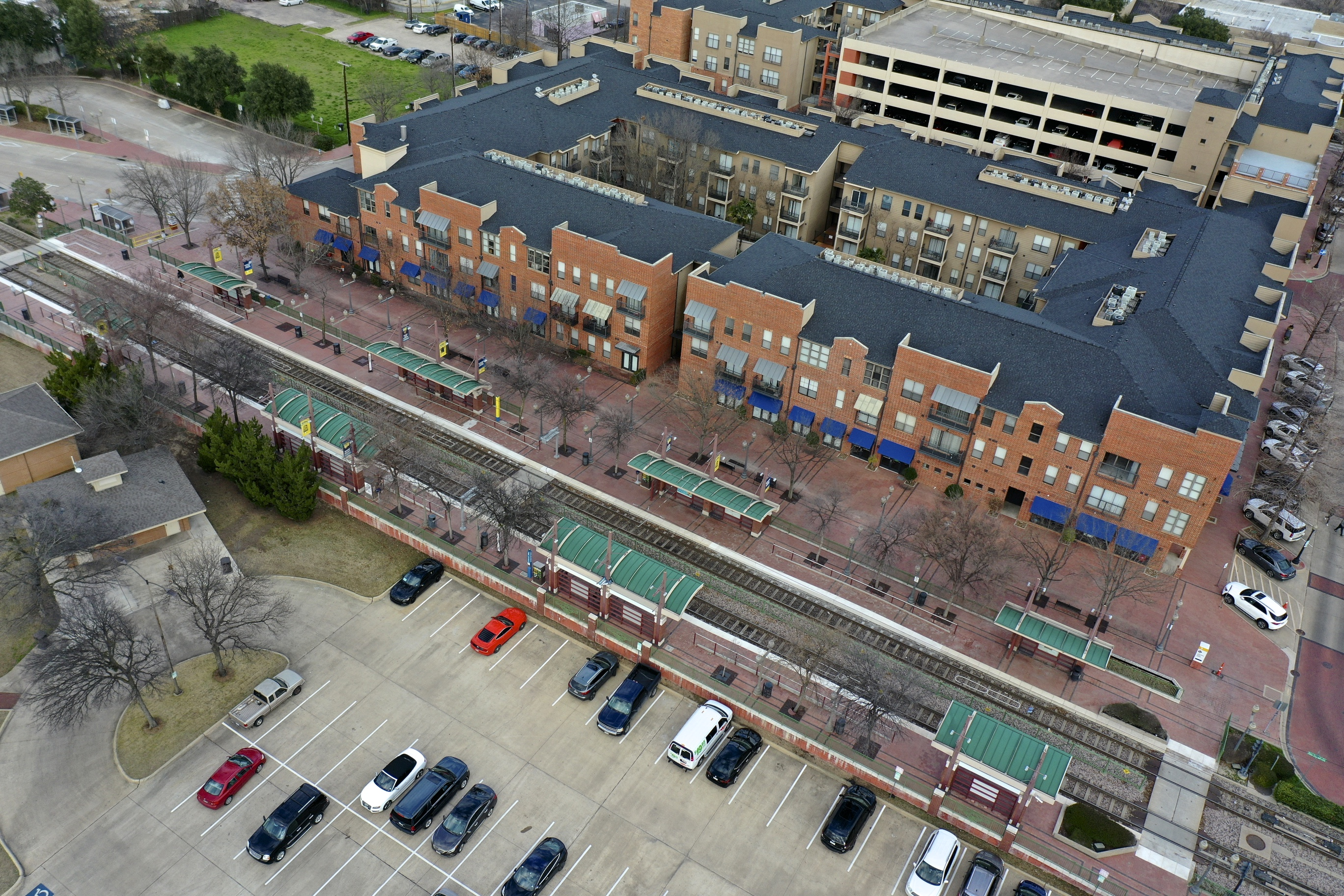
- Downtown Plano station and adjacent transit-oriented development

General information
- Location: 1001 East 16th Street; Plano, Texas
- Coordinates: 33°1′15″N 96°42′3″W
- System: DART rail
- Owner: Dallas Area Rapid Transit
- Platforms: 2 side platforms
- Connections: DART: 236 and 247; East Plano GoLink Zone (M-Sun); South Central Plano GoLink Zone (M-Sun)

Construction
- Structure type: At-grade
- Parking: None
- Cycle facilities: 3 bike lockers, 1 bike rack
- Accessible: Yes

History
- Opened: December 9, 2002

Services
| Preceding station | DART | Following station |
|---|---|---|
| 12th Street toward Westmoreland | Red Line | Parker Road Terminus |
| 12th Street toward DFW Airport Terminal A | Orange Line (peak-hour only) | Parker Road toward LBJ/Central or Parker Road |
Location

Downtown Plano station is a DART rail station in Plano, Texas. The station is located in Plano's historic downtown district on the eastern side of Haggard Park. It serves the Red Line and, during peak periods, the Orange Line.

== History ==
=== Predecessor ===
The rail corridor through Downtown Plano was constructed by the Houston and Texas Central Railway in the late 19th century. The corridor was purchased by Dallas Area Rapid Transit in 1988.

The modern-day station site was previously used by the Texas Electric Railway interurban line from 1908 to 1948 as a passenger station. The Texas Electric Railway's station building, now used by the Interurban Railway Museum, is located in Haggard Park.

=== Modern station ===
In 1996, DART released preliminary plans for a downtown Plano station, tentatively named 15th Street. The station would be an at-grade structure on the south side of 15th Street with a small parking lot. The station plan was controversial among downtown merchants, as it would require the demolition of an antique mall and would cause traffic congestion. In 1998, the city of Plano approved a different location north of 15th Street. This location was three times larger and able to accommodate redevelopment, though it did not include any long-term parking. The station was slated to open in 2003.

In 2000, construction began on Transit Village, a $16 million transit-oriented development directly adjacent to the station, which contained both apartments and retail space. In 2002, the city of Plano announced renovations to Haggard Park, which is also adjacent to the station.

In March 2002, DART announced that construction of the North Central Corridor, which included Downtown Plano, was six months ahead of schedule. A sculpture of a steam locomotive-inspired horse, named "Iron Horse", was installed on the station platform.

On December 7, 2002, DART held an opening ceremony for the station. Dubbed "Super Saturday", the event offered a free preview service between the Bush Turnpike, Downtown Plano, and Parker Road stations, as well as a Christmas parade. The ceremony also commemorated the 100th anniversary of the Northern Texas Traction Company, the first interurban in the modern-day Dallas–Fort Worth metroplex. The station officially opened the following Monday.
