= Heritage Farmstead Museum =

Historic house in Texas, United States

- Ammie Wilson House
- U.S. National Register of Historic Places
- Recorded Texas Historic Landmark
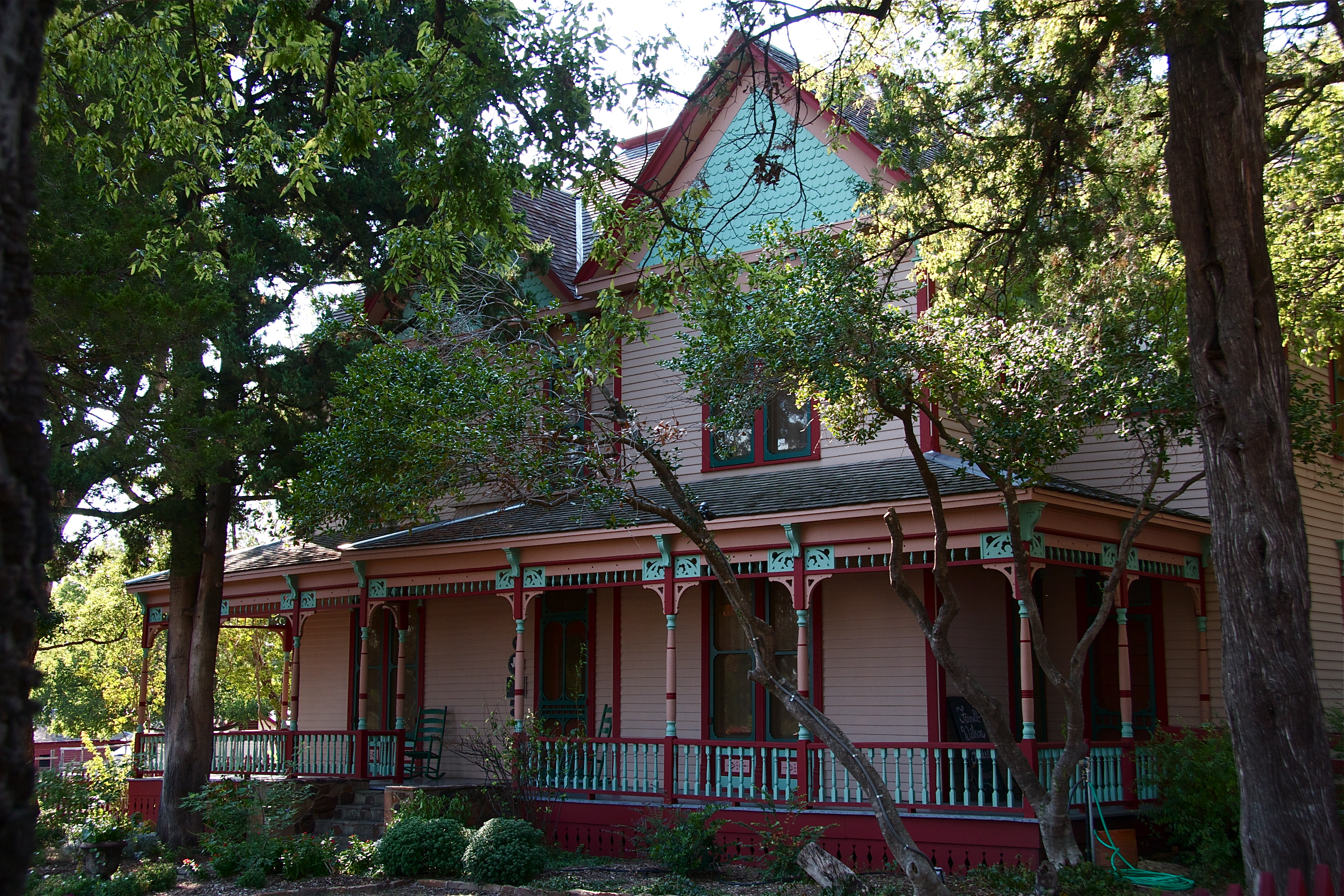
- Wilson House in 2012

- Location within Texas Location within the United States
- Interactive map showing Wilson House’s location
- Location: 1900 W. 15th St., Plano, Texas
- Coordinates: 33°1′8″N 96°43′52″W
- Area: 3.9 acres (1.6 ha)
- Built: 1891
- Architect: Bob Abernathy, Joshua Farrell
- Architectural style: Late Victorian
- NRHP reference No.: 78002906
- RTHL No.: 6220

Significant dates
- Added to NRHP: December 28, 1978
- Designated RTHL: 1978

Heritage Farmstead Museum (also known as the Ammie Wilson House) is a historic farm museum at 1900 West 15th Street in Plano, Texas.

The late-Victorian farm-house was built in 1891 on a 365-acre farm belonging to Mary Alice Farrell and her husband Hunter Farrell, a landowner and businessman whose family had moved to Texas from Virginia. The Farrells divorced in 1929 and eventually their daughter Ammie took over management of the farm and became an award-winning livestock breeder before her death in 1972. The farm was added to the National Register of Historic Places in 1978. In 1986 the farm opened as a living museum utilizing the remaining 4.5 acres surrounding the home. The museum is accredited by the American Alliance of Museums.

== See also ==
- National Register of Historic Places listings in Collin County, Texas
- Recorded Texas Historic Landmarks in Collin County
