= National Register of Historic Places listings in Collin County, Texas =

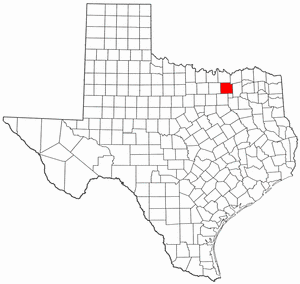
Location of Collin County in Texas

This is a list of the National Register of Historic Places listings in Collin County, Texas.

This is intended to be a complete list of properties and districts listed on the National Register of Historic Places in Collin County, Texas. There are seven districts, 62 individual properties, and one former property listed on the National Register in the county. Sixteen individually listed properties are Recorded Texas Historic Landmarks while four districts contain many more including one that is also a State Antiquities Landmark.

This National Park Service list is complete through NPS recent listings posted July 17, 2026.

== Current listings ==
The publicly disclosed locations of National Register properties and districts may be seen in a mapping service provided.

	Name on the Register	Image	Date listed	Location	City or town	Description
1	Allen Water Station	Allen Water Station	December 3, 2009 (#09000980)	North of Exchange parkway on Cottonwood Creek; 33°07′02″N 96°39′58″W	Allen	
2	Aston Building	Aston Building	June 30, 1983 (#83003131)	113 S. Main St. 33°09′46″N 96°21′34″W	Farmersville	Part of Farmersville Commercial Historic District
3	Beverly-Harris House	Beverly-Harris House	October 8, 1987 (#87001661)	604 Parker; 33°11′36″N 96°37′19″W	McKinney	Recorded Texas Historic Landmark; Historic Resources of McKinney MPS
4	John H. Bingham House	John H. Bingham House	June 27, 1988 (#87001662)	800 S. Chestnut; 33°11′24″N 96°36′50″W	McKinney	Historic Resources of McKinney MPS
5	Board-Everett House	Board-Everett House	October 8, 1987 (#87001663)	507 N. Bradley; 33°12′08″N 96°37′24″W	McKinney	Historic Resources of McKinney MPS
6	John R. Brown House	John R. Brown House	October 8, 1987 (#87001666)	509 N. Church; 33°12′06″N 96°37′02″W	McKinney	Historic Resources of McKinney MPS
7	Burrus-Finch House	Burrus-Finch House	June 27, 1988 (#87001671)	405 N. Waddill; 33°12′03″N 96°37′36″W	McKinney	Historic Resources of McKinney MPS
8	Celina Public School	Celina Public School	October 14, 2009 (#09000839)	205 S. Colorado St. 33°19′23″N 96°47′16″W	Celina	
9	U. P. Clardy House	U. P. Clardy House	October 8, 1987 (#87001679)	315 Oak; 33°12′00″N 96°37′27″W	McKinney	Historic Resources of McKinney MPS
10	Cline-Bass House	Cline-Bass House	June 27, 1988 (#87001681)	804 Tucker; 33°12′10″N 96°37′33″W	McKinney	Historic Resources of McKinney MPS
11	J. R. Coggins House	J. R. Coggins House	October 8, 1987 (#87001682)	805 Howell; 33°11′40″N 96°37′18″W	McKinney	Recorded Texas Historic Landmark; Historic Resources of McKinney MPS; also called John Martin House
12	Collin County Mill and Elevator Company	Collin County Mill and Elevator Company	October 8, 1987 (#87001685)	407 E. Louisiana; 33°11′51″N 96°36′34″W	McKinney	Historic Resources of McKinney MPS
13	Crouch-Perkins House	Crouch-Perkins House	October 8, 1987 (#87001691)	205 N. Church; 33°11′53″N 96°36′23″W	McKinney	Recorded Texas Historic Landmark; Historic Resources of McKinney MPS
14	H. L. Davis House	H. L. Davis House	October 8, 1987 (#87001695)	705 N. College; 33°12′13″N 96°37′15″W	McKinney	Recorded Texas Historic Landmark; Historic Resources of McKinney MPS
15	Davis-Hill House	Davis-Hill House	October 8, 1987 (#87001697)	710 N. Church; 33°12′19″N 96°36′59″W	McKinney	Historic Resources of McKinney MPS
16	J. S. Dowell House	J. S. Dowell House	October 8, 1987 (#87001699)	608 Parker; 33°11′35″N 96°37′20″W	McKinney	Historic Resources of McKinney MPS
17	Joe E. Dulaney House	Joe E. Dulaney House	October 8, 1987 (#87001704)	311 S. Chestnut; 33°11′41″N 96°36′46″W	McKinney	Recorded Texas Historic Landmark; Historic Resources of McKinney MPS
18	Joseph Field Dulaney House	Joseph Field Dulaney House	October 8, 1987 (#87001702)	315 S. Chestnut; 33°11′40″N 96°36′46″W	McKinney	Recorded Texas Historic Landmark; Historic Resources of McKinney MPS
19	Estes House	Estes House	November 29, 1995 (#95001365)	903 N. College St. 33°12′16″N 96°37′15″W	McKinney	Recorded Texas Historic Landmark; Historic Resources of McKinney MPS
20	F. C. Faires House	F. C. Faires House	October 8, 1987 (#87001705)	505 S. Chestnut; 33°11′32″N 96°36′47″W	McKinney	Historic Resources of McKinney MPS
21	Faires-Bell House	Faires-Bell House	October 8, 1987 (#87001706)	S side Chestnut Sq. 33°11′40″N 96°36′45″W	McKinney	Recorded Texas Historic Landmark; Historic Resources of McKinney MPS
22	Fairview H&TC Railroad Historic District		May 10, 2010 (#10000247)	About 1/4 mi. W of St HWY 5 on Sloan Creek & the former Houston & Texas Central Railroad tracks 33°08′50″N 96°38′28″W	Fairview	Houston and Texas Central Railway
23	Farmersville Commercial Historic District	Farmersville Commercial Historic District	February 21, 2017 (#100000670)	Along Main and McKinney Sts. 33°09′48″N 96°21′36″W	Farmersville	Includes Recorded Texas Historic Landmarks
24	Farmersville Masonic Lodge No. 214, A.F. and A.M.	Farmersville Masonic Lodge No. 214, A.F. and A.M.	March 30, 2005 (#05000245)	101 S. Main St. 33°09′55″N 96°21′35″W	Farmersville	Recorded Texas Historic Landmark; part of Farmersville Commercial Historic District
25	John H. Ferguson House	John H. Ferguson House	October 8, 1987 (#87001707)	607 N. Church; 33°12′10″N 96°37′02″W	McKinney	Historic Resources of McKinney MPS
26	Foote-Crouch House	Foote-Crouch House	June 27, 1988 (#87001708)	401 N. Benge; 33°11′40″N 96°37′03″W	McKinney	Historic Resources of McKinney MPS
27	S. H. Fox House	S. H. Fox House	October 8, 1987 (#87001709)	808 Tucker; 33°12′10″N 96°37′32″W	McKinney	Historic Resources of McKinney MPS
28	Jim B. Goodner House	Jim B. Goodner House	October 8, 1987 (#87001688)	302 S. Tennessee; 33°11′42″N 96°36′54″W	McKinney	Historic Resources of McKinney MPS
29	Gough-Hughston House	Gough-Hughston House	June 27, 1988 (#87001710)	1206 W. Louisiana; 33°11′50″N 96°37′36″W	McKinney	Recorded Texas Historic Landmark; Historic Resources of McKinney MPS
30	Heard-Craig House	Heard-Craig House	October 8, 1987 (#87001711)	205 W. Hunt; 33°11′55″N 96°37′00″W	McKinney	Recorded Texas Historic Landmark; Historic Resources of McKinney MPS
31	Ben Hill House	Ben Hill House	October 8, 1987 (#87001712)	509 Tucker; 33°12′08″N 96°37′42″W	McKinney	Historic Resources of McKinney MPS
32	John B. Hill House	John B. Hill House	October 8, 1987 (#87001713)	605 N. College; 33°12′10″N 96°37′15″W	McKinney	Historic Resources of McKinney MPS
33	Moran Hill House	Moran Hill House	October 8, 1987 (#87001714)	203 N. Waddill; 33°11′53″N 96°37′36″W	McKinney	Historic Resources of McKinney MPS
34	W. R. Hill House	W. R. Hill House	October 8, 1987 (#87001715)	601 N. College; 33°12′09″N 96°37′16″W	McKinney	Historic Resources of McKinney MPS
35	Hill-Webb Grain Elevator	Hill-Webb Grain Elevator	October 8, 1987 (#87001716)	400 E. Louisiana; 33°11′47″N 96°36′34″W	McKinney	Historic Resources of McKinney MPS
36	House at 1303 W. Louisiana	House at 1303 W. Louisiana	October 8, 1987 (#87001717)	1303 W. Louisiana; 33°11′48″N 96°37′39″W	McKinney	Historic Resources of McKinney MPS
37	House at 201 N. Graves	House at 201 N. Graves	October 8, 1987 (#87001718)	201 N. Graves; 33°11′55″N 96°37′47″W	McKinney	Historic Resources of McKinney MPS
38	House at 301 E. Lamar		October 8, 1987 (#87001719)	301 E. Lamar; 33°12′02″N 96°37′03″W	McKinney	Historic Resources of McKinney MPS
39	House at 610 Tucker		October 8, 1987 (#87001720)	610 Tucker; 33°12′10″N 96°37′38″W	McKinney	Historic Resources of McKinney MPS
40	House at 704 Parker	House at 704 Parker	October 8, 1987 (#87001721)	704 Parker; 33°11′33″N 96°37′20″W	McKinney	Historic Resources of McKinney MPS
41	Houses at 406 and 408 Heard	Houses at 406 and 408 Heard	October 8, 1987 (#87001722)	406 & 408 Heard; 33°12′16″N 96°37′05″W	McKinney	Historic Resources of McKinney MPS
42	John Johnson House	John Johnson House	October 8, 1987 (#87001723)	302 Anthony; 33°11′37″N 96°36′46″W	McKinney	Historic Resources of McKinney MPS
43	Thomas Johnson House	Thomas Johnson House	October 8, 1987 (#87001724)	312 S. Tennessee; 33°11′40″N 96°36′54″W	McKinney	Historic Resources of McKinney MPS
44	Mrs. J. C. King House	Mrs. J. C. King House	October 13, 1988 (#87001737)	405 W. Louisiana; 33°11′47″N 96°36′28″W	McKinney	Historic Resources of McKinney MPS
45	E. W. Kirkpatrick House and Barn	E. W. Kirkpatrick House and Barn	October 8, 1987 (#87001738)	903 Parker; 33°11′21″N 96°37′20″W	McKinney	Recorded Texas Historic Landmark; Historic Resources of McKinney MPS
46	McKinney Commercial Historic District	McKinney Commercial Historic District	January 10, 1983 (#83003132)	Roughly bounded by Herndon, Wood, Cloyd, Davis, Louisiana, MacDonald, and Virginia Sts. 33°11′51″N 96°36′51″W	McKinney	Includes State Antiquities Landmark, Recorded Texas Historic Landmarks
47	McKinney Cotton Compress Plant	McKinney Cotton Compress Plant	June 27, 1988 (#87001739)	300 blk. Throckmorton; 33°12′01″N 96°36′22″W	McKinney	Historic Resources of McKinney MPS
48	McKinney Cotton Mill Historic District	McKinney Cotton Mill Historic District	October 8, 1987 (#87001740)	Roughly bounded by Elm, RR tracks, Burrus, Fowler, & Amscott; 33°10′59″N 96°36′39″W	McKinney	Historic Resources of McKinney MPS
49	Old McKinney Hospital	Old McKinney Hospital	October 8, 1987 (#87001743)	700-800 S. College; 33°11′26″N 96°37′16″W	McKinney	Historic Resources of McKinney MPS
50	McKinney Residential Historic District	McKinney Residential Historic District	October 8, 1987 (#87001744)	Roughly bounded by W. Lamar, N. Benge, W. Louisiana, & N. Oak; 33°11′56″N 96°37′15″W	McKinney	Includes Recorded Texas Historic Landmarks; Historic Resources of McKinney MPS
51	Sam Neathery House	Sam Neathery House	June 27, 1988 (#87001745)	215 N. Waddill; 33°11′56″N 96°37′36″W	McKinney	Historic Resources of McKinney MPS
52	J. P. Nenney House	J. P. Nenney House	June 27, 1988 (#87001746)	601 N. Church; 33°12′07″N 96°37′02″W	McKinney	Historic Resources of McKinney MPS
53	R. F. Newsome House	R. F. Newsome House	October 8, 1987 (#87001747)	609 Tucker; 33°12′08″N 96°37′38″W	McKinney	Historic Resources of McKinney MPS
54	Newsome-King House	Newsome-King House	October 8, 1987 (#87001748)	401 W. Louisiana; 33°11′48″N 96°36′27″W	McKinney	Historic Resources of McKinney MPS
55	Plano Downtown Historic District	Plano Downtown Historic District	July 24, 2017 (#100001372)	1000 blk. & 1112 E. 15th St., 1020 E. 15th Pl., 1410-1416 J & 1416-1430 K Aves., 33°01′11″N 96°42′00″W	Plano	Includes Recorded Texas Historic Landmarks
56	Plano Station, Texas Electric Railway	Plano Station, Texas Electric Railway	August 10, 2005 (#05000856)	901 E 15th St. 33°01′11″N 96°42′06″W	Plano	Recorded Texas Historic Landmark; now Interurban Railway Museum
57	John C. Rhea House	John C. Rhea House	June 27, 1988 (#87001749)	801 N. College; 33°12′14″N 96°37′15″W	McKinney	Recorded Texas Historic Landmark; Historic Resources of McKinney MPS
58	Saigling House	Saigling House	May 14, 2018 (#100002434)	902 E 16th St. 33°01′16″N 96°42′09″W	Plano	
59	A. M. Scott House	A. M. Scott House	October 8, 1987 (#87001750)	1109 W. Louisiana; 33°11′48″N 96°37′34″W	McKinney	Historic Resources of McKinney MPS
60	L. A. Scott House	L. A. Scott House	June 27, 1988 (#87001751)	513 W. Louisiana; 33°11′48″N 96°37′15″W	McKinney	Historic Resources of McKinney MPS
61	Sister Grove Creek Site	Sister Grove Creek Site	August 22, 1977 (#77001432)	Address restricted	Farmersville	
62	W. D. Smith House	W. D. Smith House	October 8, 1987 (#87001752)	703 N. College; 33°12′11″N 96°37′15″W	McKinney	Historic Resources of McKinney MPS
63	J. H. Taylor House	J. H. Taylor House	October 8, 1987 (#87001753)	211 N. Waddill; 33°11′55″N 96°37′36″W	McKinney	Historic Resources of McKinney MPS
64	Texas Pool		April 1, 2019 (#100003598)	901 Springbrook Dr. 33°00′44″N 96°43′19″W	Plano	
65	Thompson House	Thompson House	October 8, 1987 (#87001754)	1207 W. Louisiana; 33°11′48″N 96°37′37″W	McKinney	Recorded Texas Historic Landmark; Historic Resources of McKinney MPS
66	R. L. Waddill House	R. L. Waddill House	October 8, 1987 (#87001755)	302 W. Lamar; 33°12′02″N 96°36′46″W	McKinney	Historic Resources of McKinney MPS
67	Thomas W. Wiley House	Thomas W. Wiley House	October 8, 1987 (#87001756)	105 S. Church; 33°11′48″N 96°37′01″W	McKinney	Historic Resources of McKinney MPS
68	A. G. Wilson House	A. G. Wilson House	October 8, 1987 (#87001757)	417 N. Waddill; 33°12′05″N 96°37′36″W	McKinney	Historic Resources of McKinney MPS
69	Ammie Wilson House	Ammie Wilson House	December 28, 1978 (#78002906)	1900 W. 15th St. 33°01′08″N 96°43′52″W	Plano	Recorded Texas Historic Landmark

== Former listing ==
	Name on the Register	Image	Date listed	Date removed	Location	City or town	Description
1	Collin McKinney Cabin	Collin McKinney Cabin	September 18, 1978 (#78002905)	April 14, 1981	Finch Park	McKinney	Recorded Texas Historic Landmark. Destroyed by fire on December 10, 1980.

== See also ==
- National Register of Historic Places listings in Texas
- Recorded Texas Historic Landmarks in Collin County
