= Farmersville Masonic Lodge No. 214, A.F. and A.M. =

Historic building in Texas, United States

- U.S. National Register of Historic Places
- U.S. Historic district – Contributing property
- Recorded Texas Historic Landmark
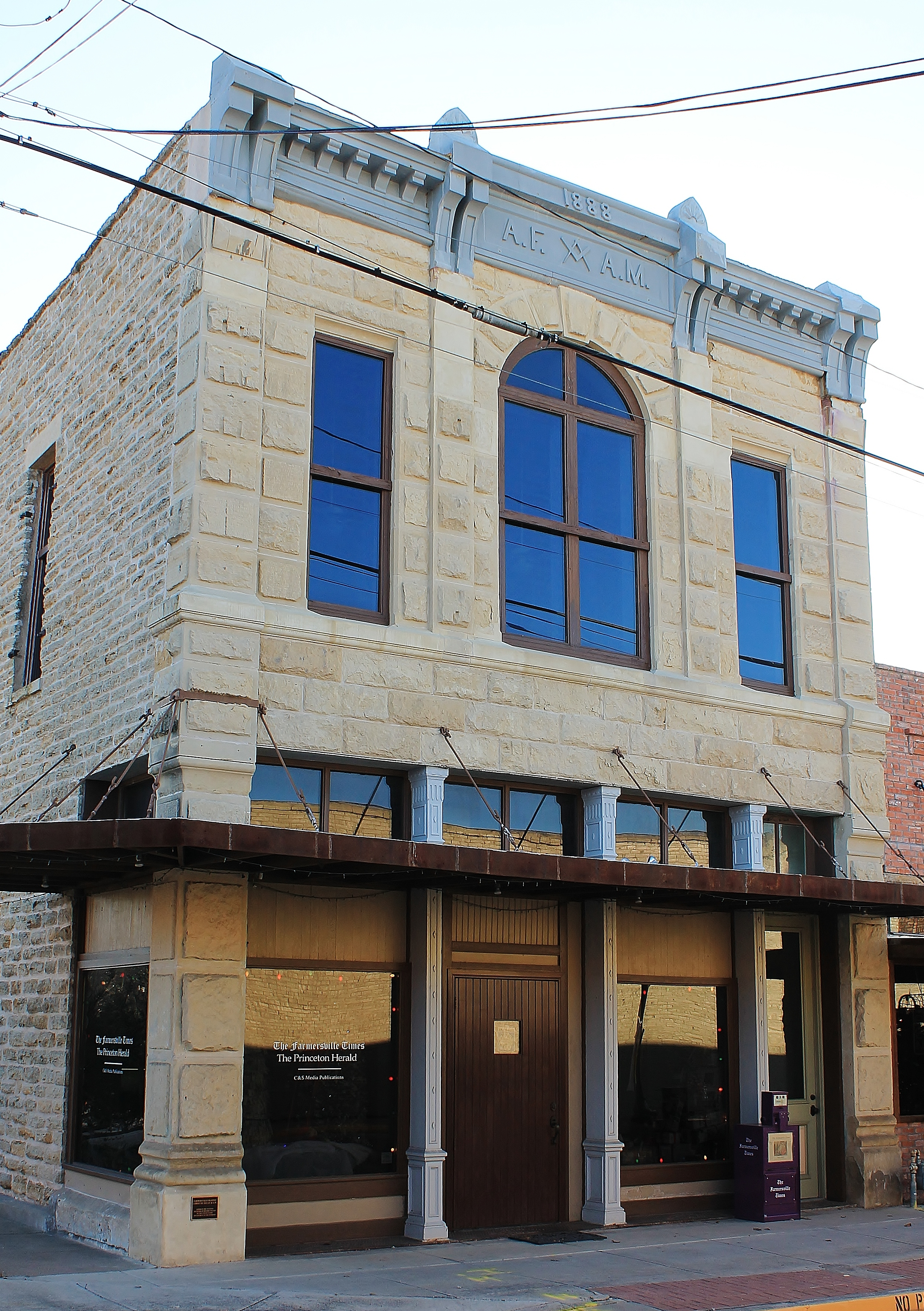
- Masonic lodge building in 2013

- Location within Texas Location within the United States
- Location: 101 S. Main St., Farmersville, Texas
- Coordinates: 33.1636°N 96.3598°W
- Area: less than one acre
- Built: 1888
- Architectural style: Italianate
- Part of: Farmersville Commercial Historic District (ID100000670)
- NRHP reference No.: 05000245
- RTHL No.: 13979

Significant dates
- Added to NRHP: March 30, 2005
- Designated CP: February 21, 2017
- Designated RTHL: 2007

The Farmersville Masonic Lodge No. 214, A.F. and A.M. is a historic Italianate building located in Farmersville, Texas. It was constructed in 1888 as a meeting hall for Farmersville Lodge No. 214 (a local Masonic lodge).

The building was listed on the National Register of Historic Places (under the name: "Farmersville Masonic Lodge No. 214, A.F. and A.M.") in 2005.

Later, the building houses the Farmersville Times, a local area newspaper and Farmersville lodge meets elsewhere.

== See also ==
- National Register of Historic Places listings in Collin County, Texas
- Recorded Texas Historic Landmarks in Collin County
