= 12th Street station (DART) =

Public transit station in Plano, Texas

12th Street
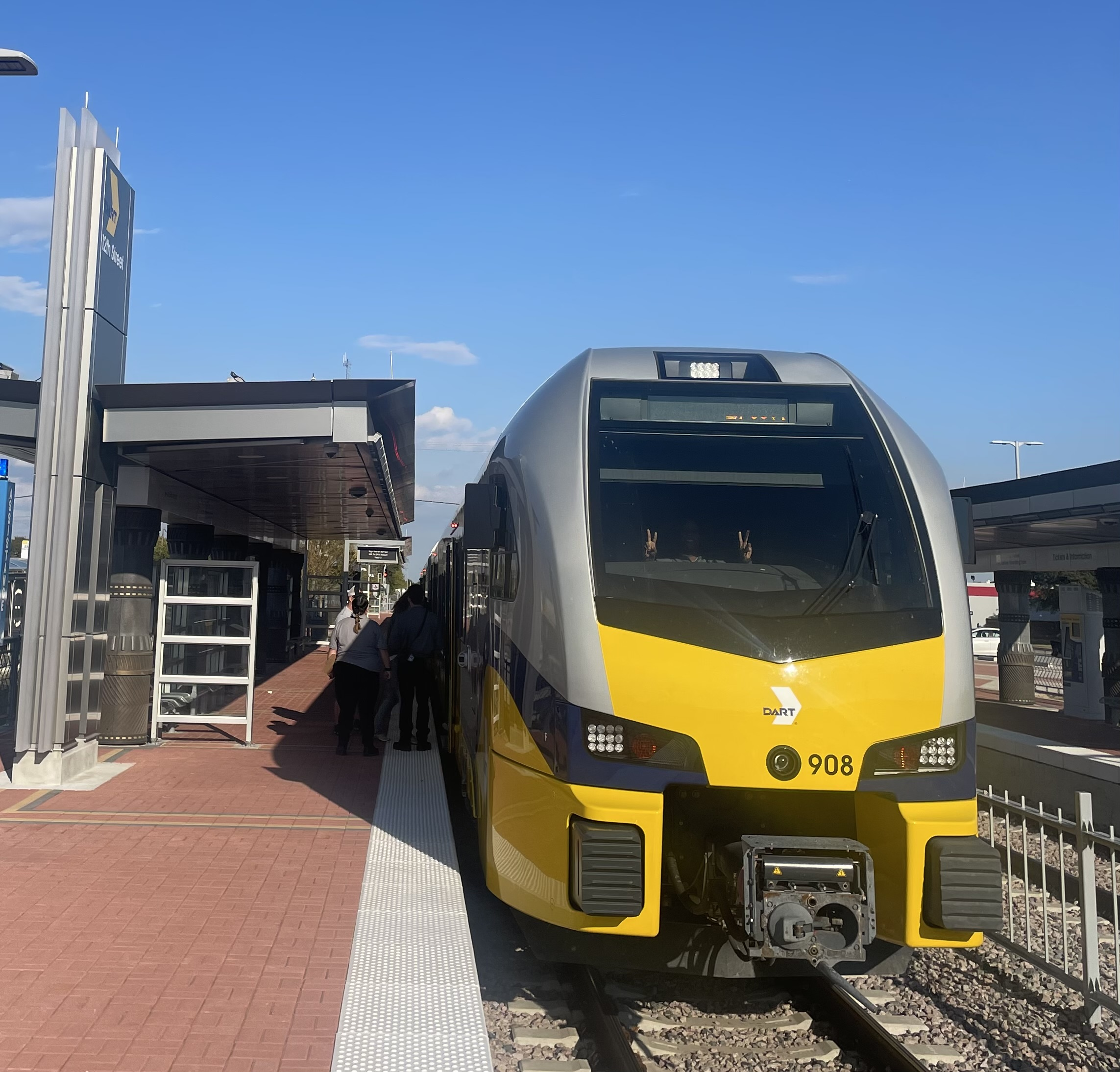
- Silver Line train at ground station (2025)

General information
- Location: 1180 12th Street; Plano, Texas
- Coordinates: 33.015417°N 96.699278°W
- System: DART rail
- Owner: Dallas Area Rapid Transit
- Platforms: Red/Orange: 2 side platforms Silver: 2 side platforms
- Tracks: Red/Orange: 2 Silver: 2
- Connections: DART: 236, 247; East Plano GoLink Zone (M-Sun), South Central Plano GoLink Zone (M-Sun)

Construction
- Structure type: Red/Orange: Elevated; Silver: At-grade
- Parking: 313 spaces
- Accessible: Yes

History
- Opened: October 25, 2025; 10 months ago

Services
Preceding station	DART	Following station
CityLine/Bush toward Westmoreland	Red Line	Downtown Plano toward Parker Road
CityLine/Bush toward DFW Airport Terminal A	Orange Line (peak-hour only)	Downtown Plano toward Parker Road
CityLine/Bush toward DFW Airport Terminal B	Silver Line	Shiloh Road Terminus
Location

12th Street station is a public transit station in Plano, Texas. Operated by Dallas Area Rapid Transit, the station services DART rail's Red Line and the Silver Line hybrid rail. During peak transit hours, it also services the Orange Line. The station is a transfer point between the three lines, and it also serves the 12th Street neighborhood and the historically black Douglass Community.

The station opened alongside the Silver Line on October 25, 2025, becoming the third infill station on the DART rail system after Lake Highlands and Hidden Ridge.

== Station ==
The station consists of two separate platforms. The Silver Line platform, located at ground level at the intersection of 12th Street and K Avenue, features a 313-space parking lot, a passenger drop-off area, and five bus bays. The platform has an industrial theme, representing the neighborhood's past.

The elevated light rail platform is located two blocks west at 1000 12th Street, with a 500-foot (150 m) long sidewalk connecting the platforms. The platform is decorated with an air theme, and its 16 windscreens feature historic photographs of the Douglass Community.

== History ==
The station is located along the Cotton Belt, a 54-mile (87 km) rail corridor between Fort Worth and Wylie. Built in 1871 by the St. Louis Southwestern Railway, the corridor was purchased by DART in 1990 for a potential commuter rail line.

In 2010, the city of Plano issued a proclamation in support of the commuter rail corridor, which suggested creating a station at 12th Street to serve as the line's eastern terminus. The city of Richardson issued a competing proposal with Bush Turnpike station as the terminus. DART ultimately chose a plan which included both stations, though neither ended up being the terminus.

In February 2015, the city of Plano purchased a 2.6-acre tract for the station. Construction of the elevated light rail station began on August 26, 2023.

As the station is located in a historically industrial area, the city of Plano created a comprehensive plan to re-zone and encourage development in the area, dubbed Plano Tomorrow.
