= Allen station (Texas Electric Railway) =

Texas electric railway station

Allen
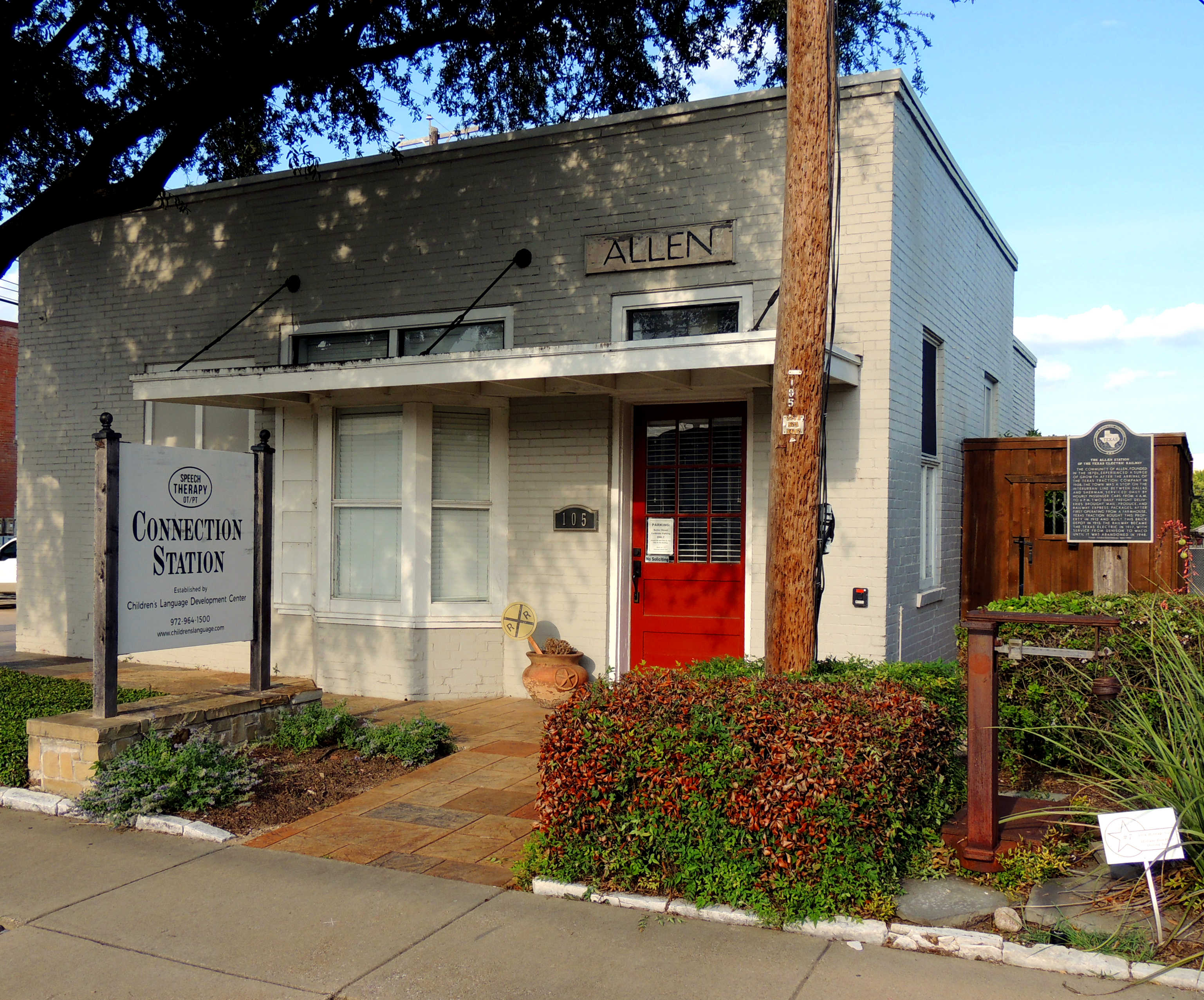
- The station building in 2021

General information
- Location: 105 South Butler Drive; Allen, Texas 75013; USA
- Coordinates: 33.10256°N 96.67093°W
- Owner: Texas Traction Company

Construction
- Structure type: at-grade

History
- Opened: 1 July 1908
- Closed: 31 December 1948

Former services
Preceding station	Texas Electric Railway	Following station
McKinney toward Denison	Dallas - Denison	Plano toward Dallas
Location

Allen station was established as a wood frame farmhouse servicing the Texas Electric Railway interurban rail line from Dallas, Texas to Sherman, Texas in 1908. The Texas Interurban Railway routed hourly passenger railcars or streetcars for access to the Dallas business district and Dallas Farmers Market district. The electric rail supported two freight delivery services transporting mail, parcel post packages, and produce from the 6 A.M. to 6 P.M. hours incorporating the North Texas vicinity.

In 1912, the Texas Traction Company purchased the property constructing a new building for railway station services. By 1913, the depot was completed as a brick and mortar structure with continuation of full railway services from Dallas to Sherman. In 1917, the railway was entitled the Texas Electric Railway with service extended from Denison, Texas to Waco, Texas. The Texas Electric Railway abandoned the rail line and discontinued the rail services by 1948.

== Texas Historical Commission site ==
Allen Station received a historical marker in 1986 by the Texas Historical Commission recognizing the 1908 establishment as an integral chapter of the Texas railroad history.

== Gallery ==
Allen Station of Texas Electric Railway
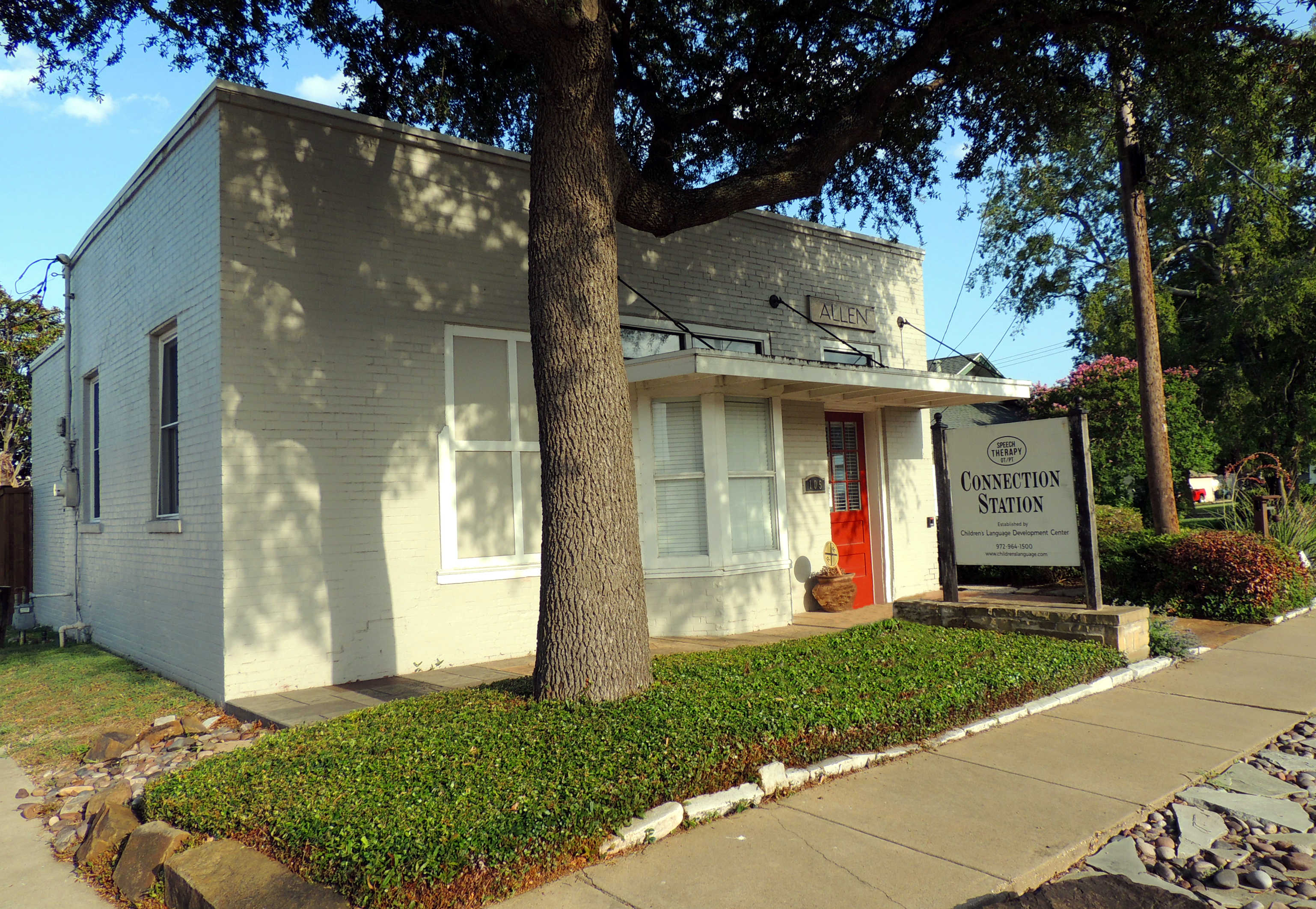
Allen Station completed in 1913 as brick and mortar structure

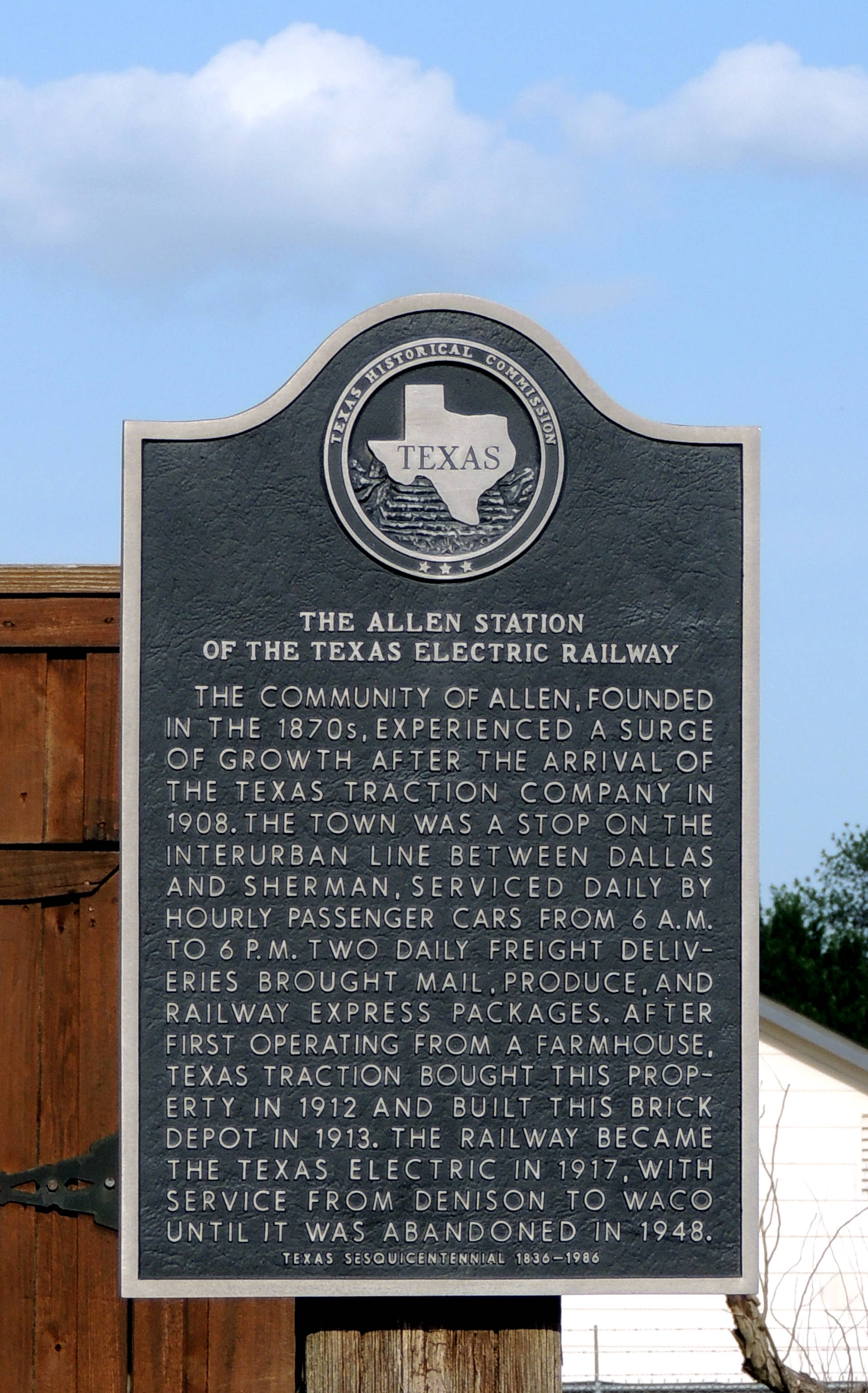
Texas Historical Commission marker at Texas Electric Railway Allen Station

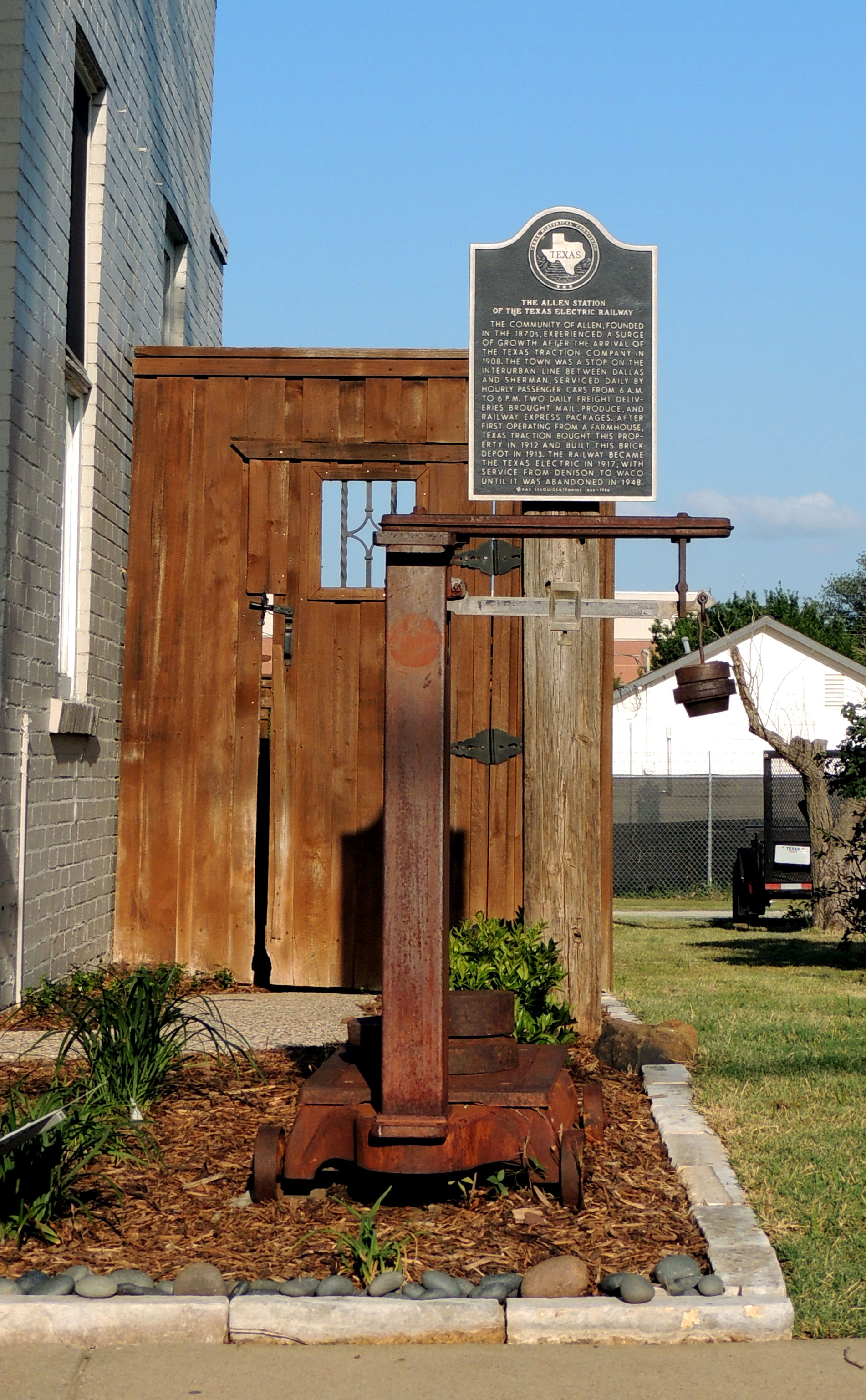
Cargo weight scale with Texas historical marker

== See also ==
- Allen Depot (Allen, Texas)
- Plano Station, Texas Electric Railway
- Texas Railroads
