= Red River City, Texas =

- Ghost Town
- Location within Texas Location within the United States
- Coordinates: 33.80288°N 96.53083°W
- Country: United States
- State: Texas
- County: Grayson County
- Established: 1873
- Elevation: 165 m (541 ft)
- Time zone: UTC−06:00 (CST)
  - Summer (DST): UTC−05:00 (CDT)
- FIPS code: 48-48181
- GNIS feature ID: 1377149, 4721947

In the early 1870s Red River City was a settlement in North Texas, just south of the Red River, which forms the border with the state of Oklahoma. With a population of about 50, it was served by a post office in 1873 and 1874.

In 1873 the Houston and Texas Central Railway line reached Red River City, where it connected with the Missouri, Kansas and Texas Railroad. This junction formed an all-railroad route from the main cities of Texas to St. Louis, Missouri and the Eastern United States. The railway crossed the Red River nearby over the Colbert Bridge, which was also completed in 1873, but destroyed by flooding that same year. The line reopened with the second Colbert Bridge in 1892, but it too was destroyed by flooding in 1908. The route was changed for the third bridge at Carpenters Bluff, which opened in 1910.

Red River City subsequently became part of Denison, Texas in Grayson County.

== See also ==
Allen Depot (Allen, Texas)
