= Evandberg Orphanage =

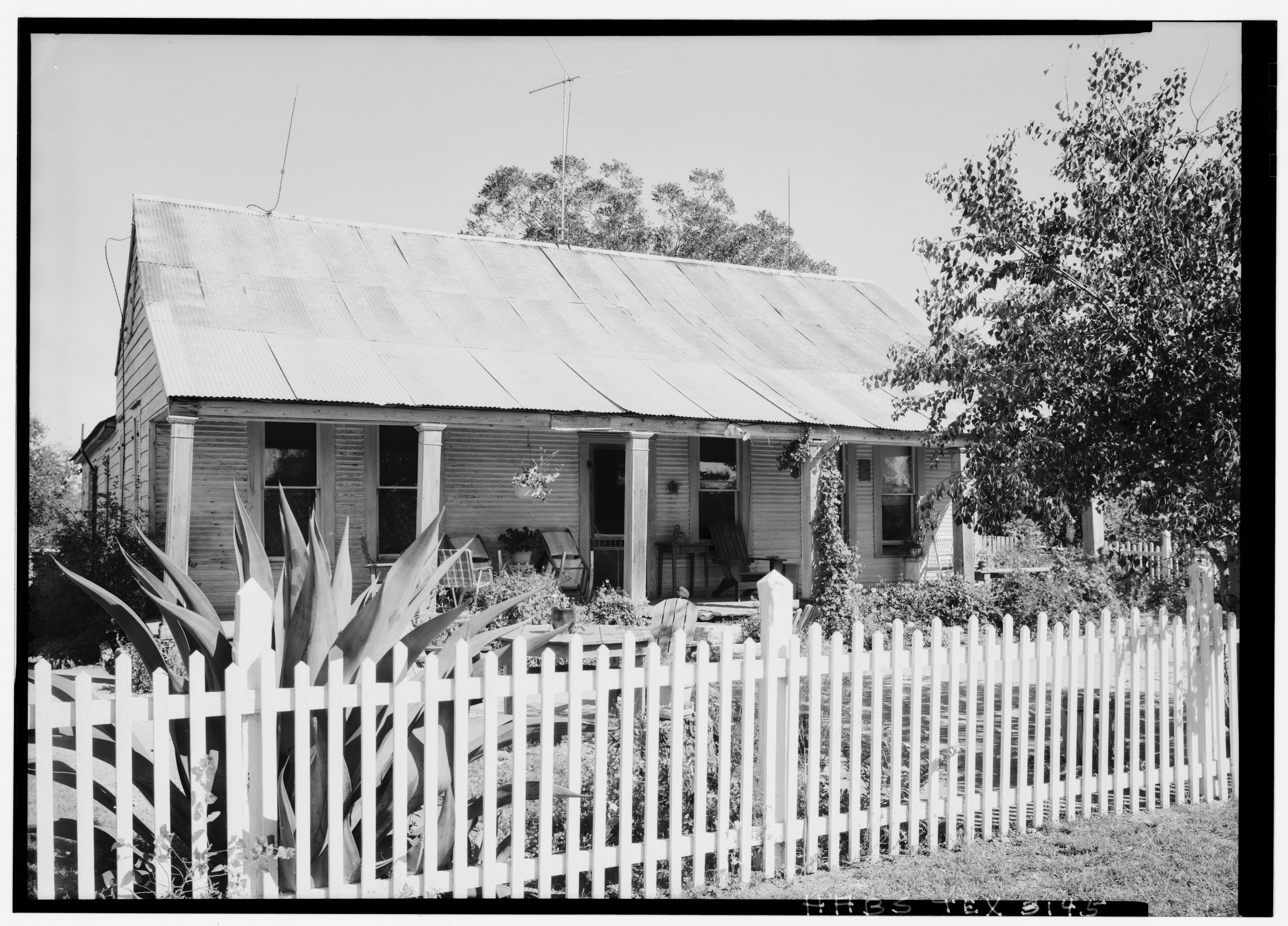
- Evandberg Orphanage ca. 1961

Address
- 1276 Ervendberg Street; Gruene, New Braunfels, Texas: Guadalupe River; Texas Hill Country; New Braunfels, Comal County, Texas 78130; United States
- Coordinates: 29.74081°N 98.10952°W

Information
- Other name: ☆ Das Waisenhaus (The Orphanage); ☆ New Wied; ☆ Western Texas Orphan Asylum
- Type: Indigent Children Asylum
- Established: 16 March 1848
- Founder: ♦ Louis Cachand Ervendberg; ♦ Ludwig Bene; ♦ Hermann Spiess
- Authority: Adelsverein
- Language: English; German
- Website: Waisenhaus (Orphanage)

Evandberg Orphanage was established as a guardianship orphanage located in Comal County, Texas approximately 3.5 mi (5.63 km) north of New Braunfels, Texas. The indigent children home was created by a charter enacted into state law by the 2nd Texas legislature on March 16, 1848. The Texas charter appointed Louis Cachand Ervendberg, Ludwig Bene, and Hermann Spiess being of German descent as founding directors of the displaced shelter for exiled children in the Central Texas region.

== German Colony Perils and Orphans Home Farm ==
The American frontier settlement was founded by the German Emigration Company often referred as the Adelsverein. The self-reliant homestead endured disease outbreak hardships during the preparatory years of the German Emigration Company establishment on the Texas Guadalupe River. Beginning in 1845, the German colony suffered an infectious disease epidemic inflicting cholera on the New Wied inhabitants. By 1846, the New Braunfels Cemetery confirmed three hundred and forty-eight interments in the New Braunfels burial grounds situated divergent to Old San Antonio Road.

== Texas Historical Commission Site ==
The Texas Historical Commission endorsed the Western Texas Orphan Asylum as the first orphanage in the state of Texas. The German Texan Waisenhaus site received a Texas Historic Landmark medallion and plate in 1970.

== See also ==
- Ferdinand Lindheimer
- Lindheimer House
- Prince Carl of Solms-Braunfels
- Rheingold School
