= Plano station (Texas Electric Railway) =

United States historic train station

- Plano Station, Texas Electric Railway
- U.S. National Register of Historic Places
- Recorded Texas Historic Landmark
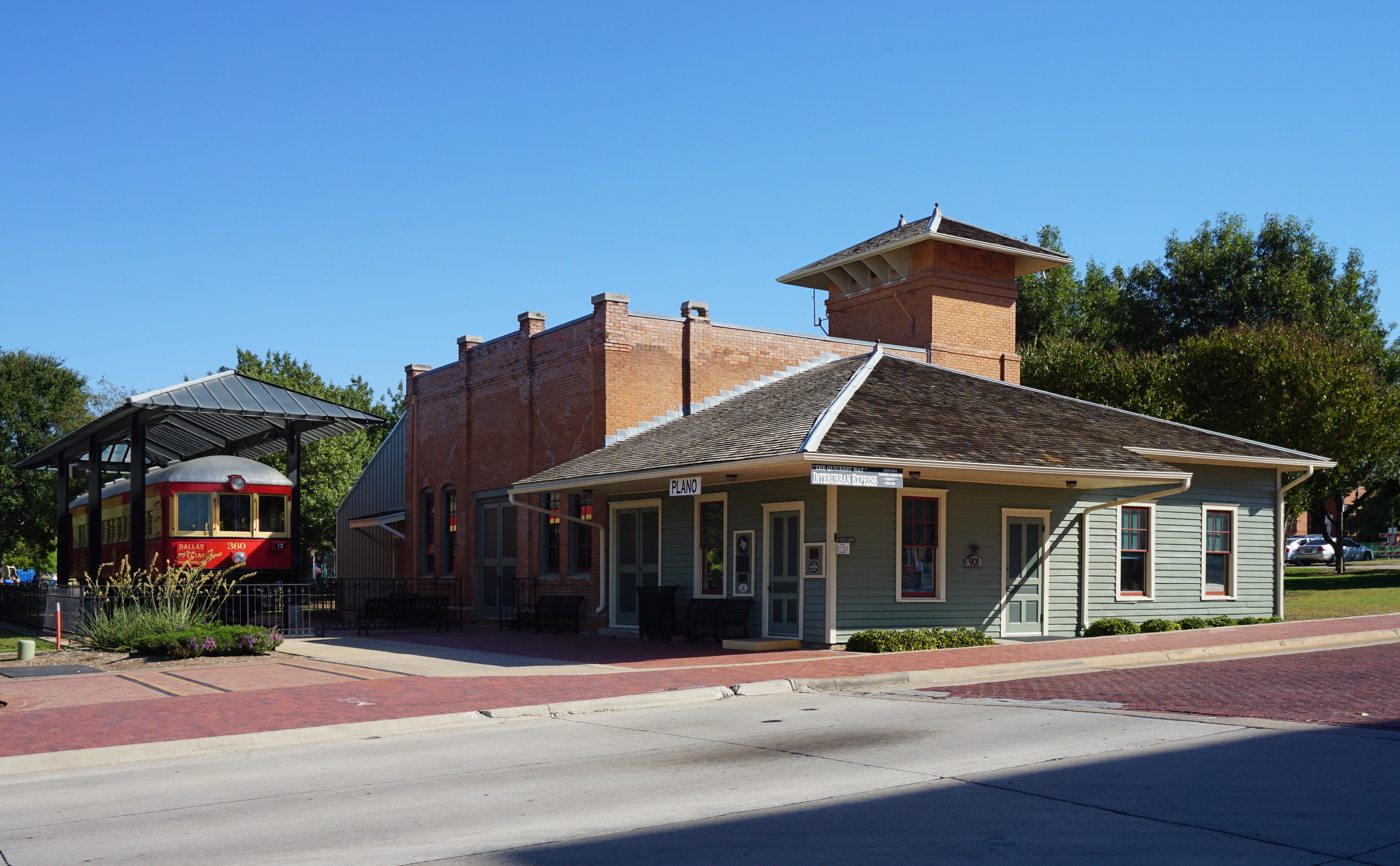
- Plano Station in 2015

- Location within Texas Location within the United States
- Location: 901 E 15th St., Plano, Texas
- Coordinates: 33°1′11″N 96°42′6″W
- Area: less than one acre
- Architect: Fred A. Jones Company, Dallas; Stone and Webster, Boston
- Architectural style: Mission/Spanish Revival
- NRHP reference No.: 05000856
- RTHL No.: 6210

Significant dates
- Added to NRHP: August 10, 2005
- Designated RTHL: 1990

Plano Station, Texas Electric Railway, now known as the Interurban Railway Museum, is a historic train station at 901 E 15th Street in Plano, Texas. It is still served by the Downtown Plano station of the Dallas Area Rapid Transit light rail, which reutilized the right of way of the interurban.

The Mission Revival/Spanish Revival style station was completed in 1908 at the opening of the Texas Electric Railway. The railway operated from 1908 to 1948. The station stood vacant until the City of Plano renovated it into the Interurban Railway Museum in 1990. The building was added to the National Register of Historic Places on August 10, 2005. The museum also displays Car 360, a restored railcar of the Texas Electric Railway, on the grounds.

== Management ==
The Plano Conservancy for Historic Preservation, Inc. has managed the Interurban Railway Museum since 2001 in partnership with the City of Plano. In an agreement with the City of Plano, the Plano Conservancy was allowed to operate the Museum in exchange for office space. During the first year of operation, the Plano Conservancy established enough credibility to receive funding under the hotel/motel tax provisions of the City of Plano.

Preceding station	Texas Electric Railway	Following station
Allen toward Denison	Dallas - Denison	Richardson toward Dallas

== Gallery ==
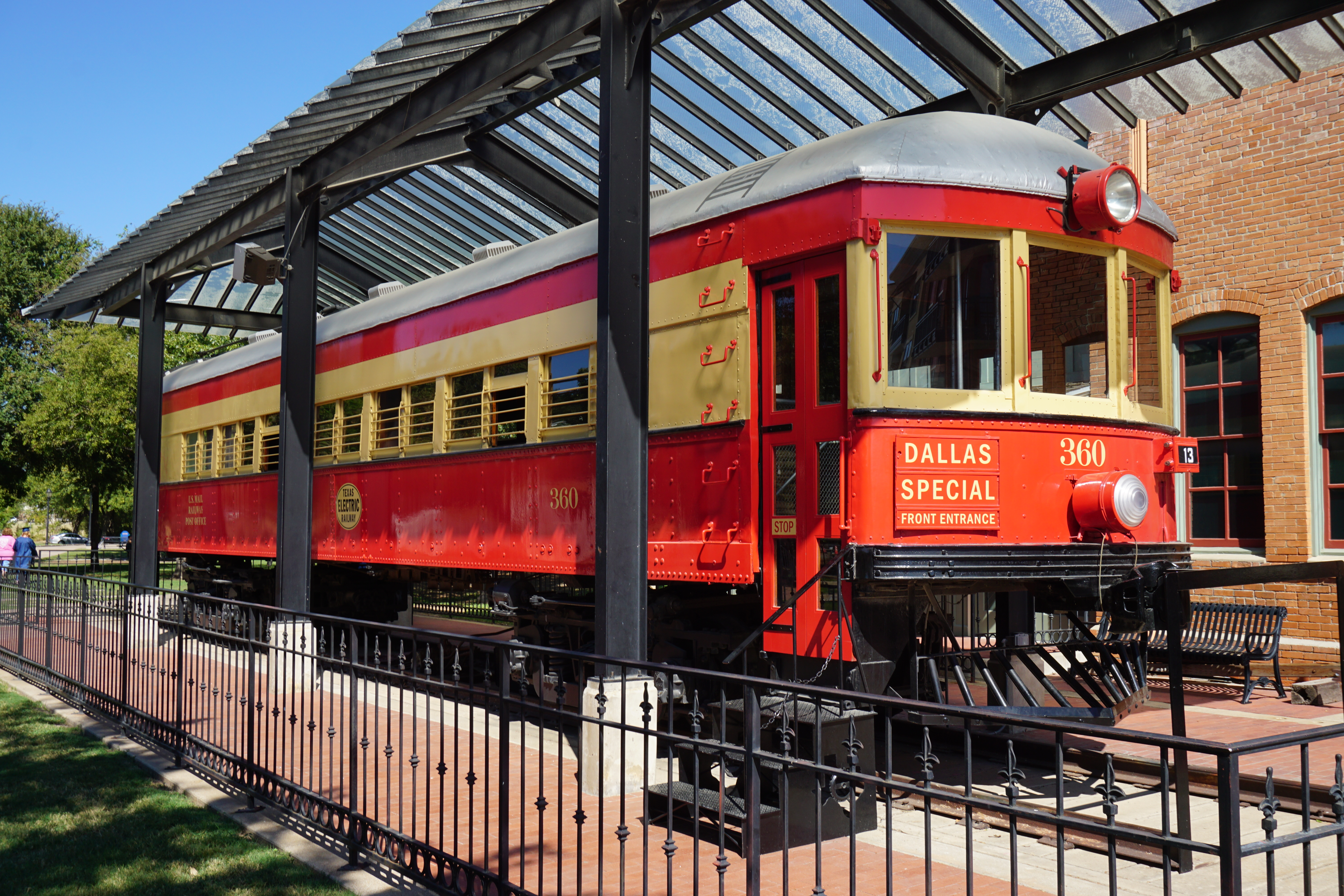
Texas Electric Railway Car 360 on display outside the museum

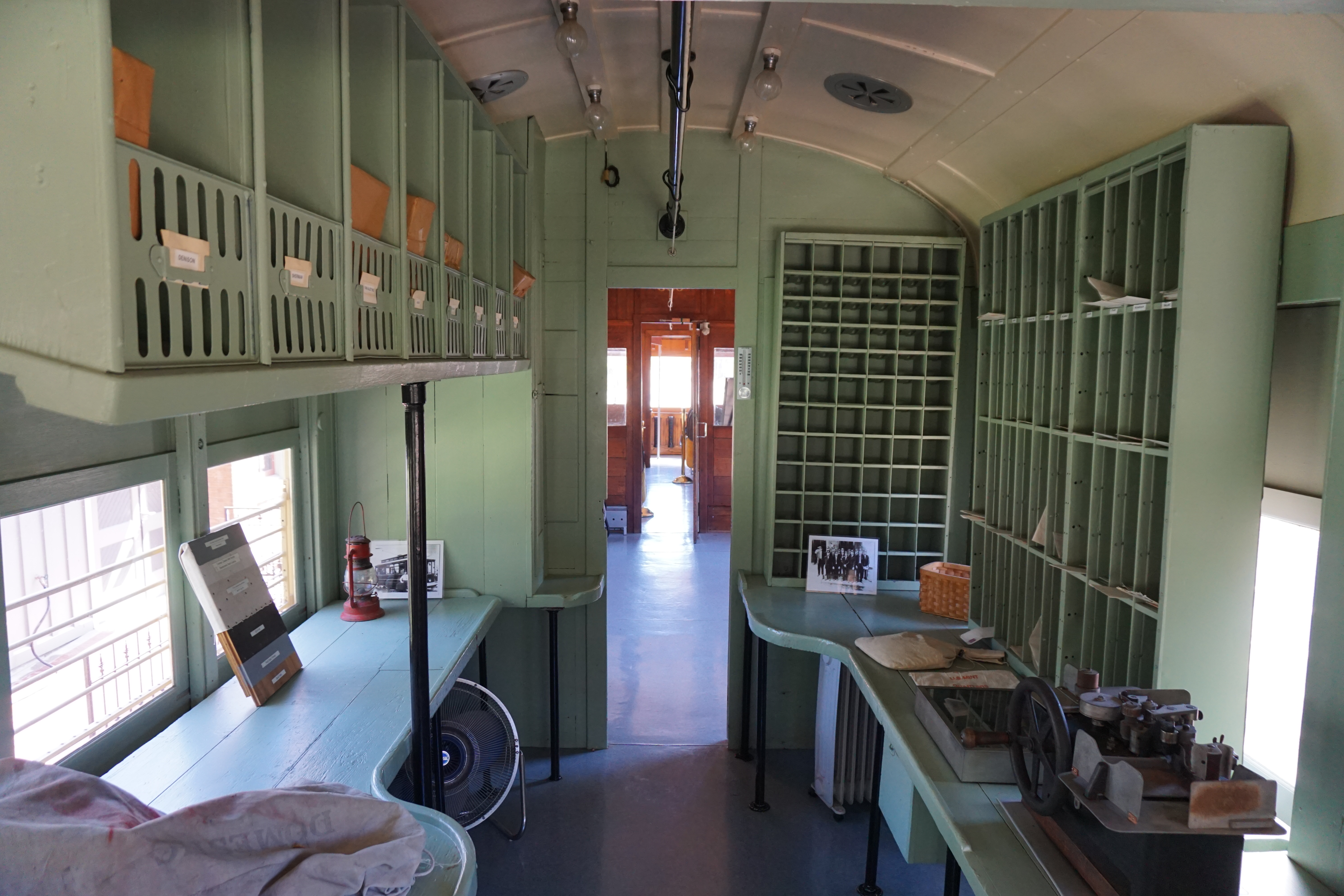
Interior of the railway post office section of Car 360

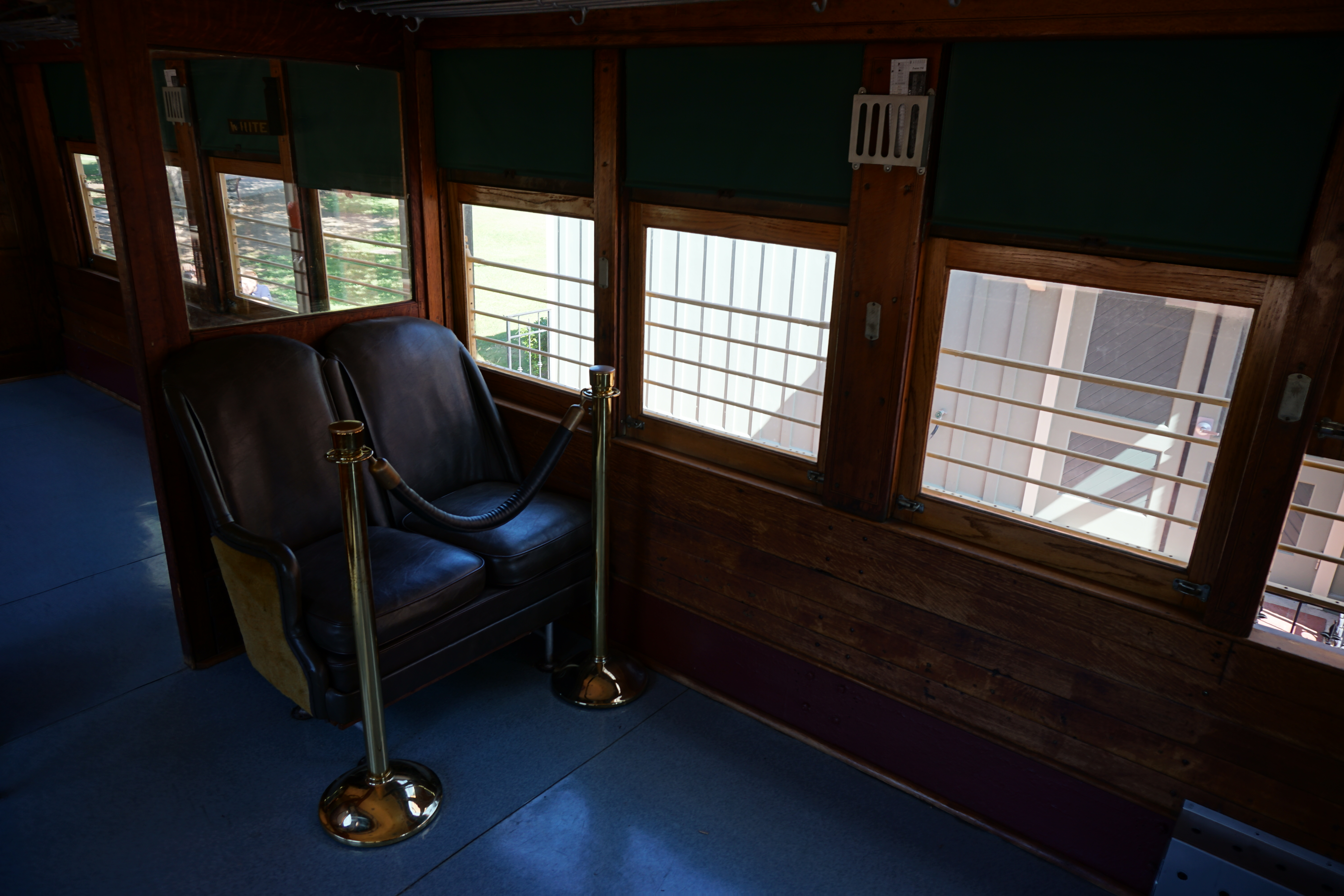
Interior of the passenger section of Car 360

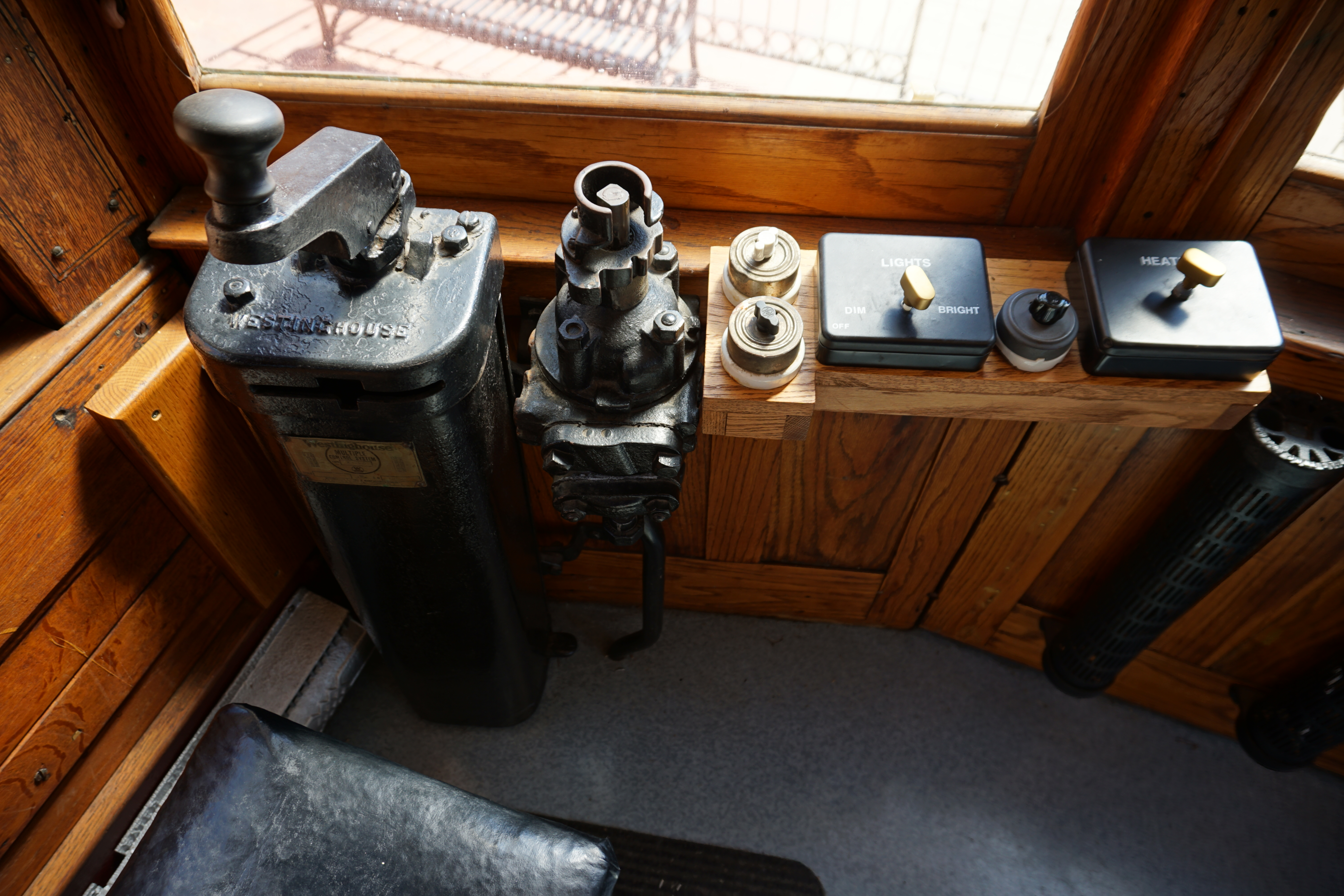
Driver controls of Car 360

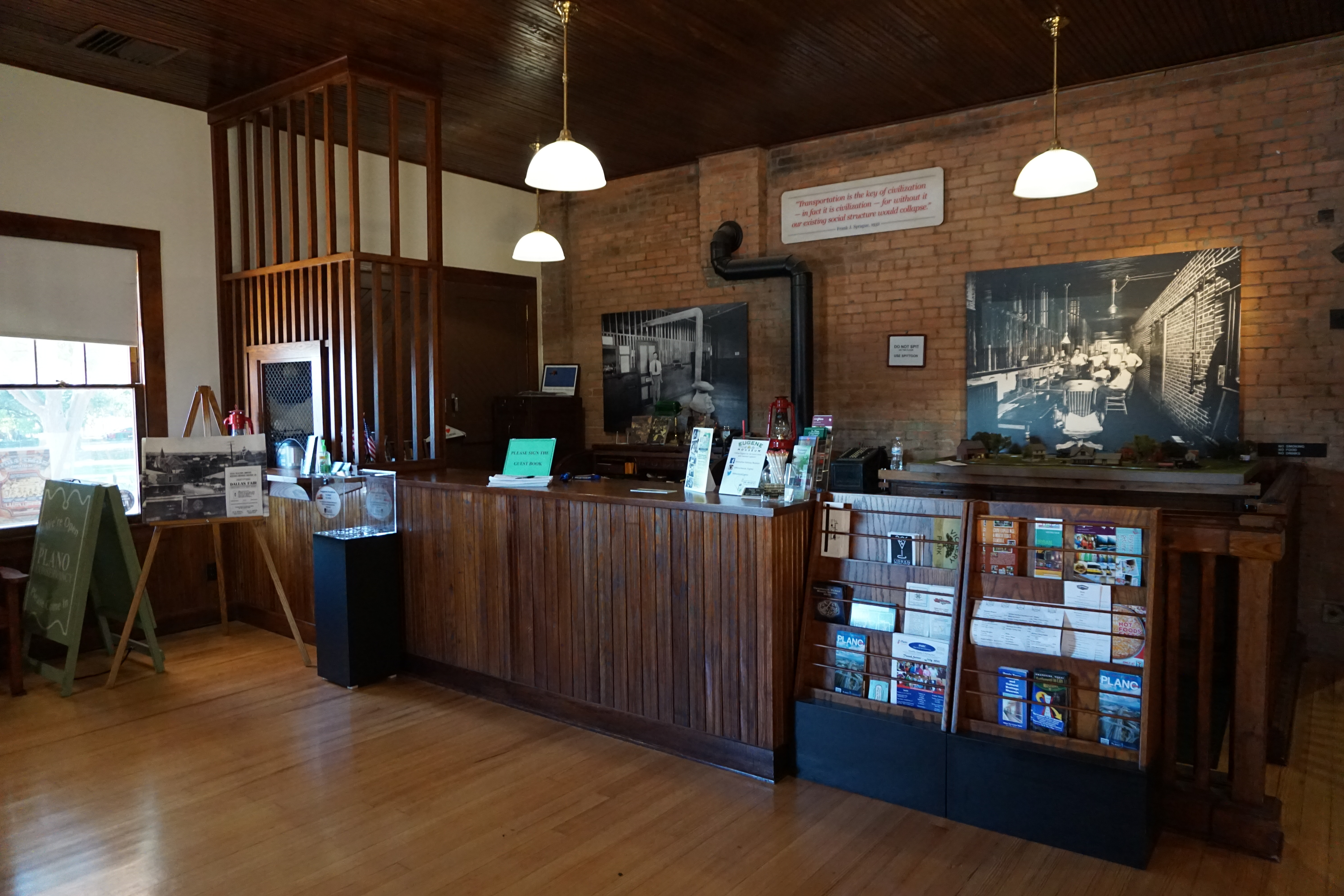
Museum interior

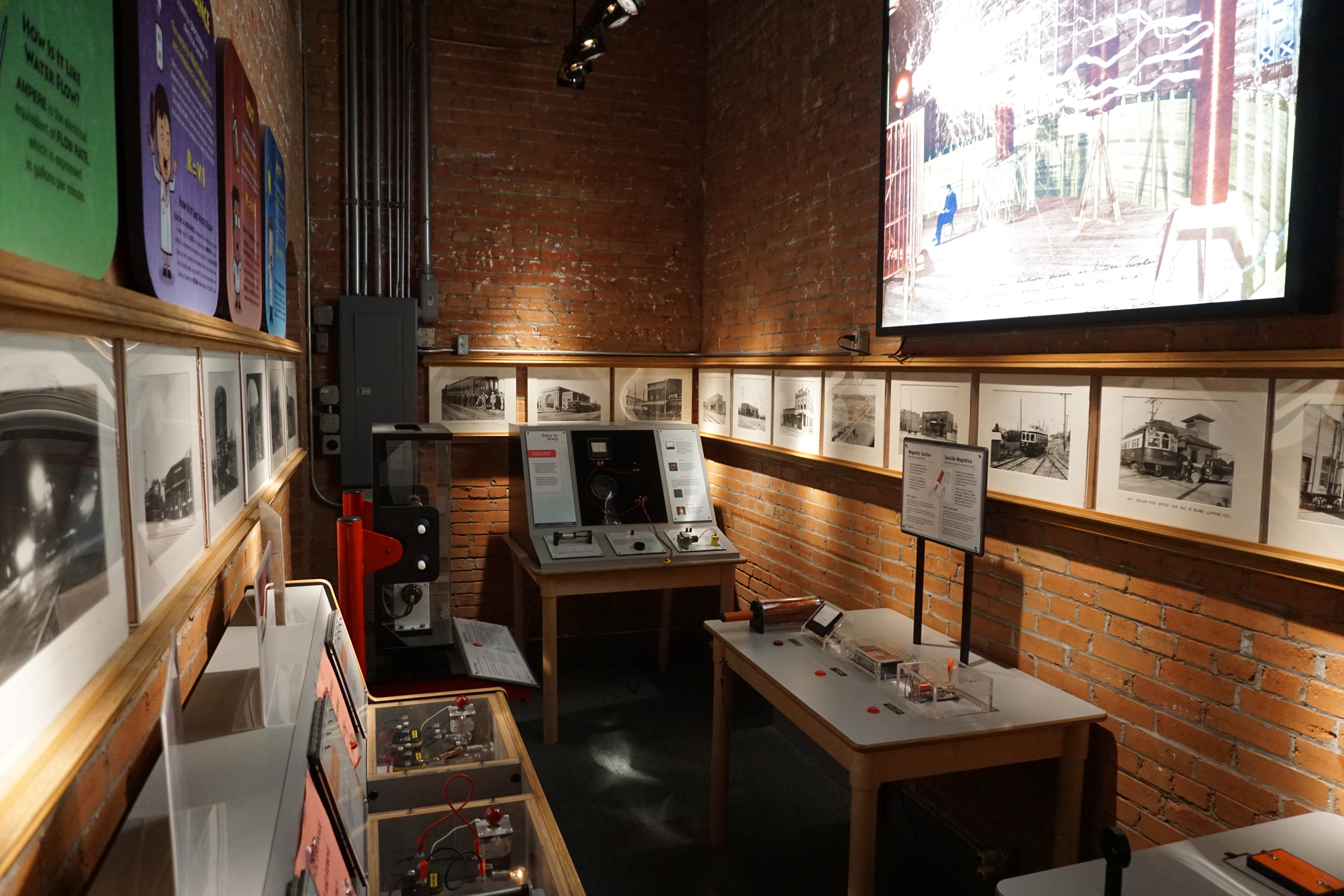
Museum interior exhibits

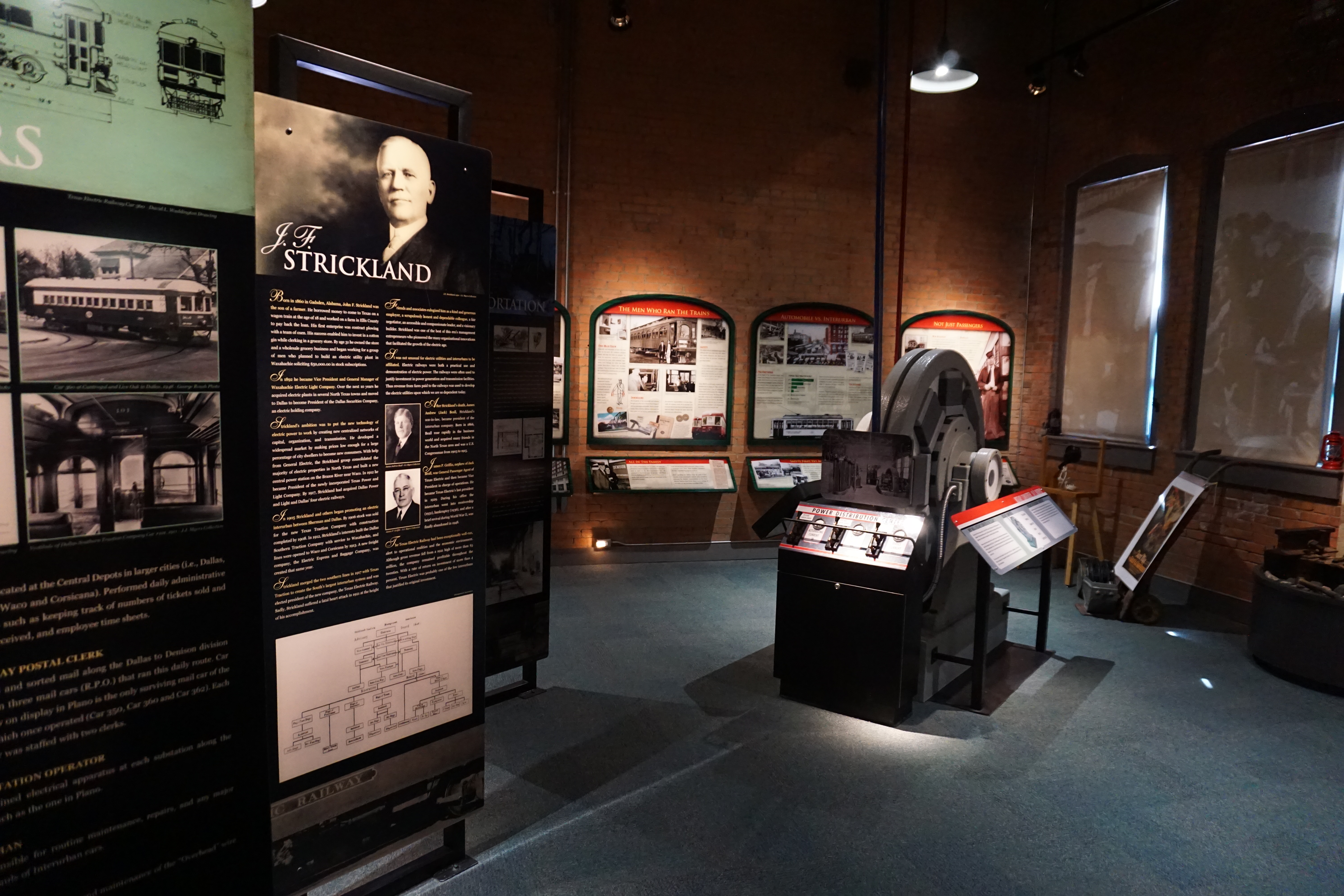
Museum interior exhibits

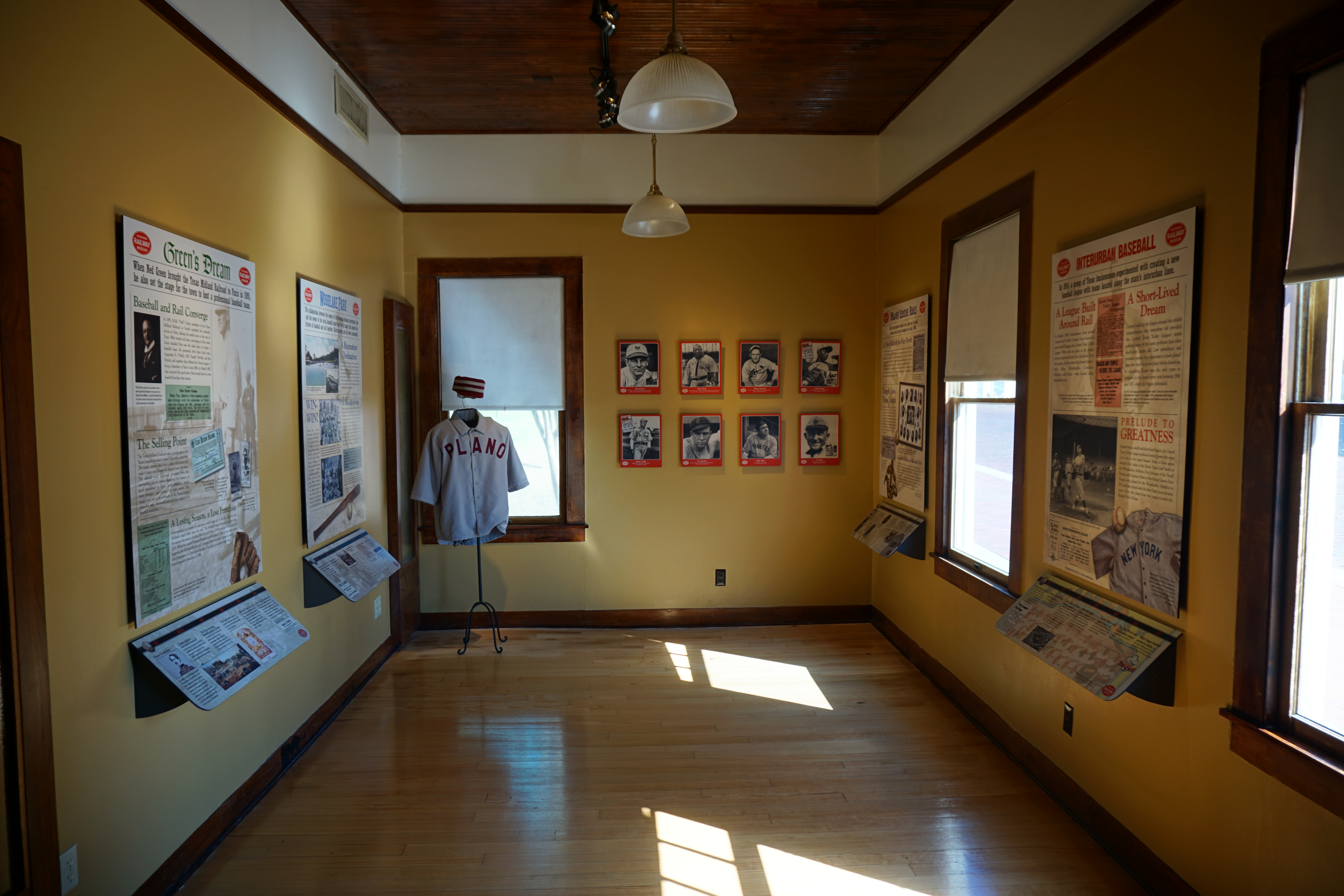
Home Runs & Heartaches baseball exhibit

== See also ==
- National Register of Historic Places listings in Collin County, Texas
- Recorded Texas Historic Landmarks in Collin County
