= Texas Electric Railway =

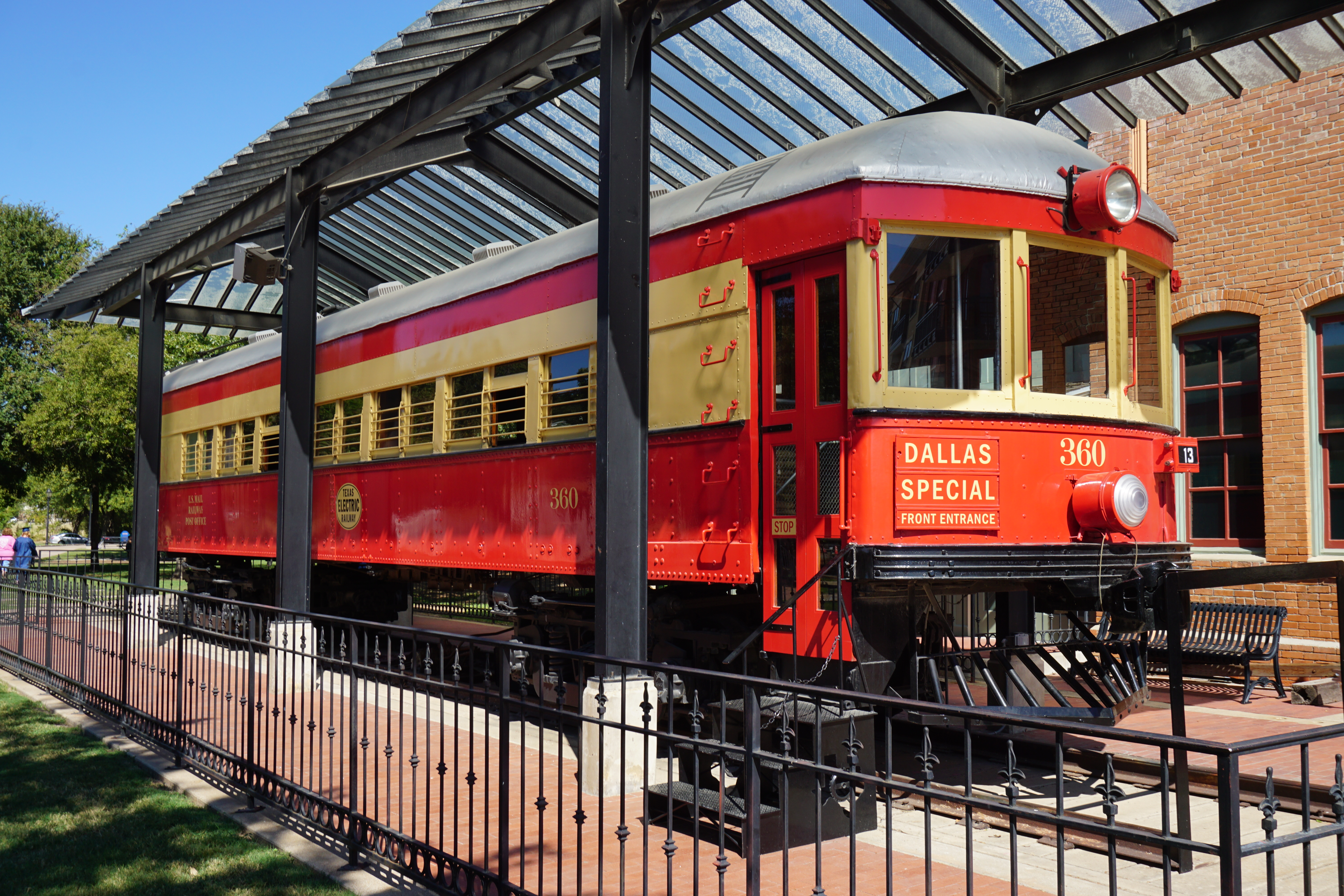
- Restored rail car at the Interurban Railway Museum

Overview
- Status: Defunct
- Locale: Dallas, Texas

Service
- Type: Interurban
- Services: 3

History
- Opened: 1908
- Closed: 1948

Technical
- Track gauge: 4 ft 8 1/2 in (1,435 mm) standard gauge
- Electrification: Trolley wire

The Texas Electric Railway was a historic interurban railroad that operated from Dallas, Texas, to Denison, Corsicana, and Waco. It began operation in 1908 and through the merger of several companies became the largest interurban railway operator in the South before its demise in 1948.

== History ==
In 1901, the Denison and Sherman Railway, connecting the towns of Denison and Sherman with 10 miles (16 km) of track, opened as the first interurban rail line in Texas. This line was purchased in 1911 by the Texas Traction Company, which had constructed a 65-mile (105 km) line of their own from Dallas to Sherman and began operation in 1908. While not connected to Sherman yet, shortly after, Dallas and Fort Worth built an interurban connecting the two cities. Seeing a need to expand in other directions, the owners of the Texas Traction Company purchased the Dallas Southern Traction Company, a 28-mile (45 km) line from Dallas to Waxahachie in 1912. The merged company became known as the Southern Traction Company and the rail line was extended to Waco in 1913. A separate 56-mile (90 km) line from Dallas to Corsicana was also completed. In 1917 the Texas Traction Company and the Southern Traction Company merged to form the Texas Electric Railway Company and became the largest interurban railway in the South with more than 200 miles (320 km) of track. The interurban became a vital link for communities until the increasing usage of the automobile caused a decline in revenue. The Dallas-Corsicana branch was discontinued in 1941 and the Dallas-Waco and Dallas-Denison branches closed in 1948.

Throughout these years, interurban was a lifeline shipping farm products. Mail was sorted inside the interurban railway post office.

== Today ==
The central train station in Dallas was converted into the Interurban Building Apartments. The former train yard of this station is now the apartment's parking complex.

Today several pieces of infrastructure still remain. The Dallas Area Rapid Transit light rail system utilizes the right-of-way of the Texas Electric Railway for several parts of its lines, including the Red Line.

The wood frame passenger depot in downtown Plano and its attached brick electric transformer section remained in use until December 31, 1948. The Plano Station building now hosts the Interurban Railway Museum where a restored Texas Electric Railway car may be seen, and is listed in the National Register of Historic Places.

The Monroe Shops (1914), once the maintenance facility for Texas Electric's vehicles, was restored in 2011 and now serves as headquarters to the DART Police Department.

The Dallas Interurban Building (1916), once serving as the main Dallas depot, now houses residents and retail.

The Texas Electric Railway Allen Station still stands at 105 South Butler Drive.

== Bibliography ==
- Myers, J.J. and L.O. King. 1982. Texas Electric Railway. Central Electric Railfans Association. Library of Congress Catalog Card #82-71474.
- Varney, R. Texas Electric Album. Interurbans Special #62. ISBN 0-916374-01-7.
