= CCCA =

CCCA be an abbreviation for:

- Canadian Collegiate Athletic Association
- Central centrifugal cicatricial alopecia
- Classic Car Club of America
- correlation consistent Composite Approach
- Canyon Creek Christian Academy
- Comprehensive Crime Control Act of 1984
