= Lipedematous alopecia =

- Other names: Lipedematous scalp
- Specialty: Dermatology

Lipedematous alopecia is a disorder characterized by a thick boggy scalp and hair loss. Symptoms include pain, puritis, headaches, and paresthesia. The cause of lipedematous alopecia is unknown. The diagnosis is made by excluding other disorders, MRI, CT scan, and histopathology. There is no accepted treatment however surgical debulking has been found effective.

== Signs and symptoms ==
Typically, vertex and occipital regions are where scalp thickening is first observed, and it gradually spreads to the entire scalp. Like a balloon, the lesions can be pushed down to the underlying bone, yet they promptly revert to their original shape. It has been reported that accompanying symptoms include pruritis, discomfort, headaches, and paresthesia.

== Causes ==
As of right now, there is no solid evidence connecting lipedematous alopecia to other symptoms or genetic abnormalities. Medical issues including skin and joint hyperelasticity, kidney failure, scalp psoriasis, and breast cancer have been recorded in cases of lipedematous alopecia. Nevertheless, there is no evidence linking lipedematous alopecia to these illnesses; instead, these conditions appear to be coincidental.

== Mechanism ==
It has been suggested that leptin, a hormone that controls the distribution of adipose tissue, contributes to subcutaneous fat hyperplasia. Adipose tissue displacement and metaplasia are key components of a different explanation of lipedematous alopecia pathophysiology. Hormones may also be involved because women make up the majority of lipedematous alopecia patients; however, there is not enough data to explain why this phenomenon is seen.

== Diagnosis ==
In order to diagnose lipedematous alopecia, one must evaluate the clinical appearance and rule out illnesses such as cutis verticis gyrata.

A thicker layer of subcutaneous fat with varying disturbance of fatty architecture, the lack of inflammation, normal hair follicles and adnexa, and no apparent lipoma or panniculitis are among the histomorphologic characteristics of lipedematous alopecia. Histopathology, magnetic resonance imaging, and computed tomography scans are examples of diagnostic modalities. Histology typically reveals hyperplasia of the subcutaneous adipose tissue in addition to normal epidermis and dermis.

== Treatment ==
There is little to no treatment for lipedematous alopecia that can stop or slow progression. There have been unsuccessful attempts at treating the condition with hydroxychloroquine and topical and intralesional steroids. After a year, surgical debulking with scalp reduction shows no signs of recurrence, a satisfactory outcome.

== See also ==
- Hot comb alopecia
- List of cutaneous conditions
