= Richardson, Texas =

City in the Dallas and Collin counties of Texas, United States

- City
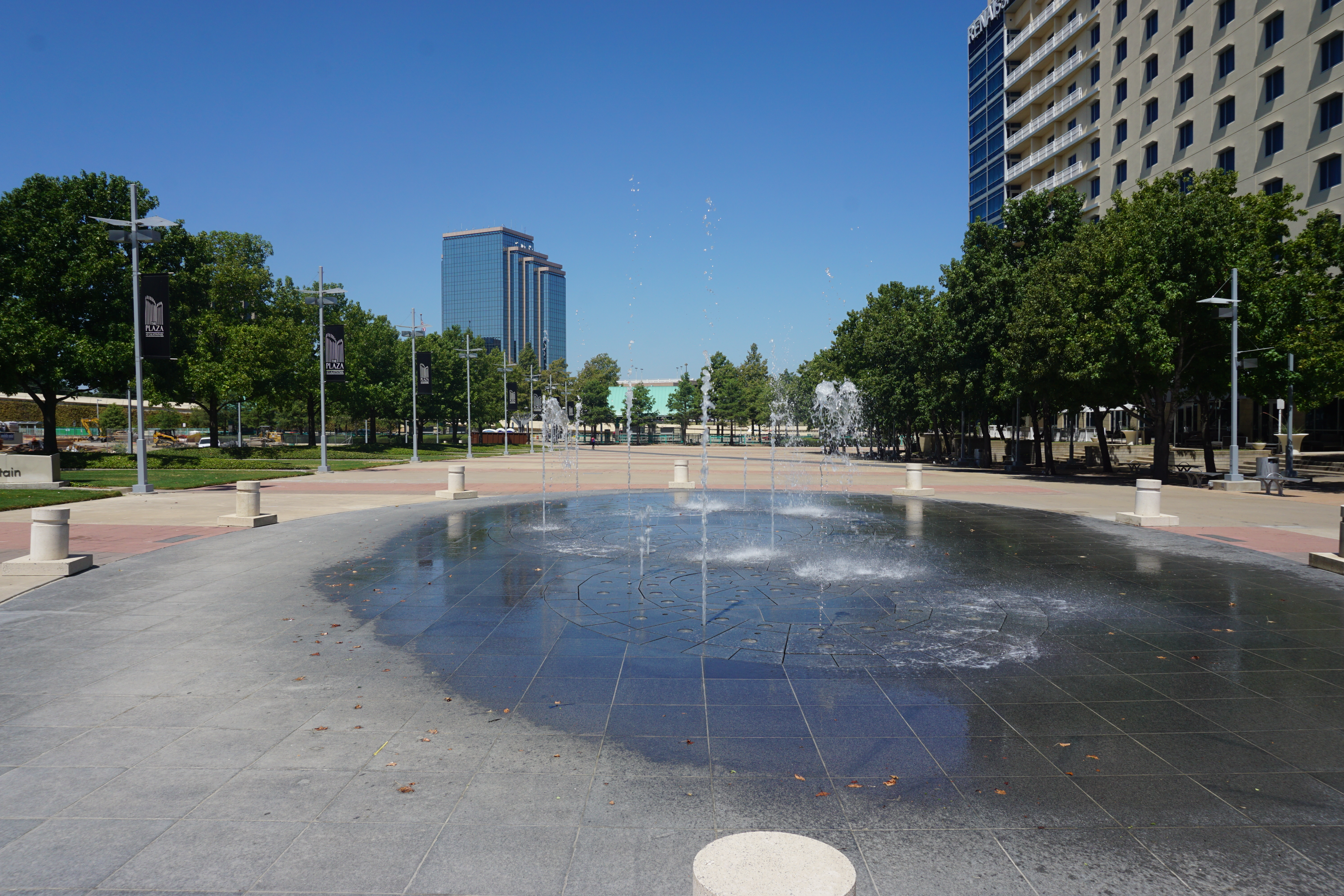
- A plaza near Galatyn Park station in 2019

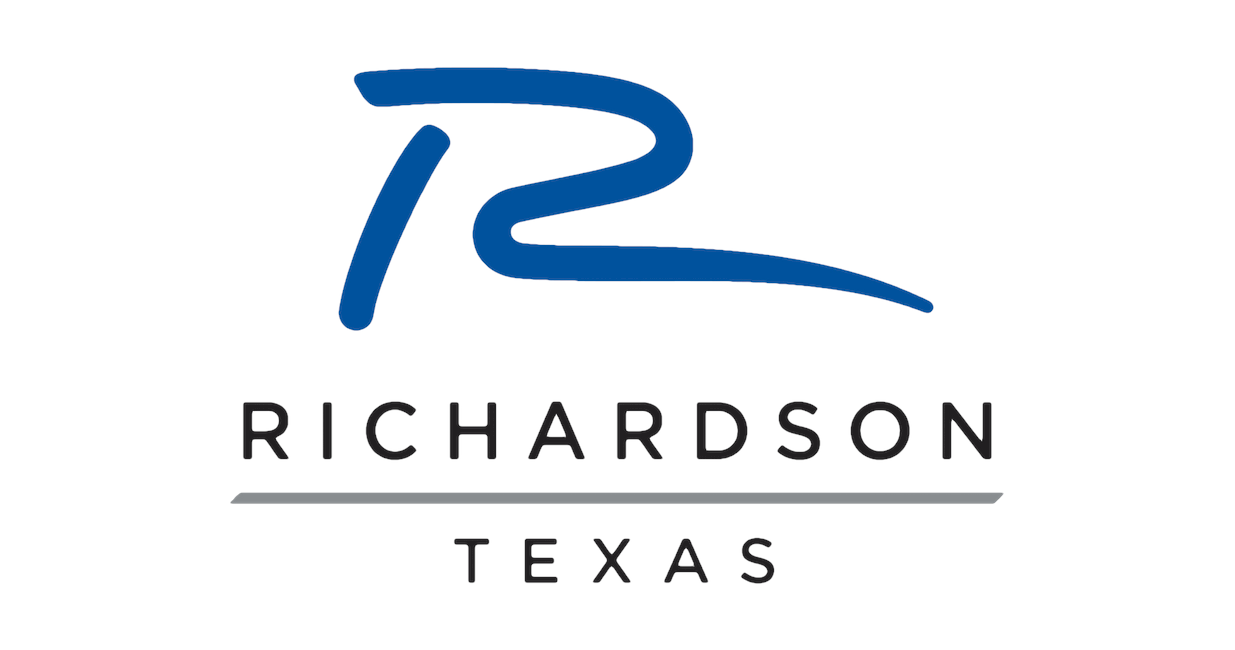
- Flag Seal
- Nickname: "The Telecom Corridor"
- Location within Dallas County and Texas

- Location within Texas Location within the United States
- Coordinates: 32°56′54″N 96°43′47″W
- Country: United States
- State: Texas
- Counties: Dallas and Collin

Government
  - Type: Council–manager
  - City council: Mayor Amir Omar; Arefin Shamsul; Curtis Dorian; Jennifer Justice; Dan Barrios; Joe Corcoran; Ken Hutchenrider
  - City manager: Don Magner

Area
  - Total: 28.66 sq mi (74.22 km^{2})
  - Land: 28.57 sq mi (73.99 km^{2})
  - Water: 0.089 sq mi (0.23 km^{2})
- Elevation: 633 ft (193 m)

Population (2020)
  - Total: 119,469
  - Rank: US: 240th
  - Density: 4,169.0/sq mi (1,609.66/km^{2})
- Time zone: UTC−6 (CST)
  - Summer (DST): UTC−5 (CDT)
- ZIP codes: 75080–75083, 75085
- Area codes: 214, 469, 945, 972
- FIPS code: 48-61796
- GNIS feature ID: 2410933
- Website: cor.net

Richardson is a city in Dallas and Collin counties in the U.S. state of Texas. As of the 2020 United States census, the city had a total population of 119,469. Richardson is an inner suburb of the city of Dallas.

It is home to the University of Texas at Dallas and the Telecom Corridor, with a high concentration of telecommunications companies. More than 5,000 businesses have operations within Richardson's 28 square miles (73 km^{2}), including many of the world's largest telecommunications and networking companies, such as AT&T, Verizon, Cisco Systems, Samsung, ZTE, MetroPCS, Texas Instruments, Qorvo, and Fujitsu. Richardson's largest employment base is provided by the insurance industry, with Blue Cross and Blue Shield of Texas's headquarters, a regional hub for the insurance company GEICO, regional offices for UnitedHealth Group#UnitedHealthcare, and one of State Farm Insurance's three national regional hubs located in the community.

== History ==
Emigrants from Kentucky and Tennessee settled near present-day Richardson in the 1840s. Before the Civil War, a small settlement called Breckenridge, located near present-day Richland College, was established. In 1873, the Houston and Texas Central Railway built a depot northwest of Breckenridge. After the H.&T.C. purchased acreage for a townsite from two local land-owners, the site was surveyed and laid out in blocks and lots, which the railroad began selling in 1874. The town was named after the secretary of the Houston & Texas Central Railroad, Alfred S. Richardson.

In 1908, the Texas Electric Railway, an electric railway known as the Interurban, connected Richardson to Denison, Waco, Corsicana and Dallas. In 1910 the population was approximately 600. A red brick schoolhouse was built in 1914 and is now the administrative office for the Richardson Independent School District. In 1924 the Red Brick Road, the present-day Greenville Avenue, was completed. The completion of the road brought increased traffic, population and property values. The town incorporated and elected a mayor in 1925. In 1940 the population was approximately 740.

After World War II the city experienced major increases in population, which stood at approximately 1,300 by 1950. Throughout the 1950s the city continued to see growth including the opening of the Collins Radio Richardson office, Central Expressway, a police department, shopping centers, and many homes. Texas Instruments opened its offices in Dallas on the southern border of Richardson in 1956. This was followed by significant gains in land values, population, and economic status. In the 1960s Richardson experienced additional growth including several new parks, facilities, and the creation of the University of Texas at Dallas within the city limits. By 1972 the population was approximately 56,000. Residential growth continued through the 1970s and slowed in the 1980s. Commercial development increased throughout the 1980s. Richardson had a population of 74,840 according to the 1990 census. Population increases throughout the 1990s were primarily from development of the northeast part of the city. The city of Buckingham, after being completely surrounded by Richardson, was annexed into the city in 1996.

Richardson had a population of 91,802 as of the 2000 census. By 2002 Richardson had four Dallas Area Rapid Transit (DART) light rail stations and had built the Eisemann Center for Performing Arts and Corporate Presentations and the adjacent Galatyn Park urban center, which has a 2-acre public pedestrian plaza, a luxury hotel, and mixed-use development. Richardson was a "dry city" with no alcohol sales until November 2006, when the local option election passed to allow the sale of beer and wine in grocery and convenience stores. In the fall of 2008 Peter Perfect, a Style Network television show, came to Richardson. The business-makeover show remodeled SpiritWear, an apparel and embroidery store in the city's historic downtown area. The episode first aired on January 22, 2009. It was the first episode of the series to be filmed outside of California.

== Geography ==
The cities of Dallas, Plano and Garland constitute almost all of the Richardson border apart from the municipality's extreme northeastern "panhandle."

Richardson borders the Lake Highlands area of northeast Dallas to the south, North Dallas to the southwest, Far North Dallas to the west, West Plano to the northwest, East Plano to the north, the city of Murphy to the northeast, Sachse to the east, and Garland to the southeast.

According to the United States Census Bureau, the city has a total area of 28.6 square miles (74.2 km^{2}), of which 28.6 square miles (74.0 km^{2}) is land and 0.08 square miles (0.2 km^{2}), or 0.32%, is water.

Approximately two-thirds of the city is in Dallas County, with the northern third of the city in Collin County. Of the 28.6 square miles (74.2 km^{2}) contained within the borders of the city of Richardson, 18.2 square miles (47 km^{2}) lie in Dallas County; the other 9.2 square miles (24 km^{2}) are in Collin County.

=== Climate ===
The climate in this area is characterized by hot, humid summers and generally mild to cool winters. According to the Köppen Climate Classification system, Richardson has a humid subtropical climate, abbreviated "Cfa" on climate maps.

== Demographics ==
Historical population
Census	Pop.	Note	%±
1930	629		—
1940	720		14.5%
1950	1,289		79.0%
1960	16,810		1,204.1%
1970	48,405		188.0%
1980	72,496		49.8%
1990	74,840		3.2%
2000	91,802		22.7%
2010	99,223		8.1%
2020	119,469		20.4%
U.S. Decennial Census

=== Racial and ethnic composition ===
Richardson city, Texas – racial and ethnic composition Note: the US Census treats Hispanic/Latino as an ethnic category. This table excludes Latinos from the racial categories and assigns them to a separate category. Hispanics/Latinos may be of any race.
Race / ethnicity (NH = Non-Hispanic)	Pop 2000	Pop 2010	Pop 2020	% 2000	% 2010	% 2020
White alone (NH)	63,850	57,600	60,286	69.55%	58.05%	50.46%
Black or African American alone (NH)	5,586	8,283	12,615	6.08%	8.35%	10.56%
Native American or Alaska Native alone (NH)	311	318	318	0.34%	0.32%	0.27%
Asian alone (NH)	10,666	14,929	20,412	11.62%	15.05%	17.09%
Pacific Islander alone (NH)	41	42	55	0.04%	0.04%	0.05%
Some Other Race alone (NH)	120	201	535	0.13%	0.20%	0.45%
Mixed-race or multiracial (NH)	1,808	2,001	4,720	1.97%	2.02%	3.95%
Hispanic or Latino (any race)	9,420	15,849	20,528	10.26%	15.97%	17.18%
Total	91,802	99,223	119,469	100.00%	100.00%	100.00%

=== 2020 census ===
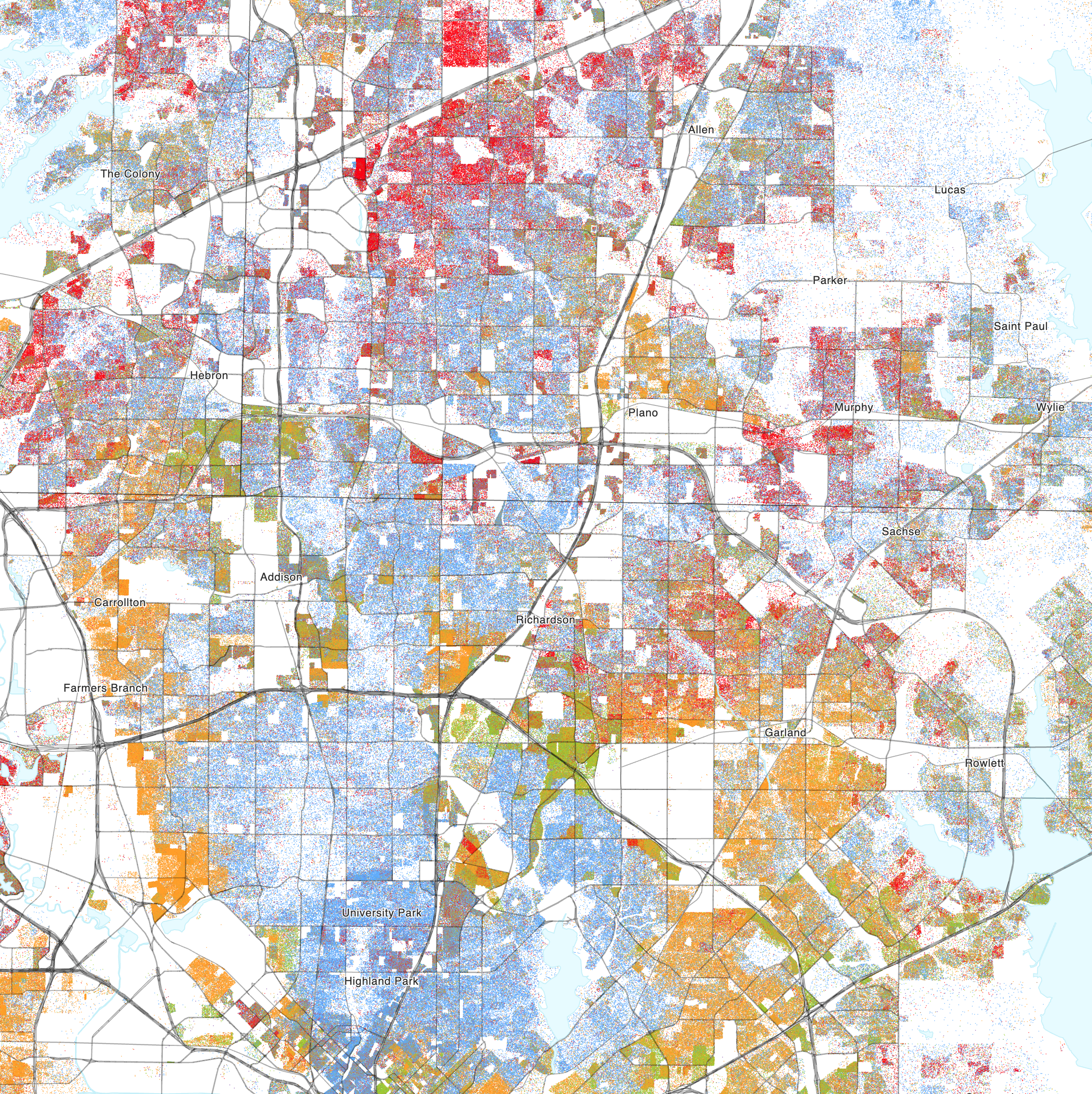
Map of racial distribution in Richardson, 2020 U.S. census. Each dot is one person: ⬤ White ⬤ Black ⬤ Asian ⬤ Hispanic ⬤ Multiracial ⬤ Native American/other

As of the 2020 census, Richardson had a population of 119,469, 29,113 families, and 45,812 households residing in the city, and the median age was 34.1 years. 19.8% of residents were under the age of 18 and 14.0% of residents were 65 years of age or older; for every 100 females there were 98.8 males, and for every 100 females age 18 and over there were 97.9 males age 18 and over.

100.0% of residents lived in urban areas, while 0.0% lived in rural areas.

There were 45,812 households in Richardson, of which 28.7% had children under the age of 18 living in them. Of all households, 47.1% were married-couple households, 20.3% were households with a male householder and no spouse or partner present, and 27.4% were households with a female householder and no spouse or partner present. About 29.3% of all households were made up of individuals and 8.9% had someone living alone who was 65 years of age or older.

There were 49,267 housing units, of which 7.0% were vacant. The homeowner vacancy rate was 1.0% and the rental vacancy rate was 9.1%.

Racial composition as of the 2020 census
Race	Number	Percent
White	64,783	54.2%
Black or African American	12,829	10.7%
American Indian and Alaska Native	663	0.6%
Asian	20,502	17.2%
Native Hawaiian and Other Pacific Islander	68	0.1%
Some other race	7,510	6.3%
Two or more races	13,114	11.0%
Hispanic or Latino (of any race)	20,528	17.2%

=== 2010 census ===
As of the 2010 census, the population density was 3,213.9 people per square mile (1,241.1/km^{2}). There were 36,530 housing units at an average density of 1,278.9 per square mile (493.8/km^{2}).

In the city, 21.9% of the population was under the age of 18, 10.5% was from 18 to 24, 28.2% from 25 to 44, 25.8% from 45 to 64, and 13.6% was 65 years of age or older. The median age was 37.2 years. For every 100 females, there were 99.7 males.

In the 2015 American Community Survey 5-year Estimates males had a median income of $60,709 versus $50,404 for females. The per capita income for the city was $29,551. About 5.7% of families and 10.6% of the population were below the poverty line, including 11.7% of those under age 18 and 4.3% of those age 65 or over. According to a 2015 estimate, the median income for a family in Richardson was $72,427 and a median home price of $198,900.

=== Race and ethnicity ===
By 1990, 10% of the Richardson population had not been born in the United States, which increased to 18.1% by 2000. According to the 2015 American Community Survey 5-year Estimates, this figure was 24.3%. As of 2015, of those not born in the United States, almost 50% had arrived in the United States after 2000.

Dallas County has an estimated 275,000 Arab Americans, many of whom have settled in Richardson. Many of them have come from Egypt, Iraq, Syria, Palestine, Jordan, Yemen, Morocco, etc. The DFW Chinatown is located in Richardson, in part because of the large Asian population. Esther Wu, a former editor of the Dallas Morning News, stated that Chinese immigration began in Richardson in 1975. Since then the Chinese community has expanded to the north. In the mid-1980s the majority of ethnic Chinese K–12 students in the DFW area resided in Richardson.

By 2012 North Texas had over 60 Chinese cultural organizations and most of them were headquartered in Richardson and Plano. The Dallas Chinese Community Center (DCCC; Chinese: 达拉斯华人活动中心; pinyin: Dálāsī Huárén Huódòngzhōngxīn) is in the DFW Chinatown. It includes English as a second language (ESL) classes and 20,000 books written in Simplified Chinese; the center imported some books from People's Republic of Mainland China. As of 2011 the Chinese restaurants catering to ethnic Chinese in DFW are mainly in Richardson and Plano. The University of Texas at Dallas in Richardson, as of 2012, has almost 1,000 Chinese students. The university has a program to recruit students of Chinese origin.

Richardson's Indian immigrant community has been primarily driven by the international telecommunications industry that is so prevalent in the community. The Indian Association of North Texas headquarters are in Richardson. Indo-Pak grocery store is located in an Indian-oriented strip shopping center east of Central Expressway. Of the suburbs in the DFW area, Richardson had one of the earliest Indian settlements.

Richardson is home to a large community of Vietnamese Americans and even has a significant amount of Vietnamese-catering retail stores, malls, markets, and plazas, especially near U.S. 75, such as the Cali Saigon Shopping Mall - which borders Dallas and Garland respectively.

== Economy ==
Despite declining economies in other parts of the United States, from 2005 to 2009 Richardson enjoyed substantial increases in economic growth, with the city's total assessed property value rising from $8.3 billion in 2005 to $14 billion in 2017. Additionally, sales tax collection increased from $21 million in 2005 to an estimated $32.9 million in 2017.

Since 2008, both Standard & Poor's and Moody's have upgraded Richardson's credit rating to "AAA" from the previous rating of "AA+". At the time, Richardson was one of only four cities in the state of Texas and one of 88 cities in the nation with an "AAA" rating from Standard & Poor's. In 2015, the North Central Texas Council of Governments (NCTCOG) determined Richardson's daytime population to be 156,065 based on American Community Survey information. The economy remains rooted in the telecommunication industry. However, Richardson's property tax base is deep and extends beyond its telecommunication roots to include other sectors including insurance, health care, technology and finance. The tax base is diverse with the 10 leading taxpayers accounting for 16.17% of total assessed value.

On March 1, 2014, the Richardson Fire Department officially received its Class 1 ISO rating. The Insurance Services Office (ISO) is "a leading supplier of statistical, underwriting and actuarial information for the property/casualty insurance industry", and its rating is used to measure the quality and effectiveness of fire protection in a community. At the time, Richardson was one of only 56 municipalities in the country to achieve this highest rating, which tends to reduce property/casualty insurance premiums.

=== Corporate headquarters ===
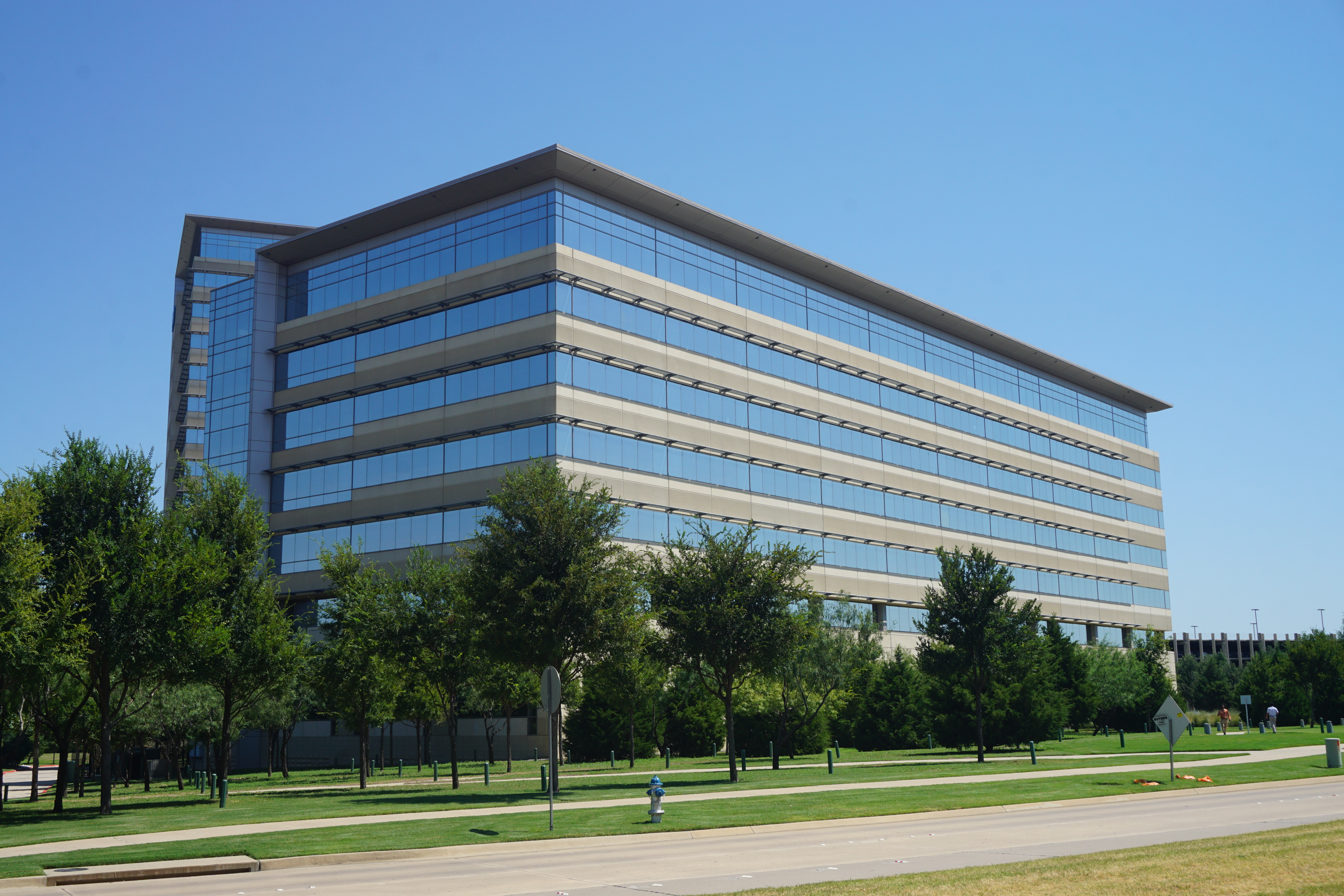
Blue Cross and Blue Shield of Texas

Metro by T-Mobile, Fossil Group, Lennox International, Vent-A-Hood, id Software, VCE, BlueCross BlueShield of Texas, RealPage, Fujitsu Network Communications (U.S. Headquarters) and Samsung Mobile have their corporate headquarters in Richardson.

=== Major employers ===
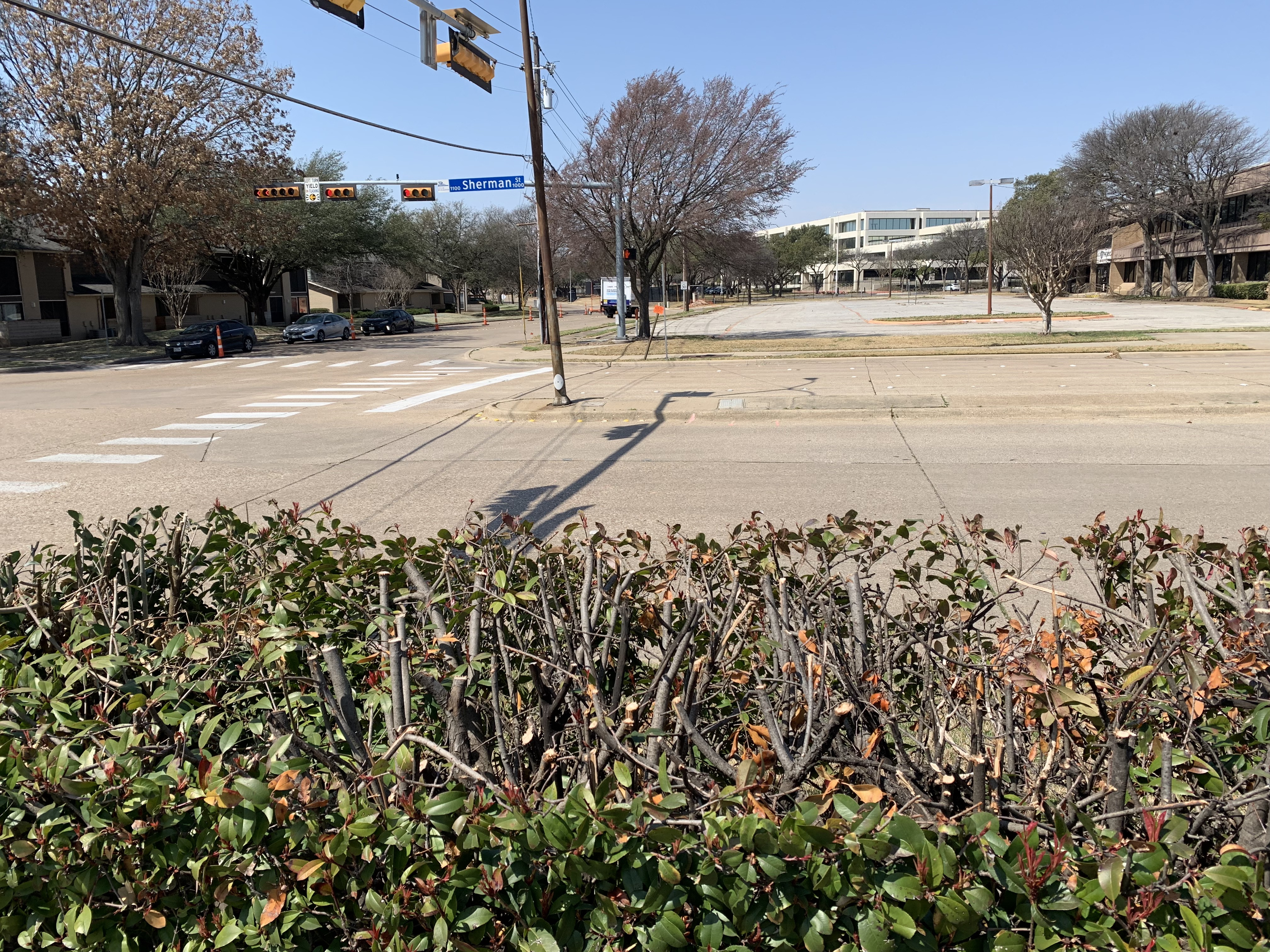
Fossil Group headquarters (in the background)

According to the Richardson Economic Development Partnership's listing on Major Employers (last updated May 2018), the top employers in the city were:

#	Employer	# of employees
1	State Farm Insurance	8,000
2	AT&T Inc.	5,000
3	Blue Cross and Blue Shield of Texas	3,100
4	The University of Texas at Dallas	2,674
5	Richardson Independent School District	2,500
6	RealPage	2,100
7	GEICO	1,800
8	UnitedHealth Group#UnitedHealthcare	1,700
9	Raytheon	1,700
10	Fujitsu Network Communications	1,500

== Arts and culture ==
The Charles W. Eisemann Center for Performing Arts is located in Richardson. It serves as the primary venue for the Richardson Symphony Orchestra and the Plano Symphony Orchestra.

== Government ==
Richardson was originally incorporated in 1925, with the first charter being adopted in 1956 and the latest revision made in November 2015. The community is a home rule city and has operated under the council–manager form of government since 1956. Richardson voters simultaneously elect six Council members and a mayor to represent them every two years. The council members representing the four districts (1 to 4) must live in each district, respectively; however, the mayor and the remaining two districts (5 and 6) can live in any part of the city. All council members and the mayor are elected at large, with four Council members representing each of the city's four districts. The city council is elected for two-year terms on a nonpartisan basis.

The Charter requires that the city council appoint a city manager to act as the chief administrative and executive officer. The city manager is not appointed for a fixed time and may be removed at the will and pleasure of the majority of the city council. One of the responsibilities of the city manager is to appoint and remove department heads and conduct the general affairs of the municipal government in accordance with the policies of the city council.

The city provides to its citizens a full range of services including police and fire protection, emergency ambulance service, water and sewer service, solid waste disposal, park and recreational activities, cultural events, and a library. In addition, the city provides planning for future land use, traffic control, building inspection, and community services and operates two 18-hole golf courses. The city also operates the Charles W. Eisemann Center for Performing Arts and Corporate Presentations, which is a multi-venue performing arts and presentation center.

The City of Richardson is a voluntary member of the North Central Texas Council of Governments (NCTCOG) association, the purpose of which is to coordinate individual and collective local governments and facilitate regional solutions, eliminate unnecessary duplication, and enable joint decisions.

=== Politics ===
Richardson city vote by party in presidential elections
Year	Democratic	Republican	Third parties
2020	57.26% 30,621	40.84% 21,840	1.90% 1,016
2016	48.20% 20,379	46.39% 19,614	5.41% 2,287
2012	40.07% 15,969	58.04% 23,131	1.89% 753

Richardson city vote by party in Class I Senate elections
Year	Democratic	Republican	Third parties
2018	56.16% 24,522	42.83% 18,700	1.01% 442

Richardson city vote by party in Class II Senate elections
Year	Democratic	Republican	Third parties
2020	52.53% 27,963	45.05% 23,980	2.42% 1,289
2014	33.79% 8,265	61.99% 15,165	4.22% 1,032

== Education ==
=== Colleges and universities ===
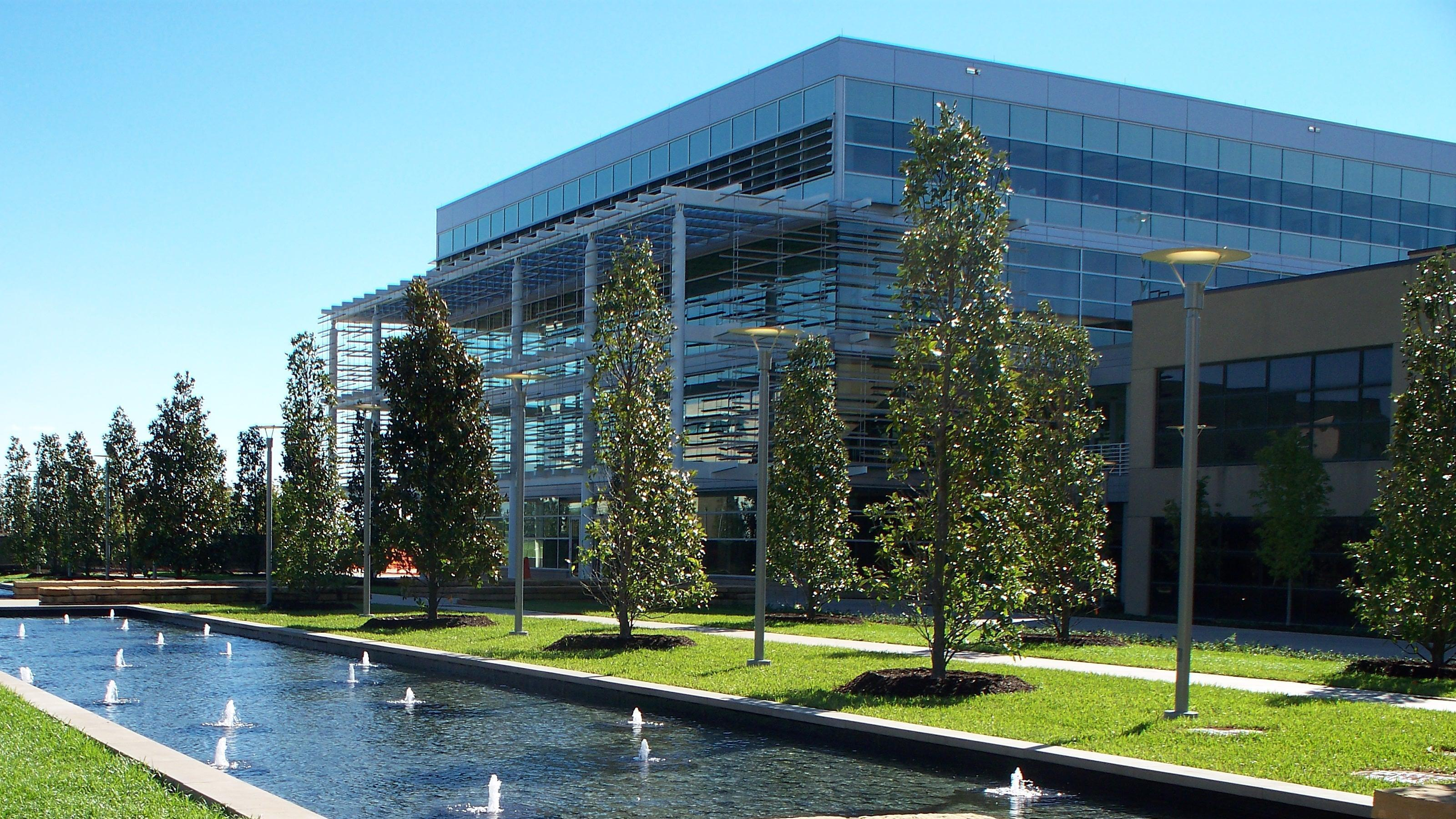
UT Dallas Student Services Building - a LEED Platinum Building

The University of Texas at Dallas, also referred to as UT Dallas or UTD, is a public research university in the University of Texas System. Despite its name the UT Dallas main campus, consisting of approximately 445 acres (1.80 km^{2}), is within the Richardson city limits at 800 West Campbell Road. The campus is sited with Campbell Road on the south, Floyd Road on the east, Waterview on the west, and Synergy Park Boulevard on the north. The university owns an additional 265 acres (1.07 km^{2}) in Richardson, adjacent to the campus, between Synergy Park Boulevard and the President George Bush Turnpike. The UTD Student Services building, completed in 2010, is the first academic structure in Texas to be rated a LEED Platinum facility by the United States Green Building Council. During 2016, construction was completed on the Student Services Building addition. New projects include an Alumni Center, a Brain Performance Institute and an engineering building as well as additional housing options. These enhancements are part of a campus renovation that has included hundreds of millions of dollars of investment in new and upgraded buildings since 2009. For the fall 2016 semester, UT Dallas had a total of 26,793 enrolled students.

Dallas College (formerly Dallas County Community College District or DCCCD) serves areas in Dallas County. Richland College of Dallas College is in Dallas on the Richardson border. It is the largest school in the DCCCD, featuring nearly 20,000 students. In 2005, Richland became the first community college to receive the Malcolm Baldrige National Quality Award.

Residents within Collin County are in the zone of Collin College.

=== Primary and secondary schools ===
==== Public schools ====
The city is served by the Richardson Independent School District (RISD) within the Dallas County portion of the city, and the Plano Independent School District (PISD) within the Collin County portion of the city. Despite that name, however, most of the Richardson Independent School District lies outside of the municipal boundaries of Richardson: 60 percent of RISD is in Dallas, with 35 percent in Richardson and 5 percent in Garland.

The RISD and PISD have many Blue Ribbon Schools. The Blue Ribbon Schools Program is a United States government program created to honor schools. The Blue Ribbon award is considered to be the highest honor that an American school can achieve.

Zoned RISD high schools in Richardson include Richardson High School, Lloyd V. Berkner High School, and J.J. Pearce High School. The Christa McAuliffe Learning Center is also in Richardson. Lake Highlands High School is part of the Richardson Independent School District but is located in Lake Highlands, an area in Dallas just south of Richardson.

Sections of Richardson in the Plano Independent School District are served by several schools. Aldridge, Haggar, Miller, Schell, and Stinson elementary schools are within Richardson and serve Collin County portions of Richardson. A section of Collin County Richardson is zoned to Mendenhall Elementary School in Plano. Otto, Frankford and Wilson middle schools in Plano and Murphy Middle School in Murphy serve separate sections of Collin County Richardson. Vines High School and T.H. Williams High School, 9–10 schools in Plano, serve separate sections of Collin County Richardson, along with McMillen High School in Murphy. Plano Senior High School and Plano East Senior High School also serve separate sections of Collin County Richardson.

==== Private schools ====
The Roman Catholic Diocese of Dallas operates two K–8 schools, St. Joseph School and St. Paul the Apostle School in Richardson. Other private schools include Canyon Creek Christian Academy (K–12), North Dallas Adventist Academy (K–12), IANT Quranic Academy (K–12), The Alexander School (8–12), Dallas North Montessori School (ages 3–9), and Salam Academy (K–12).

==== Charter schools ====
Four charter schools operate within the City of Richardson. These include the Evolution Academy Charter School (9–12), Premier High School of Richardson (6–12), Vista Academy of Richardson (K–12), and the Winfree Academy Charter School (Richardson) (9–12).

=== Public libraries ===
The Richardson Public Library is located at 900 Civic Center Drive at the southwest corner of U.S. Route 75 (North Central Expressway) and Arapaho Road.

The roots of the Richardson Public Library date back to 1947 when a branch of the Dallas County Library was established in a section of the Cash Dry Goods store on East Main Street in downtown Richardson. The fledgling library collection numbered about 400 volumes and was managed by Jessie Durham the store's proprietor. The city council established the library as a city department in 1958 and in 1959 the library moved into a newly constructed building at 310 Tyler Street. This new library was just under 6,000 square feet (560 m^{2}) in size and was built at a cost of $100,000.

Richardson was experiencing rapid growth in the 1960s and 1970s, and the library facility soon became inadequate for community needs. The current facility was constructed at a cost of $2 million and opened December 1, 1970. The new 81,650-square-foot (7,586 m^{2}), four-story building opened with the use of two floors and a small portion of a third. The basement was finished in 1980 for the reference collection and services. In 1995 the library underwent another expansion which finished the upper floor and renovated the three previously opened floors. Another renovation occurred in 2006 when the Youth Services department was expanded.

In 2008 the library set a new record for the number of items circulated in a fiscal year when the 1 millionth item was checked out in the fall of 2008. The building has undergone building renovations and technological improvements in recent years that have enhanced the library experience for patrons. Since 2014, the digital library has expanded to include movies, music and magazines as well as books and audiobooks. In 2015, the Richardson Library established a "makerspace" that initially included a 3D printer, designated computers with creative applications and software, and kits for the early exploration of electronics.

The Texas Municipal League recognized the library with its "Achievement of Excellence in Libraries" award every year from 2004 to 2017.

== Transportation ==
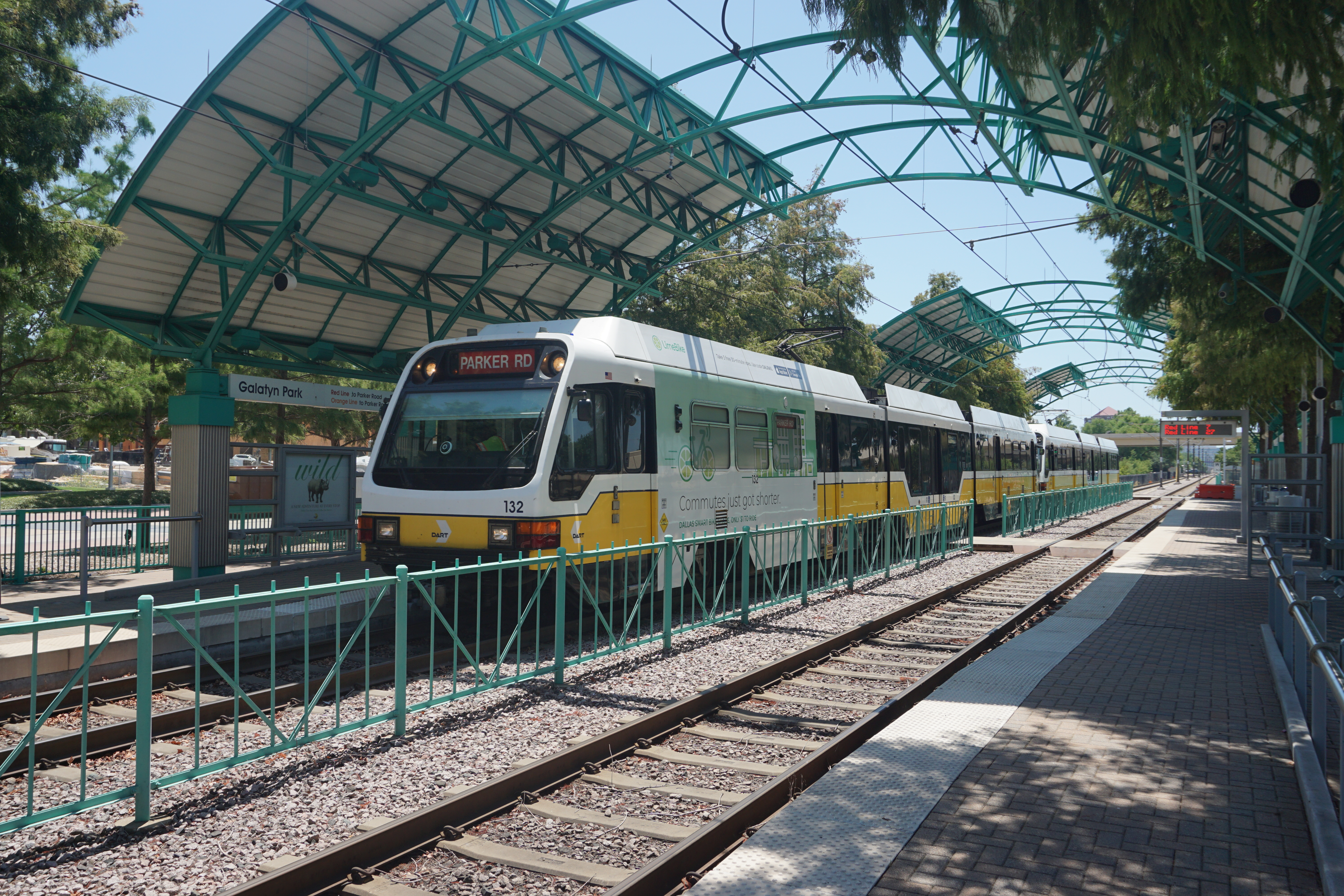
A DART rail Red Line train at Galatyn Park station in Richardson

Richardson and the region benefit from the location of two major highways in the city. The President George Bush Turnpike, running east–west along the northern border of the city, provides a convenient connection to the Dallas Fort Worth International Airport, as well as links to IH 35E, IH 30, IH20, SH 114, and SH 183 west of the city as well as a second link to IH30 east of the city.

Richardson also benefits from the Dallas Area Rapid Transit (DART) Light Rail line which parallels U.S. 75 and has four stations in the city. In October 2016, DART approved the future construction of the Silver Line commuter rail with the adoption of its 20-Year Financial Plan. The Silver Line has been in service since October 25, 2025. The Silver Line connects DFW Airport to the eastern side of Plano, with stations in Richardson located at The University of Texas at Dallas and CityLine. The Silver Line also connects to Trinity Metro's TEXRail line, which connects downtown Fort Worth to DFW Airport. In order to take full advantage of these transportation assets for development and redevelopment purposes, the City has implemented three Tax Increment Financing (TIF) Districts. TIF District #1 was established in November 2006, encompassing both sides of the U.S. 75 corridor from Campbell Road south to Spring Valley Road, and then extending west from U.S. 75 along Spring Valley Road to Coit Road. TIF District #2, established in November 2011, is bounded by President George Bush Turnpike on the north, Wyndham Lane on the east, Renner Road on the south, and the DART rail line on the west. TIF District #3, established in November 2011, is bounded by President George Bush Turnpike on the north, the DART rail line on the east, Renner Road on the South and has its western boundary between Alma Road and U.S. 75. Dallas County participates financially in TIF District #1 and Collin County participates financially in TIF District #2 and TIF District #3.

=== Central Trail ===
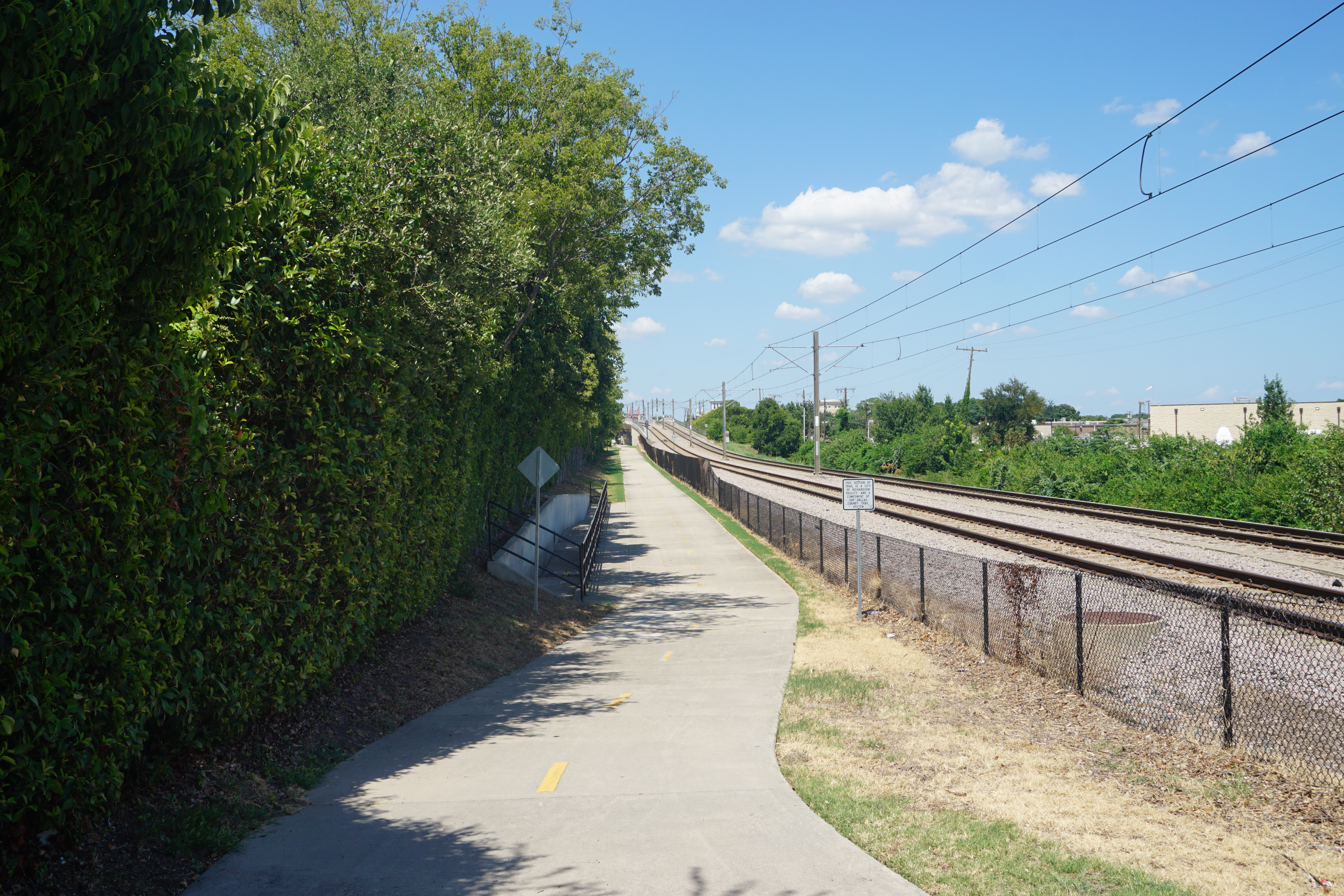
Central Trail

Central Trail is a 12-foot-wide multi-use concrete path which is mostly parallel to U.S. 75. The southern Central Trail extension opened in June 2014 and the northern extension opened in 2015. The new hike and bike trail segments mean that the central spine to Richardson's trail network will run from city limit to city limit, eventually connecting to trails throughout the region.

=== Bike lanes ===
In July 2015, Richardson was named a Bronze Bicycle Friendly Community by the League of American Bicyclists. Richardson has a long-range plan to provide bicycle facilities and to designate preferred bicycle routes on lower-volume, lower-speed roadways. There are now more than 15 miles of bike lanes in Richardson.

=== Major highways ===
- Interstate 635 (Lyndon B. Johnson Freeway)
- U.S. Highway 75 (North Central Expressway)
- State Highway 190 (President George Bush Turnpike) (toll)

=== Light rail ===
- DART: Red Line and Orange Line
  - Spring Valley
  - Arapaho Center
  - Galatyn Park
  - CityLine/Bush

== Notable people ==
=== Arts ===
- Pegah Anvarian, fashion designer
- Steve Benson, Pulitzer Prize-winning editorial cartoonist
- Tracy Hutson, stylist, Extreme Makeover: Home Edition
- Joyce Yu-Jean Lee, artist
- Faris McReynolds, artist

=== Actors ===
- Jensen Ackles, actor/musician
- Nicole Bilderback, actress
- Catherine Crier, television personality
- Bill Engvall, actor and comedian
- Deborah Foreman, actress
- Caleb Landry Jones, actor/musician
- Jaren Lewison, actor
- Jake McDorman, actor
- Kin Shriner, actor
- Nick Stahl, actor
- Barry Watson, actor, 7th Heaven

=== Businesspeople ===
- Ghassan Elashi, co-founder of InfoCom Corporation
- Bette Nesmith Graham, inventor of Liquid Paper and mother of Michael Nesmith

=== Entertainers ===
- Ryan Cabrera, entertainer
- Jeff Dunham, ventriloquist and stand-up comedian
- Jay Johnson, ventriloquist
- Gordon Keith, radio personality
- Wil Shriner, humorist
- Ashlee Simpson, entertainer
- Jessica Simpson, entertainer

=== Filmmakers ===
- Jeremy Coon, film producer
- David Gordon Green
- Mike Judge, creator of King of the Hill and Beavis and Butt-Head

=== Music ===
- John Gary, RCA recording artist- vocalist
- Todd P, New York City-based indie rock concert promoter
- Frank Ticheli, composer, professor emeritus of Music at the University of Southern California

=== Politicians ===
- Angie Chen Button, state representative from District 112 in Dallas County
- Tony Goolsby, politician
- Patti Ruff, Iowa politician
- Charles E. Turner, former mayor of Dallas
- Scott Turner, executive director of the White House Opportunity and Revitalization Council, Texas representative, and National Football League player

=== Sports ===
- Jeff Agoos, soccer player
- Lance Armstrong (born 1971), former cyclist
- Justin Che, soccer player
- Keenan Evans (born 1996), basketball player in the Lithuanian Basketball League (LKL) and the Euroleague
- Nolan Fontana, baseball player
- Chris Jacke, NFL kicker
- Eddie Jackson, NFL defensive back
- Mark Kellogg, college basketball coach
- Justin Leonard, professional golfer
- Liam McNeeley, basketball player
- Shawn Michaels, WWE wrestler
- Lee Nguyen, soccer player
- Carla Overbeck, founding member, Women's United Soccer Association
- Jake Palisch, baseball player
- Matt Stover, NFL kicker
- Everson Walls, NFL defensive back
- Chris Wilson, American football coach

=== Writers ===
- Rogers Cadenhead, author
- Deborah Crombie, mystery writer
- Gjekë Marinaj, Albanian-American poet
- Anne Rice, author
- John Maddox Roberts, science fiction author
- Brian Torrey Scott, writer

=== Others ===
- T. J. Cloutier, professional poker player
- Jeremy Wade Delle, student and subject of Pearl Jam's "Jeremy"
- David Koresh
- Joe S. Lawrie, U.S. Army major general
- Marina Oswald Porter, wife of Lee Harvey Oswald at the time of the Kennedy assassination

== Bibliography ==
- Braithwaite, Barbara (editor). A History Of Richardson. Richardson, Texas: Richardson Centennial Corporation, 1973.
- Gillespie, Gwyn. Historic Richardson: An Illustrated History. San Antonio, Texas: Historical Publishing Network, 2002.
- Harris, Janet (editor). And The Telling Takes Us Back: An Oral History of Richardson. Richardson, Texas: University of Texas at Dallas Center for Continuing Education, c1984-85. (Note: Part 1 consists of 21 interviews with representatives of families who settled in and helped in the development of the city. It covers the time period of early settlement to 1940. Part 2 begins with 1940 and continues to 1985.)

== See also ==
- Dallas Repertory Company Theater
