= Spring Valley station (DART) =

DART rail station in Richardson, Texas

Spring Valley
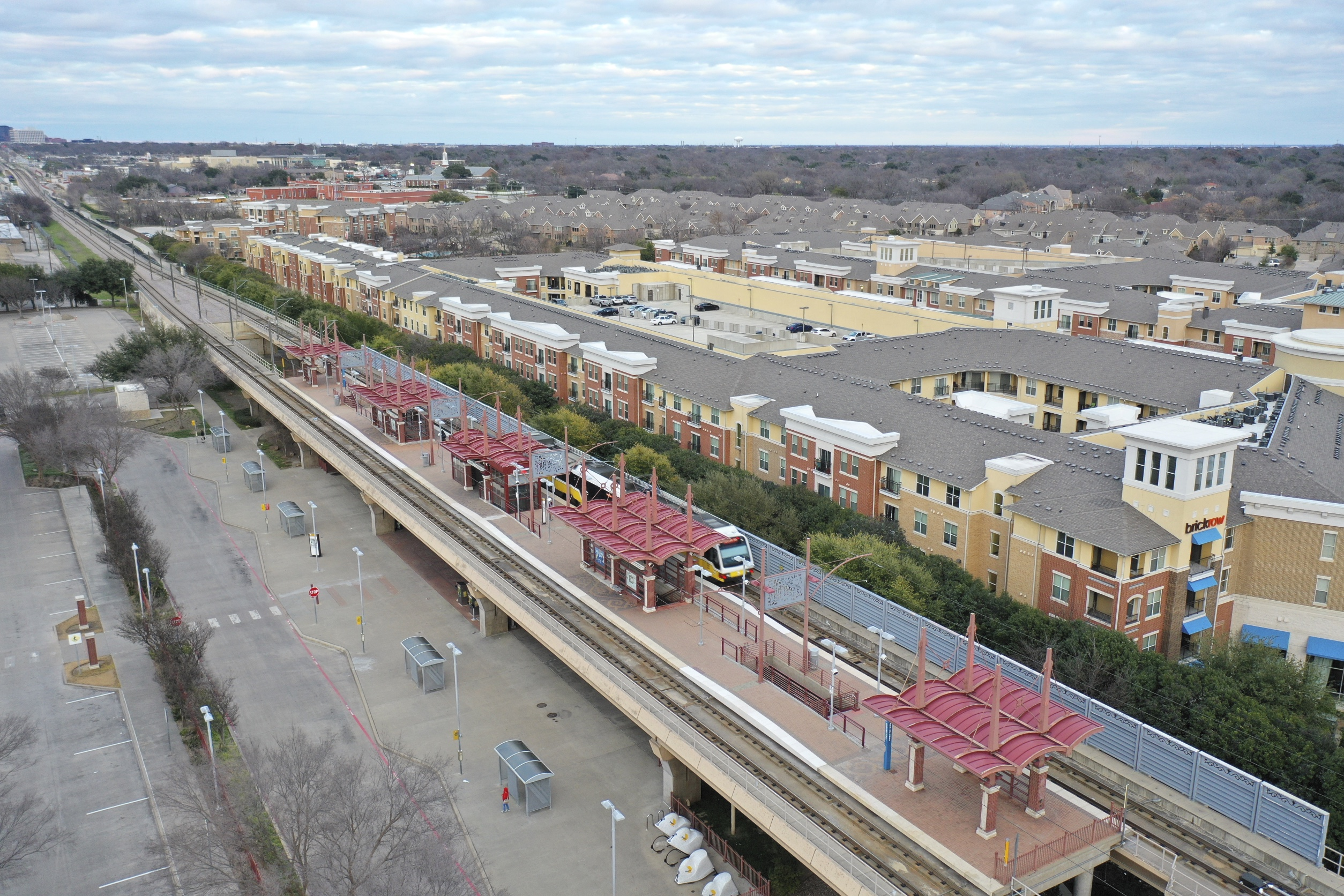

General information
- Location: 100 West Spring Valley Road; Richardson, Texas
- Coordinates: 32°56′27″N 96°44′15″W
- System: DART rail
- Owner: Dallas Area Rapid Transit
- Platforms: Island
- Connections: DART: Routes 200,202, and 250

Construction
- Structure type: Elevated
- Parking: 405 spaces
- Cycle facilities: 4 lockers, 1 rack
- Accessible: Yes

History
- Opened: July 1, 2002

Services
Preceding station	DART	Following station
LBJ/Central toward Westmoreland	Red Line	Arapaho Center toward Parker Road
LBJ/Central toward DFW Airport Terminal A	Orange Line (peak-hour only)	Arapaho Center toward Parker Road
Location

Spring Valley station is a DART rail station in Richardson, Texas. The station is located on Spring Valley Road, approximately 1/2 mile (0.80 km) east of North Central Expressway (US 75). It serves the Red Line and, during peak periods, the Orange Line.

The station serves southern Richardson, including the headquarters of fashion company Fossil Group. The station is adjacent to Brick Row, a mixed-use development which contains apartments, townhomes, condominiums, and retail space.

== History ==
An elevated station on Spring Valley Road was first proposed and approved in 1997. The station was expected to serve commuters on Spring Valley, including the then-headquarters for Blue Cross Blue Shield of Texas. The city of Richardson sought a state grant to build a pedestrian bridge between the station and local businesses, but no bridge was ever built.

The station was constructed as part of the Red Line's second expansion, which stretched from Walnut Hill to Galatyn Park. Construction of the extension started in 1999. The station was decorated with a floral theme and two 10-foot (3.0 m) brick sculptures. The extension was opened to revenue service on July 1, 2002.

=== Development ===
Shortly before the station opened, the City of Richardson announced a study to determine development plans around Spring Valley station, Arapaho Center station, and a proposed station in downtown Richardson. In 2004, the city announced the creation of the Spring Valley Station District, a 61-acre mixed-use development zone in the area surrounding the station.

In 2006, plans were announced for Centennial Park, a 30-acre project directly east of the station in the Spring Valley Station District. The development would include apartments, townhomes, and condominiums for a total of 950 residences. In 2008, shortly after construction began, the development was renamed Brick Row.
