= Joyce Yu-Jean Lee =

American visual artist

Joyce Yu-Jean Lee (b. 1979) is a visual artist working with video, photography, interactive installation and performance that combine social practice, institutional critique and activism together in an interdisciplinary practice. She is the founder of FIREWALL Internet Cafe social software consisting of a Google and Baidu dual-search engine that garnered backlash from Chinese state authorities in 2016.

== Background ==
Lee was born in Richardson, Texas to Chinese-Taiwanese immigrants, James C. and Patty Lee. Her siblings are architect, Juliet Lee and Joshua Lee. Her cousin is jazz pianist, Helen Sung. She graduated with a Bachelor of Arts from the College of Arts & Sciences, University of Pennsylvania in 2002 with a major in Communication and double minors in Psychology and Fine Art.

In 2010, Lee earned her Masters of Fine Arts from the Maryland Institute College of Art from the Mount Royal School of Art (interdisciplinary graduate program).

== Career ==
Lee was awarded a Vermont Studio Center fellowship supported by the Joan Mitchell Foundation, as well as a Henry Walters Traveling Scholarship to the Netherlands and Germany by the Walters Museum in Baltimore, MD upon graduating with her MFA in 2010. In 2012, Lee held Passages, a solo exhibition at Hamiltonian Gallery, Washington D.C. In 2013, Lee was awarded the Maryland State Arts Council 2013 Individual Artist Award as well as the Franklin Furnace Fund Grant. The latter was instrumental in her creation of the social project FIREWALL. Lee was awarded the Asian Women Giving Circle grant in 2015 and in 2016, Lee launched the first popup exhibition of FIREWALL at Chinatown Soup in Chinatown, Manhattan.

Lee completed her first private permanent digital installation, Aqua Lumen, in Alexandria, VA. Aqua Lumen was commissioned by Gables Old Town North in 2019. The Delaware Contemporary hosted her for a solo exhibition in 2022, "Mesophotic Sanctuary". New York City Metropolitan Transportation Authority Arts & Design commissioned her for a public artwork in 2026 for Fulton Station in downtown Manhattan. The 52-screen video installation, "Manahatta Waterways: a Sanctuary" included collaborations with naturalists and marine biologists from Gotham Whale and the Long Island Aquarium.

Lee is currently and Associate Professor at Pratt Institute in Brooklyn, New York. She served as an Assistant Professor of Art & Digital Media at Marist College in Poughkeepsie, New York from 2018 to 2023.

== FIREWALL Internet Cafe ==
Joyce Yu-Jean Lee founded FIREWALL in 2016 as a not-for-profit socially engaged research and interactive art project about Internet censorship. The goal of FIREWALL is to investigate online censorship and foster public dialogue about Internet freedom. FIREWALL consists of a computer station with a dual-search engine that simultaneously shows image results of any queried term in both Google and Baidu, the primary search engine in China. The project website Firewallcafe.com contains an archive of search terms that participants have queried, image results of these searches, and user interaction to vote on whether these results are affected by censorship. FIREWALL has been exhibited internationally, including at the following locations: "Unfolding Connections" at New Media Art Space at Baruch College (2025), JACK (2024), The Austrian Association of Women Artists (VBKÖ) (2020), Center for Community Cultural Development in Hong Kong (2019), University of Michigan Penny W. Stamps School of Art & Design (2019), The Oslo Freedom Forum in Norway and New York (2017 - 2018, 2026).
