= Charles W. Eisemann Center for Performing Arts =

Performance hall in Richardson, Texas

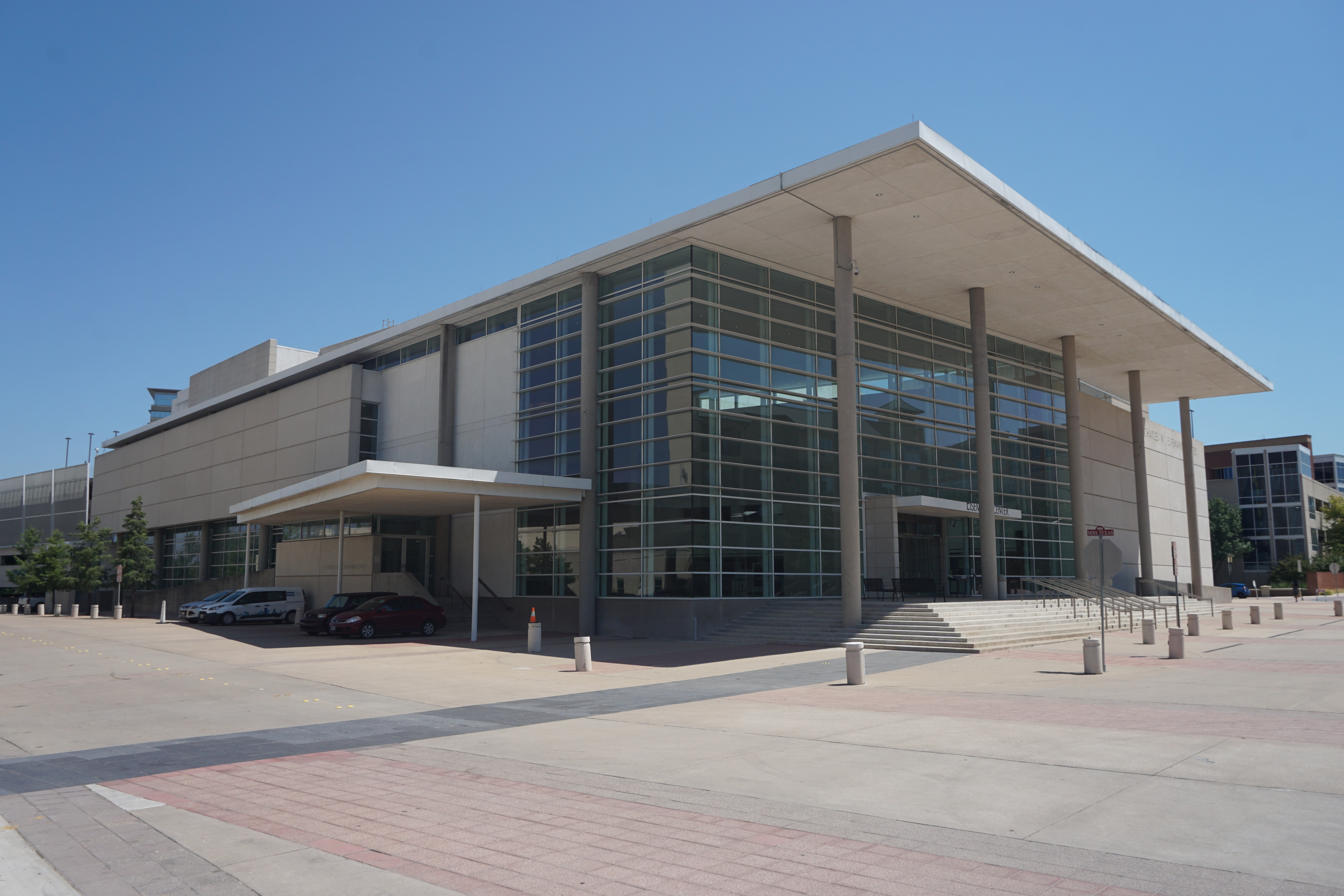
- Interactive map of the Charles W. Eisemann Center for Performing Arts area

General information
- Type: Performance hall
- Location: 2351 Performance Drive; Richardson, Texas
- Coordinates: 32.9855°N 96.7090°W
- Owner: City of Richardson, Texas

Technical details
- Floor count: 3 + basement
- Floor area: 116,900 sq ft (10,860 m^{2}).

Design and construction
- Architects: RTKL & PMK
- Main contractor: Hunt Construction

The Charles W. Eisemann Center for Performing Arts and Corporate Presentations is a performance hall, which opened in September 2002 in Richardson, Texas. The center is named for local philanthropist, Charles W. Eisemann, in recognition of a $2,000,000 gift from the Eisemann Foundation Fund of The Communities Foundation of Texas. It is the primary performance venue for the Plano Symphony Orchestra and the Richardson Symphony Orchestra.

== Facility ==
The Eisemann Center features three performance halls: the Margaret and Al Hill Performance Hall, the Bank of America Theatre, and the Bank of America Hall. All venues are connected by a lobby on three levels.

Designed by architect Eurico R. Francisco, AIA, of RTKL, the building was honored with design awards from the Dallas Chapter of the American Institute of Architects in 2001 ("Unbuilt Honor Award") and again in 2003 ("Built Honor Award"), in addition to receiving a "Best of Texas Award" for buildings over $50 million from McGraw Hill in 2002.

=== Margaret and Al Hill Performance Hall ===
The Margaret and Al Hill Performance Hall is a 1,563-seat venue and is one of the largest stage areas in the DFW Metroplex. The construction of this hall was designed to meet the production needs for dance, opera, and musical theater as well as other events. By featuring a full working stage house, an adjustable proscenium opening, orchestra pit and lift, customized Wenger orchestra shell, 4,815 sq ft (447.3 m^{2}) of stage space, wood sprung floor, and a full lighting and sound package, the Hill Performance Hall can accommodate varied productions. The audience chamber was built with acoustically sculpted natural wood-clad walls which assist in diminishing sound vibrations for symphonic music, dance, theater, opera, and a wide range of concerts and other events.

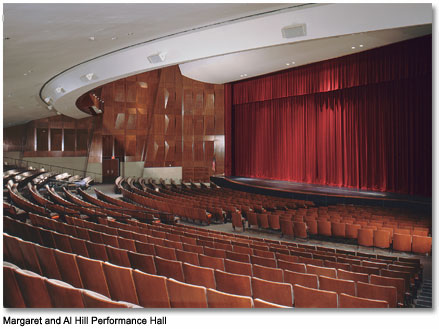
The Margaret and Al Hill Performance Hall

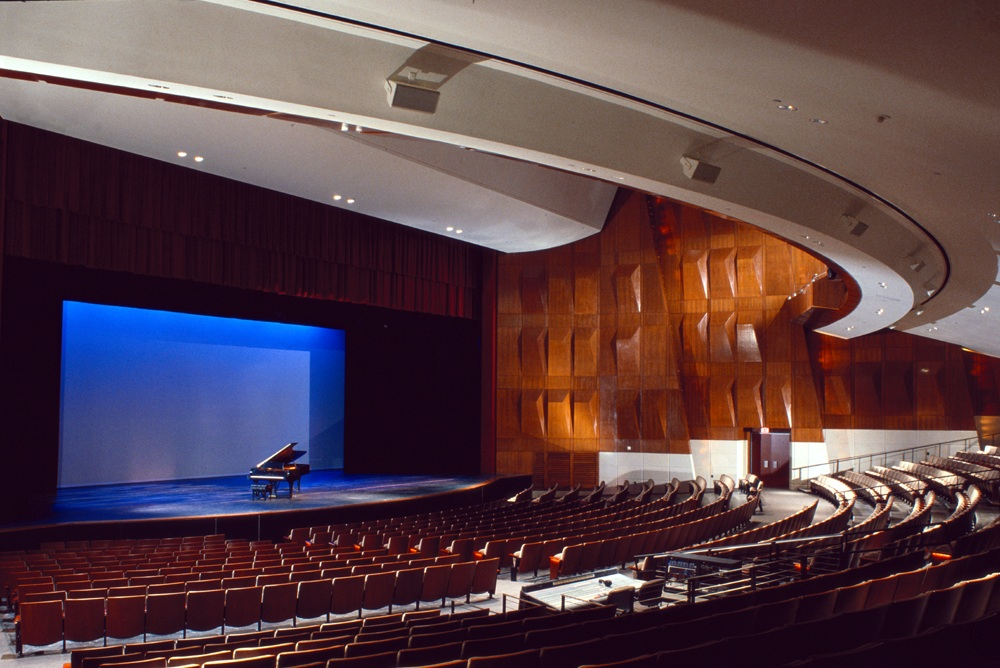
View of the stage

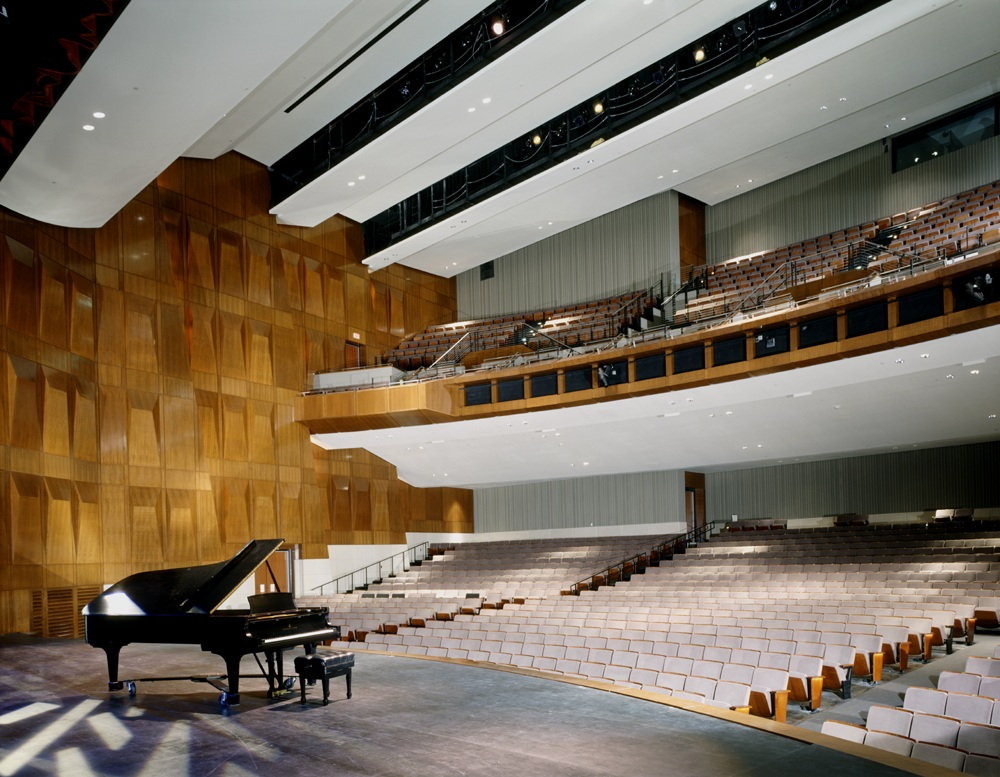
View from the stage

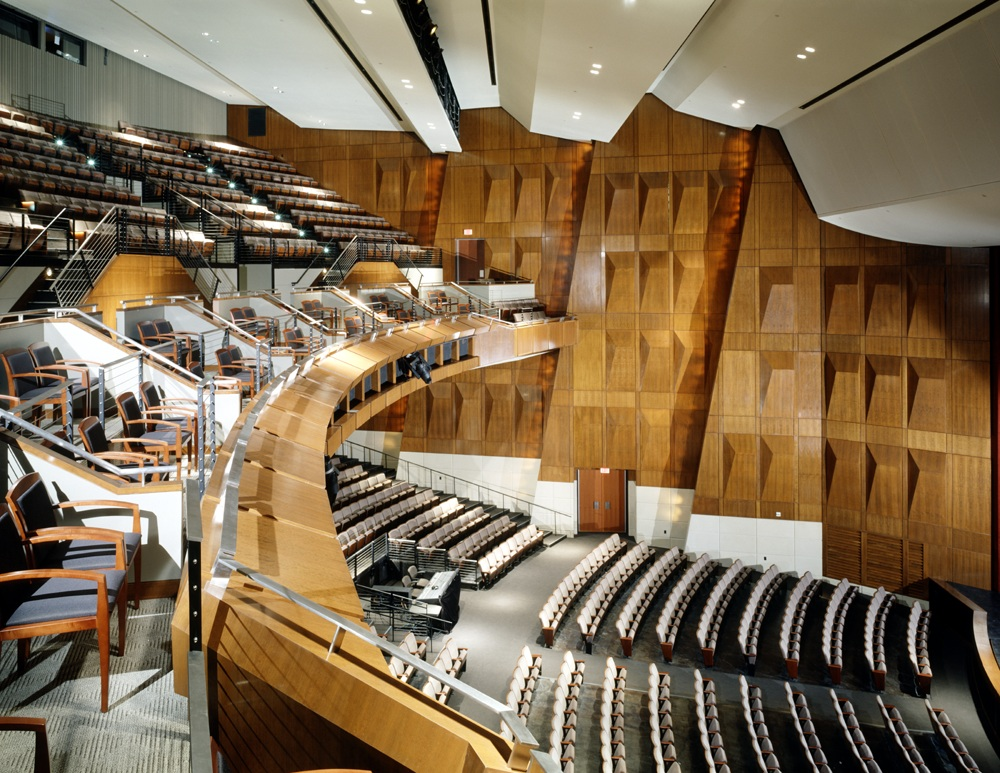
View of mezzanine and orchestra level

=== Bank of America Theater ===
The Bank of America Theater seats between 230 and 400 people, depending on the configuration. The venue features a full working stage house, a 36-foot (11m) wide proscenium opening, and 1,914 sq ft (177.8 m^{2}). of stage space. The space can also be converted to a thrust or full round performance venue by extending the stage into the middle of the audience chamber. In addition, an exposed catwalk system allows lighting from all angles.

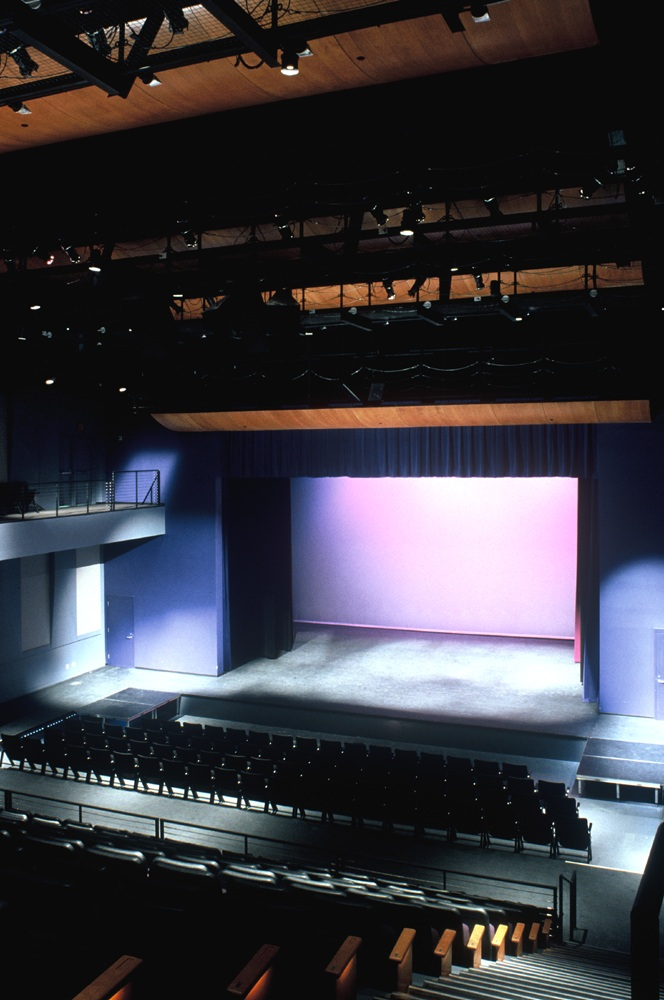
View of the stage

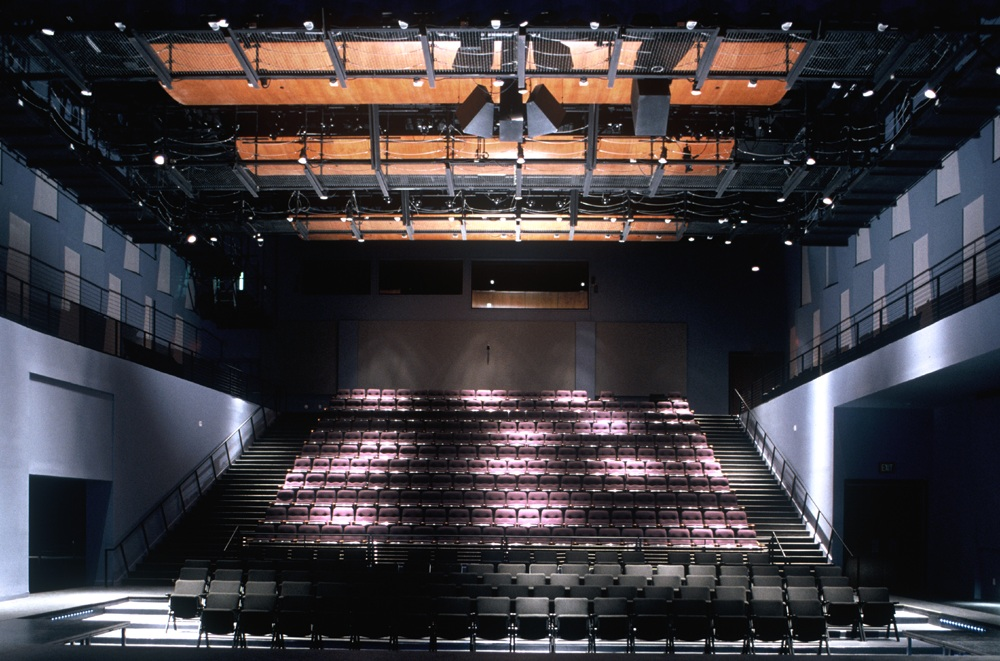
View from the stage

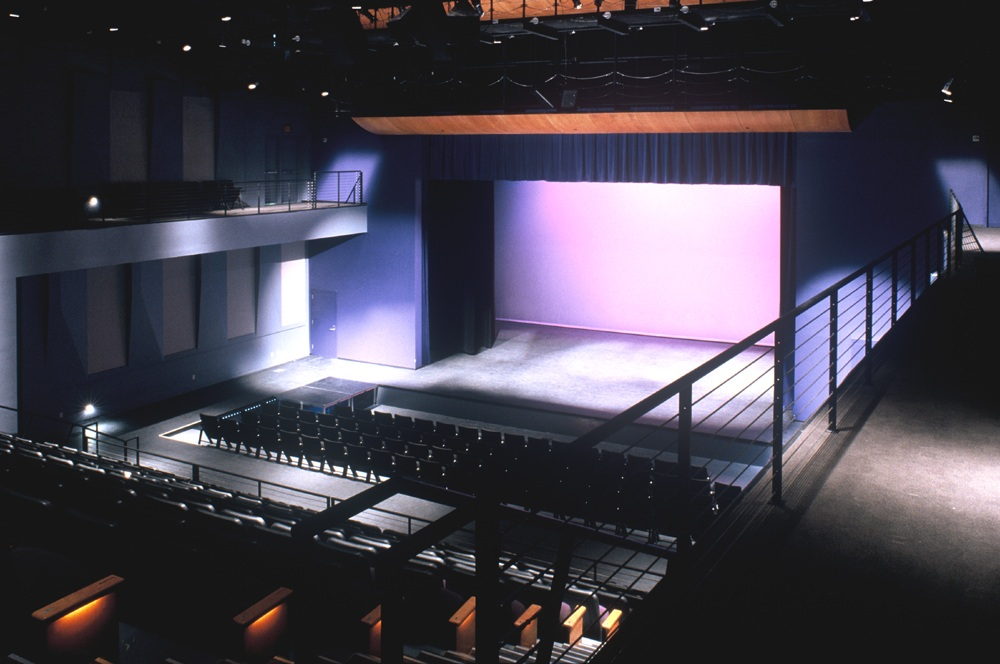
View from upper side

=== Bank of America Hall ===
The Bank of America Hall provides space for hosting private receptions, banquets, meetings, seminars, recitals, small tradeshows and exhibits. The 3,150 sq ft (293 m^{2}) room features a barrel-vaulted ceiling, cove lighting, hardwood flooring and a full range of A/V production equipment. A catering prep kitchen is located adjacent to the room to assist caterers with servicing these occasions. Depending on the setup of the room, it can hold up to 180 for a seated dinner and up to 300 for receptions. Pre/post-event activities may also be held in the Bank of America Hall in conjunction with the use of the larger performance venue.

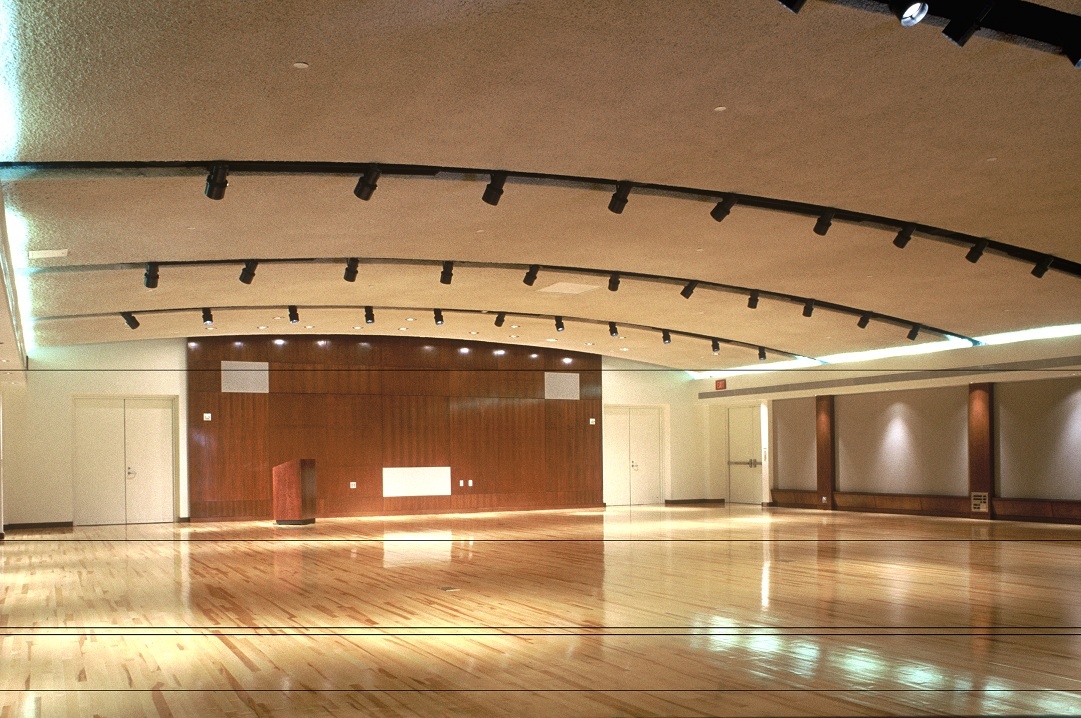
Bank of America Hall

=== Lobby and Public Areas ===
The Eisemann Center offers patrons a 16,686 sq ft (1,550.2 m^{2}) lobby spanning three levels. The Leftwich Grand Foyer features a 42-foot (13 m) high ceiling, concession area and ticket office. A staircase leads up to the Green Mezzanine-Gallery which features the art gallery, while another staircase takes patrons to the TXU Lobby and the Bank of America Hall. Cast-stone and natural wood walls, terrazzo floors and a wide expanse of glass create a dramatic and welcoming sense of occasion.

The ticket office handles all online purchases as well as walk-up sales, telephone, fax and mail inquiries.

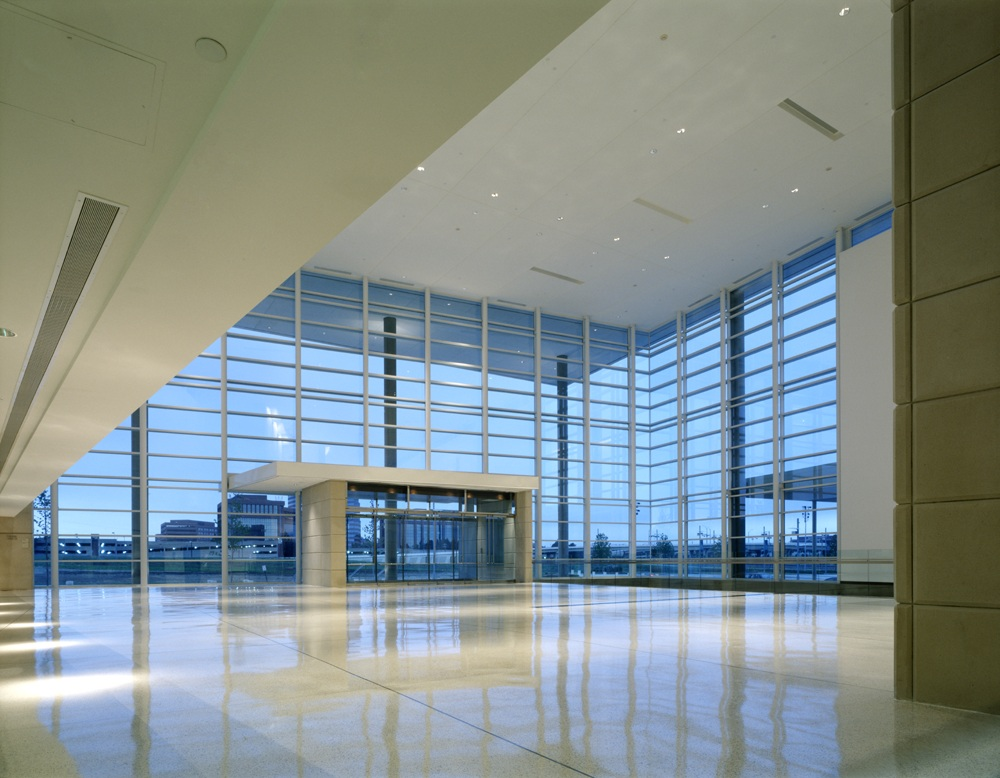

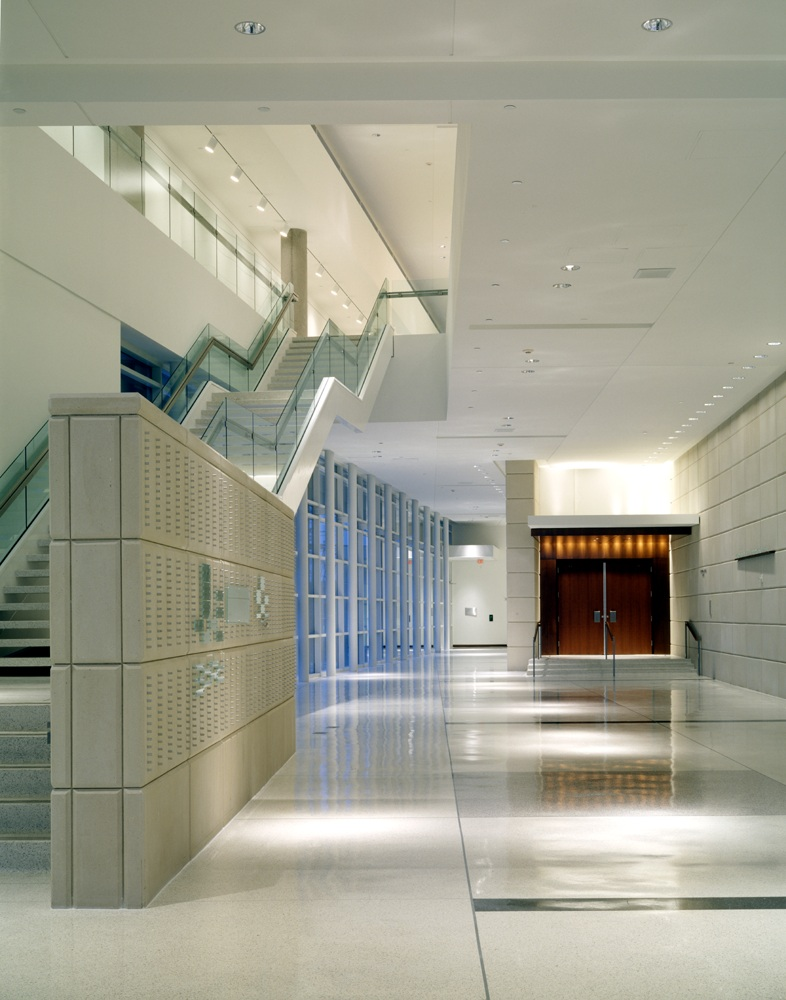

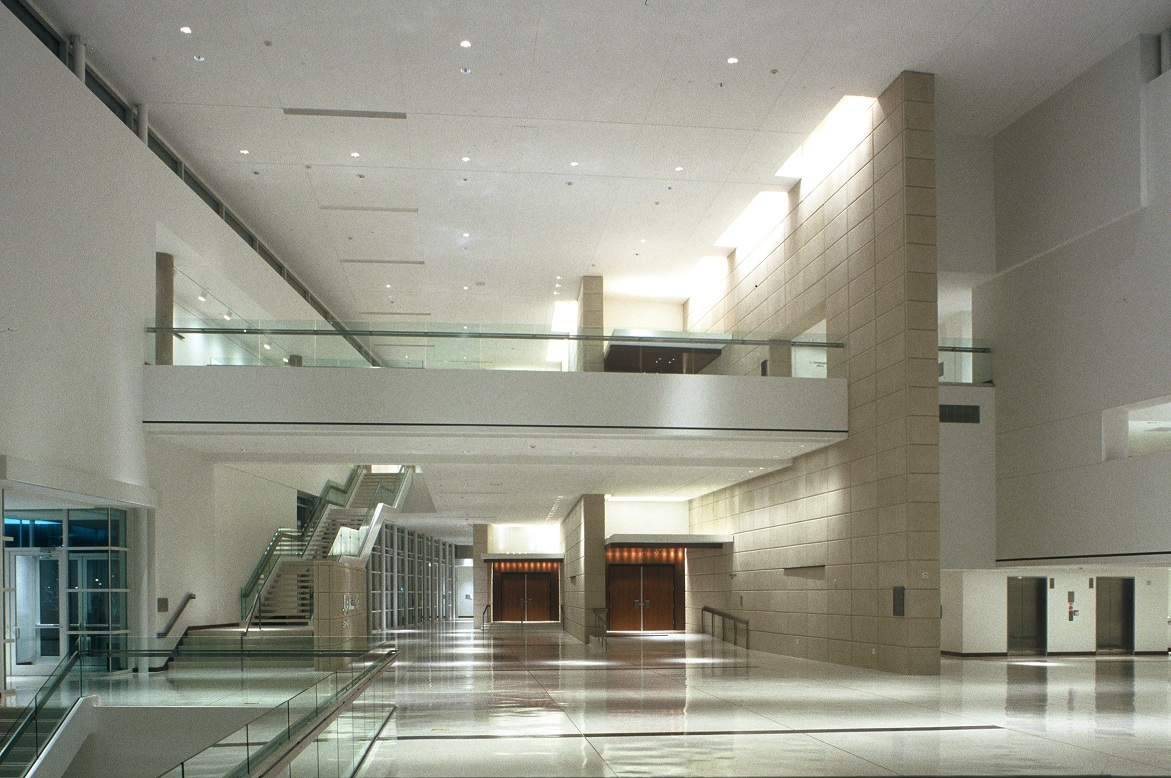

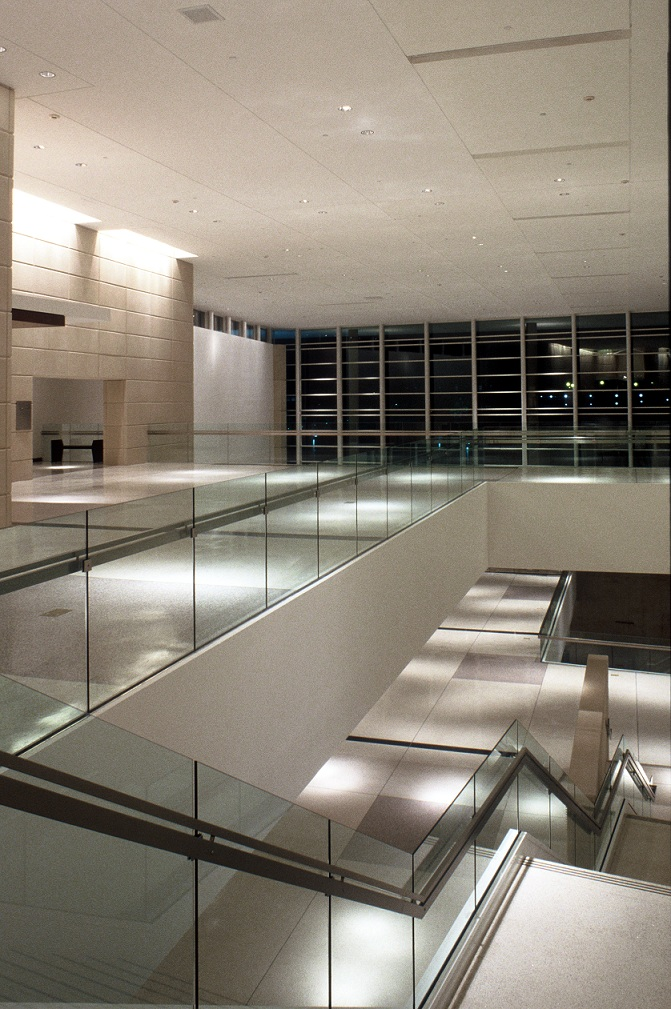

==== Seven Muses artwork ====
The City of Richardson and supporters of the Charles W. Eisemann Center celebrated the completion and unveiling of the lightpainting “Seven Muses” by artist Stephen Knapp in April 2006. The commission of the lightpainting was made possible by a gift to the City from Jim and Gayla Von Ehr of Richardson.

In an interview with Adrienne Garnett in Art of the Times, Knapp, when asked about “Seven Muses” said, “I want people to see and feel the energy that is emanating from the center of it. I want people to see the subtleties, not just the bright colors that are associated with my work. A lot of time is dedicated to making this about discovering extraordinary possibilities with light.”

== Location ==
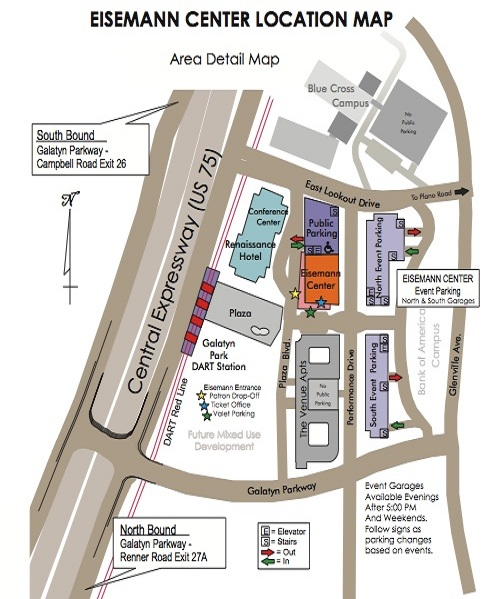
Detailed Map

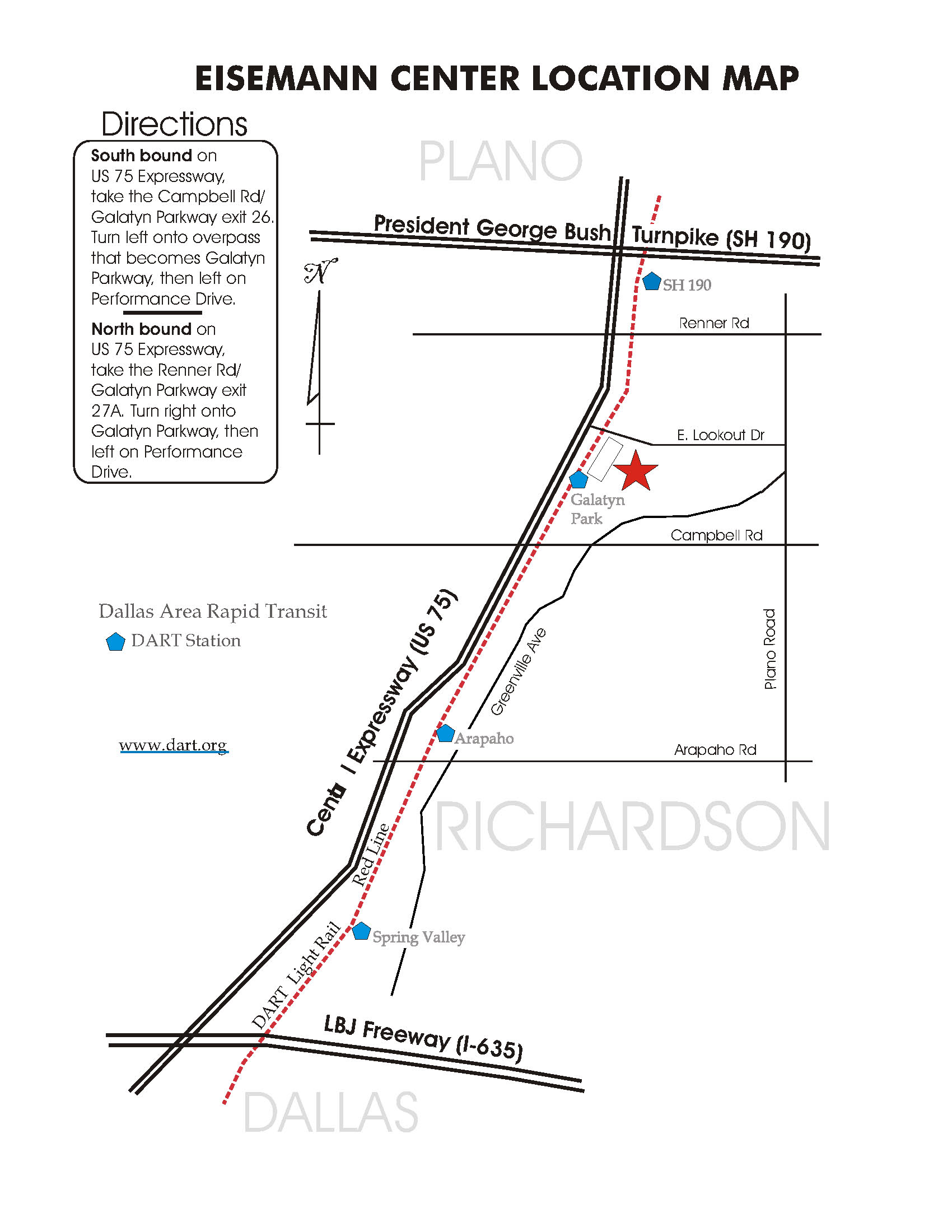
Area Map

Area and Detailed Maps for the Eisemann Center

The Eisemann Center is part of an urban village setting. The center is between the Renaissance Dallas-Richardson Hotel and the Galatyn Park DART station to the west and a number of multi-use buildings to the east and southeast including offices, restaurants, and residential complexes.

A public plaza features a water fountain.

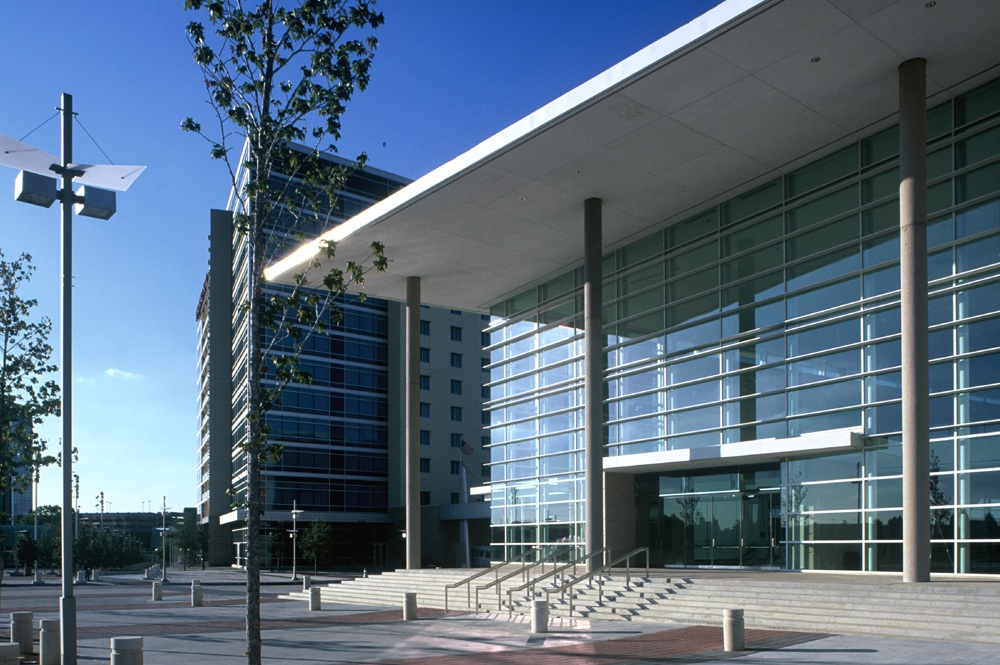

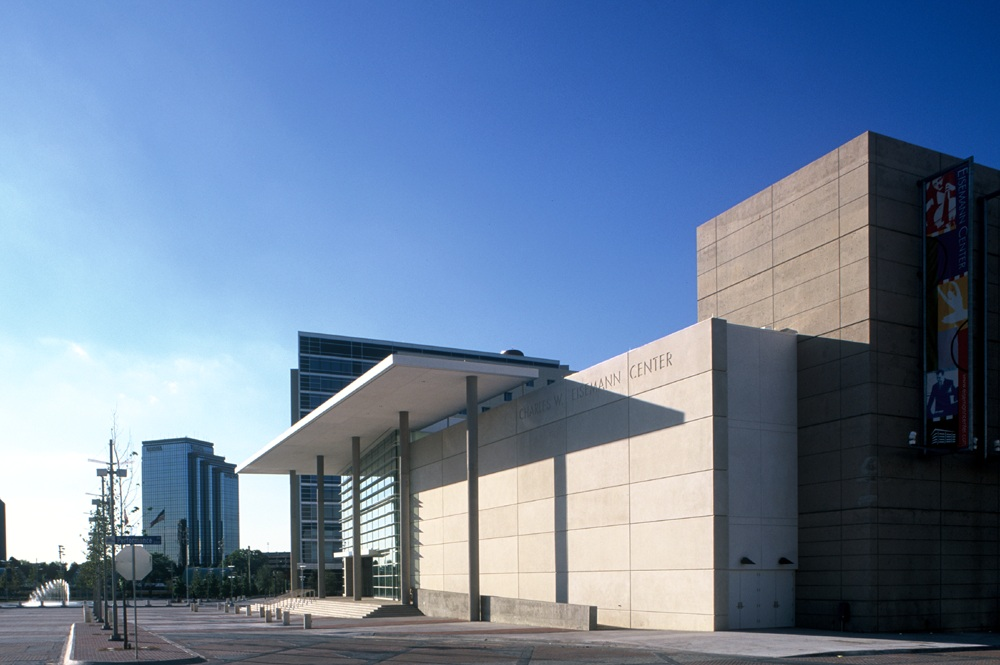

== Updates ==
In 2008, the Eisemann Center received a $500,000 grant from the Texas Instruments Foundation, to be used for a variety of projects that included a custom designed orchestra shell for the theater, additional interior and exterior signage, sound and lighting system upgrades, audiovisual equipment enhancements and facility system upgrades to enhance patron comfort.

In a City Council work session on October 26, 2009, Eisemann Center management gave a status update on the Eisemann Center Foundation as well as on the capital improvements funded by the grant.

== Eisemann Center Foundation ==
The Eisemann Center Foundation is used as a mechanism to receive philanthropic donations toward the Eisemann Center that need to be made to a 501c(3) organization. It was incorporated in the State of Texas in March 2002, and was granted recognition as a charitable foundation by the IRS in July 2002. This determination was reaffirmed by the IRS in December 2006.

The Foundation states, "[t]he primary purpose of the Corporation is to assist the City of Richardson, Texas and local groups and organizations to promote, support, improve and enhance the visual and performing arts at the Charles W. Eisemann Center for the Performing Arts and Corporate Presentations through the acceptance of land, bequests, and other donations to further the purpose of the Corporation."
