= Arapaho Center station =

Intermodal public transit station in Richardson, Texas

Arapaho Center
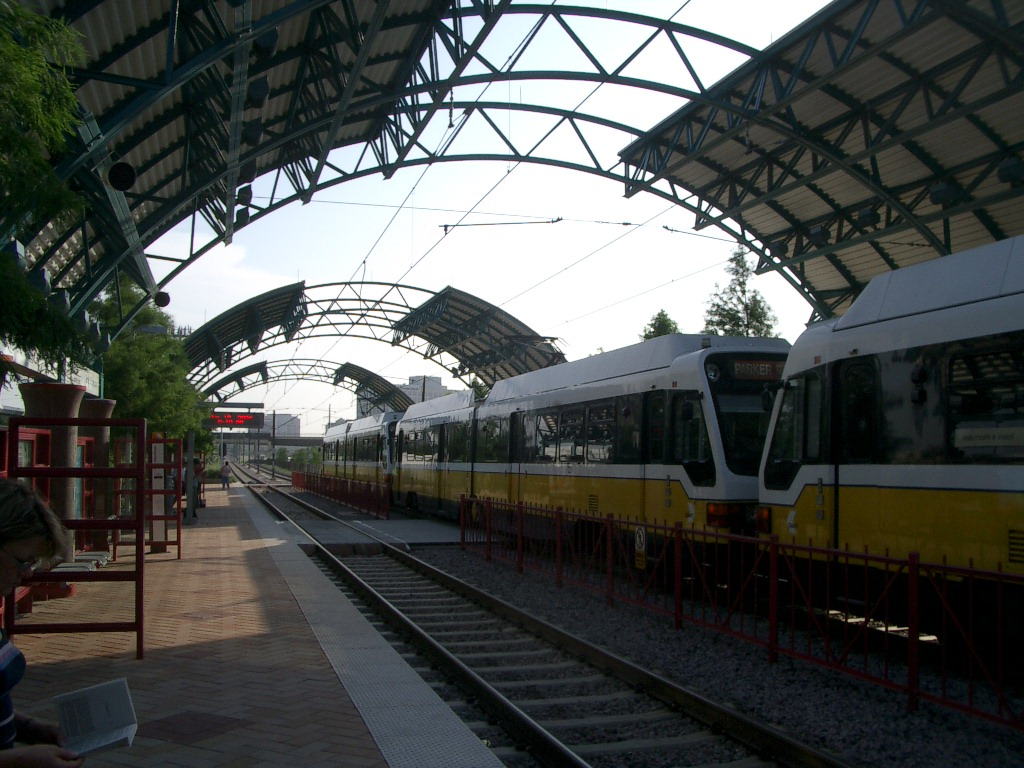
- Northbound train at rail platforms

General information
- Location: 1051 North Greenville Avenue; Richardson, Texas
- Coordinates: 32°57′49″N 96°43′22″W
- System: DART rail
- Owner: Dallas Area Rapid Transit
- Platforms: 2 side platforms
- Connections: DART: 238, 243, and 244

Construction
- Parking: 1,121 spaces
- Cycle facilities: 4 bike lockers, 1 bike rack
- Accessible: Yes

History
- Opened: August 27, 1990 (bus); July 1, 2002 (rail)

Services
Preceding station	DART	Following station
Spring Valley toward Westmoreland	Red Line	Galatyn Park toward Parker Road
Spring Valley toward DFW Airport Terminal A	Orange Line (peak-hour only)	Galatyn Park toward Parker Road
Location

Arapaho Center station (formerly Richardson Transit Center) is an intermodal public transit station in Richardson, Texas. Operated by Dallas Area Rapid Transit, the station services DART's Red Line and three bus routes. During peak periods, the station also services the Orange Line. The facility is DART's main bus transfer center in Richardson and includes an indoor waiting area.

The station is located at the intersection of Greenville Avenue and Arapaho Road, one block east of North Central Expressway (US 75). It services the Richardson Civic Center complex and the southern portions of Richardson's Telecom Corridor, including facilities for Honeywell and Verizon. A bus route at the station provides service to the University of Texas at Dallas.

== Station ==
Arapaho Center station consists of both a bus transfer facility and a rail station, which are located on opposite sides of Greenville Avenue. The bus side of the facility includes a large parking lot, two air-conditioned waiting rooms, and restrooms.

A short pedestrian tunnel under Greenville Avenue connects the bus and rail platforms. A street-level signaled crosswalk is also available. At the bus-side entrance to the crosswalk is an 8-foot (2.4 m) reproduction of Hans Van de Bovenkamp's sculpture Gateway and matching benches.

== History ==
=== Richardson Transit Center ===
DART first began bus service to Richardson in 1984 with an express bus route to Downtown Dallas. The route used Richardson Terrace Shopping Center as a temporary park-and-ride lot.

In 1989, DART broke ground on Richardson Transit Center, a $2 million parking lot and indoor waiting facility that would replace the Richardson Terrace park-and-ride. The facility opened the following year on August 27, 1990. It was the fourth indoor facility to be built by DART, after South Irving Transit Center, North Carrollton Transit Center, and West Plano Transit Center.

=== Arapaho Center ===
Original plans for the rail platforms at Richardson Transit Center called for a signaled pedestrian crosswalk to the parking lot and bus facility. Due to safety concerns, DART and the city opted to build a tunnel between the two platforms. The construction of the tunnel also led to improvements to the Arapaho/Greenville intersection, such as the addition of turn lanes.

On June 29, 2002, DART held an event, Super Saturday, at Arapaho Center and Forest Lane station to celebrate the Red Line's next extension, which would run from Park Lane to Galatyn Park. The extension, which included Arapaho Center, was officially inaugurated the following Monday.

When its rail service opened, Arapaho Center was the northernmost Red Line station with a park-and-ride lot, which resulted in the station's lot regularly exceeding capacity on workdays. Parking concerns at Arapaho subsided in December 2002 following the Red Line's next extension, which added two more park-and-ride stations (namely Bush Turnpike and Parker Road) to the line.
