= FIREWALL Internet Cafe =

FIREWALL Internet Café is an art project founded in 2016 by visual artist Joyce Yu-Jean Lee as a socially engaged research and interactive art project about Internet censorship. The not-for-profit goal of FIREWALL is to investigate online censorship and foster public dialogue about Internet freedom.

== Controversy ==
FIREWALL received backlash from the Chinese Government during one of the public roundtables on February 19, 2016, "Networked Feminism in China," about how feminists in China use the internet to build online networks and movements. On the eve prior to the event, one of the speakers, a visiting Chinese scholar and law fellow researching female reproductive rights, received threats from Chinese authorities overseas about their scheduled presentation. Ultimately, they did not participate, and an empty chair was left in their place, a nod to the empty chair of Liu Xiaobo during his Nobel Peace Prize ceremony on December 10, 2010.

== Reception ==
The Washington Post covered how FIREWALL Internet Café, a project about Internet censorship, was itself censored by Chinese authorities, while ArtFCity described how the Chinese Government might have sent citizens as agents to observe the Networked Feminism in China event in an act of cultural espionage. The China Digital Times covered FIREWALL in an article about how China's overseas critics are under pressure from the Central Government, and Hyperallergic described how this pressure resulted in an act of self-censorship.

Editorial Commentary The Daily Voice (South Korean Live Radio) expressed surprise at how attitudes that determine the Great Firewall goes beyond China's borders. The academic journal publication Index on Censorship described the escalating threats of the Chinese government and how FIREWALL Internet Café opened amidst an atmosphere of scrutiny. FIREWALL has also been covered by international language press including The Initium, Apple Daily Taiwan, and Hong Kong Free Press.

== Partners ==
FIREWALL Internet Café has received support from the following organizations: Franklin Furnace Fund, Asian Women Giving Circle, Lower Manhattan Cultural Council, Human Rights Foundation, Oslo Freedom Forum, Jigsaw LLC and the Marist College Strategic Plan Projects Advisory Committee.

== Exhibitions ==
FIREWALL Internet Café has exhibited at the following locations: Center for Community Cultural Development in Hong Kong (2019), University of Michigan Penny W. Stamps School of Art & Design in Ann Arbor, MI (2019), Alice Tully Hall at Lincoln Center in New York City, NY (2017), The Oslo Freedom Forum in Oslo, Norway (2017–2018), REDpoint in St. Pölten, Austria (2016), and Chinatown Soup in New York City, NY (2016).
