= Richardson Symphony Orchestra =

American symphony orchestra

- Orchestra
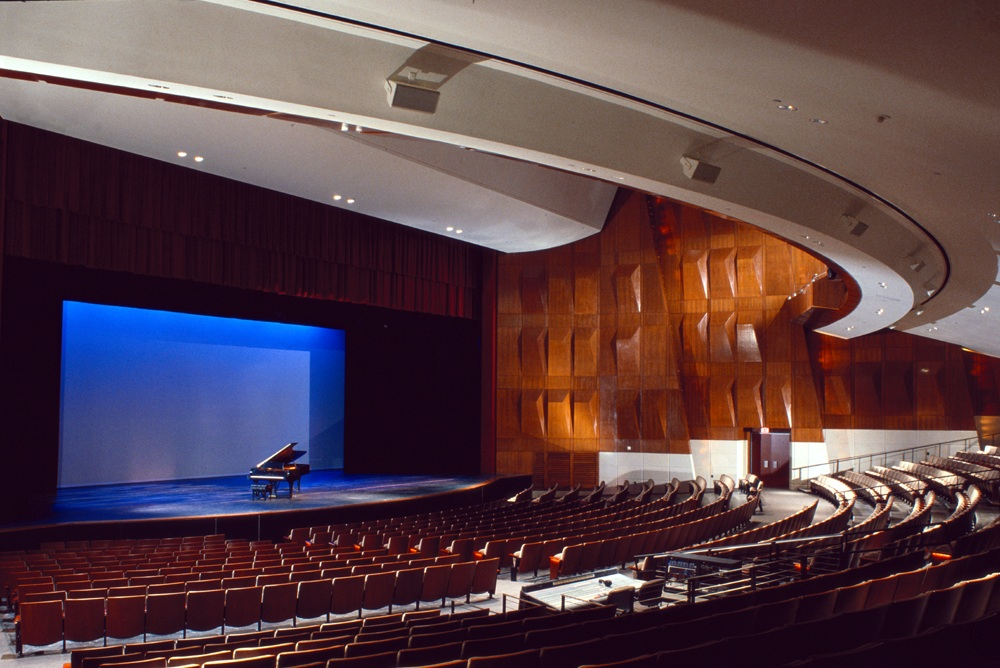
- Founded: 1961; 64 years ago
- Location: Richardson, Texas, United States
- Concert hall: Charles W. Eisemann Center for Performing Arts
- Music director: Clay Couturiaux
- Website: richardsonsymphony.org

The Richardson Symphony Orchestra (RSO) is an American symphony orchestra based in Richardson, Texas. The orchestra is resident at the Charles W. Eisemann Center for Performing Arts.

== History ==
The orchestra was founded in 1961.

Maestro Clay Couturiaux has served as the music director and conductor since 2012; he took over for Anshel Brusilow after his retirement.

== Music directors ==
- Chris Xeros (1961–1992)
- Anshel Brusilow (1992–2012)
- Clay Couturiaux (2012–present)
