= Hot comb =

Hair straightening tool

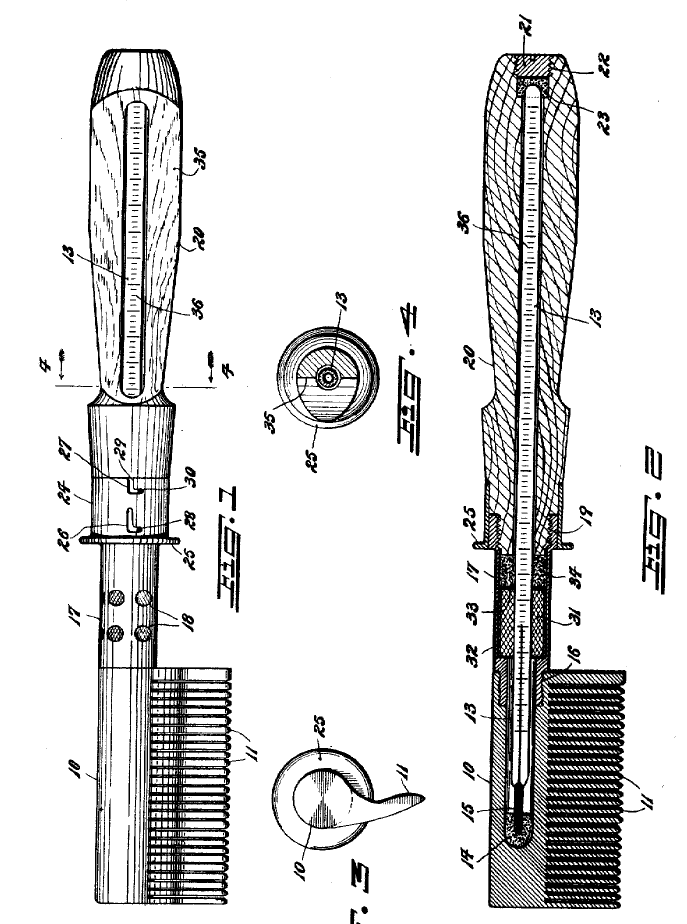
An illustration for a hot comb patent from 1920

A hot comb (also known as a straightening comb or pressing comb) is a metal comb that is used to straighten moderate or coarse hair and create a smoother hair texture. A hot comb is heated and used to straighten the hair from the roots. It can be placed directly on the source of heat or it may be electrically heated.

== History ==
The hot comb was an invention developed in France as a way for women with coarse curly hair to achieve a fine straight look traditionally modeled by historical Egyptian women.

Parisian Francois Marcel Grateau is said to have revolutionized hair styling when he invented and introduced heated irons to curl and wave his customers' hair in France in 1872. His Marcel Wave remained fashionable for many decades. Britain's Science and Society Library credits L. Pelleray of Paris with manufacturing the heated irons in the 1870s. An example of an 1890s version of Pelleray's curling iron is housed at the Chudnow Museum in Milwaukee.

Elroy J. Duncan is believed to have invented and manufactured the first hot comb or heated metal straightening comb in America, though she marketed it as a mustache grooming instrument. Sometimes the device is called a "pressing comb." During the late 19th century, Dr. Scott's Electric Curler was advertised in several publications including the 1886 Bloomingdale's catalog and in the June 1889 issue of Lippincott's Magazine Marketed to men to groom beards and moustaches, the rosewood-handled device also promised women the ability to imitate the "loose and fluffy" hairstyles of actress Lillie Langtry and opera singer Adelina Patti, popular white entertainers of the era.

Mme. Baum's Hair Emporium, a store on Eighth Avenue in New York with a large clientele composed mostly of African American women, advertised Mme. Baum's "entirely new and improved" straightening comb in 1912. In May and June 1914, other Mme. Baum advertisements claimed that she now had a "shampoo dryer and hair straightening comb," said to have been patented on April 1, 1914. U.S. Patent 1,096,666 for a heated "hair drying" comb – but not a hair straightening comb – is credited to Emilia Baum and was granted on May 12, 1914.

In May 1915, the Humania Hair Company of New York marketed a "straightening comb made of solid brass" for 89 cents. That same month, Wolf Brothers of Indianapolis advertised its hair straightening comb and alcohol heater comb for $1.00. The La Creole Company of Louisville claimed to have invented a self-heating comb that required no external flame. In September 1915, J. E. Laing, owner of Laing's Hair Dressing Parlor in Kansas City, Kansas claimed to have invented the "king of all straighteners" with a 3/4 inch wide, 9 1/2 inches long comb that also had a reversible handle to accommodate use with either the left or right hand. Indol Laboratories, owned by Bernia Austin in Harlem, offered a steel magnetic comb for $5.00 in November 1916.

Walter Sammons of Philadelphia filed an application for Patent No. 1,362,823 on April 9, 1920. The patent was granted on December 21, 1920. Poro Company founder Annie Malone has been credited by some sources with receiving the first patent for this tool in that same year but the Official Gazette of the U. S. Patent Office does not list her as a holder of a hot comb patent in 1920.

The Patent Office Gazette of May 16, 1922, however, includes Annie M. Malone of St. Louis in a list of patentees of designs as being granted Patent No. 60,962 for "sealing tape," which Chajuana V. Trawick describes in a December 2011 doctoral dissertation as an ornamental tape used to "secure the closure of the box lid of Poro products" to prevent others from selling products in packages made to look like Poro products.

Hair care entrepreneur Madam C. J. Walker never claimed to have invented the hot comb, though often has been inaccurately credited with the invention and with modifying the spacing of the teeth, but there is no evidence or documentation to support that assertion. During the 1910s, Walker obtained her combs from different suppliers, including Louisa B. Cason of Cincinnati, Ohio, who eventually filed patent application 1,413,255 on February 17, 1921 for a comb Cason had developed some years earlier. The patent was granted on April 18, 1922 though Cason had been producing the combs for many years without a patent.

== Potential consequences ==
It is not uncommon to burn and damage hair when using a traditional hot comb. A hot comb is often heated to over 65 degrees Celsius (149 degrees Fahrenheit), therefore if not careful severe burns and scarring can occur.

The hot petrolatum used with the iron was thought to cause a chronic inflammation around the upper segment of the hair follicle leading to degeneration of the external root sheath.

In 1992, a hot comb alopecia study was conducted, and it was discovered that there was a poor correlation between the usage of a hot comb and the onset and progression of disease. The study concludes that the term follicular degeneration syndrome (FDS) is proposed for this clinically and histologically distinct form of scarring alopecia.

Hot comb alopecia and follicular degeneration syndrome are irreversible alopecia of the scalp that was believed to occur in people who straighten their hair with hot combs, but this idea was later debunked.
