= Dallas Repertory Company Theater =

Theatre company in Richardson, Texas, USA

Repertory Company Theatre is a local theatre company in Richardson, Texas, boasting some of the most talented singers, actors, and dancers in the Metroplex. Artistic Director, Debra Carter. Founded in 1986, RCT has been voted "best theatre in Richardson" by the Dallas Morning News, as well as nominated for local theatre awards such as the Leon Rabin Awards and the Column Awards. Each Season the Theatre presents Broadway Musicals, Classic Plays and Special Presentations performed by the 60+ member REP Company. Rep Company auditions are held each January.

Past Main Stage Productions include...

- Footloose
- My Fair Lady
- The Women
- Urinetown

the Dallas, Texas area* Born Yesterday

- Broadway's Best
- Little Women

== School ==
RCT School of Musical Theatre provides year-round training in theatre arts for all ages. All classes are performance based. Past productions for the school include:

- A Chorus Line
- The Secret Garden
- Pippin
- Cats
- Jekyll & Hyde: The Musical
- Grease
