= Canyon Creek Christian Academy =

Location
- 2800 Custer Parkway; Richardson, Texas 75080; United States
- 32.995537°N 96.727885°W

Information
- Type: Private school
- Closed: 2017
- Principal: David Roberts
- Faculty: 21
- Grades: K-12
- Enrollment: 197 (2013-2014)
- Color
- Team name: Cougars
- Website: Archived official site

Canyon Creek Christian Academy (CCCA) was a private early education-12th grade Christian private school in Richardson, Texas. The school served families in various communities, including Richardson, Garland, and Plano. It opened in 1974. In the late 1980s many teachers and students left the school, alleging mismanagement, harassment, and interference in student affairs by the school's principal, a relative of the sponsoring church's pastor. The school fell under mismanagement once again in 2008 when David "Dave" Roberts was named Head of School. This mismanagement would not be survivable and Canyon Creek Christian Academy permanently closed on June 30, 2017.
