= Plano Symphony Orchestra =

American symphony orchestra

- Orchestra
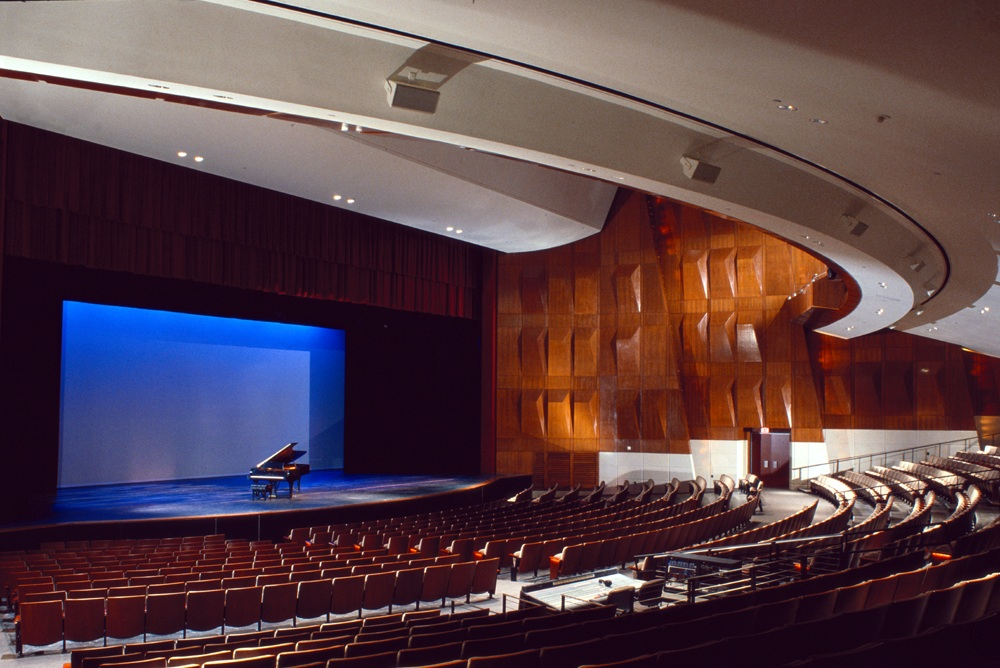
- Founded: 1983; 43 years ago
- Location: Plano, Texas, United States
- Concert hall: Robinson Fine Arts Center
- Music director: Hector Guzman
- Website: planosymphony.org

The Plano Symphony Orchestra (PSO) is an American symphony orchestra based in Plano, Texas. The orchestra is resident at the Robinson Fine Arts Center. It offers a subscription series that combines the music of traditional classical and pops series, as well as a Family Concert Series and the Collin County Young Artist Competition. In addition to its primary venue at the Robinson Fine Arts Center, the Plano Symphony performs at St. Andrew's Methodist Church as well as various venues in the surrounding area.

== History ==
The orchestra was founded in 1983 as the Plano Chamber Orchestra; its name was changed to symphony in 1998. In November 2021, the symphony received its largest-ever donation of $410,000, which will be used for various improvements including upgrading ticketing systems, creating a new strings section, and underwriting the symphony's 2022-23 40th anniversary season.

After more than 20 years performing at the Charles W. Eisemann Center for Performing Arts, the Plano Symphony moved its performances to the Robinson Fine Arts Center, a Plano ISD facility, in 2024.

Hector Guzman has served as the symphony's music director since its inception. Shira Samuels-Shragg was named as the assistant conductor in April 2022; she was succeeded in 2024 by Simón Gollo.
