= Galatyn Park station =

DART rail station in Richardson, Texas

Galatyn Park
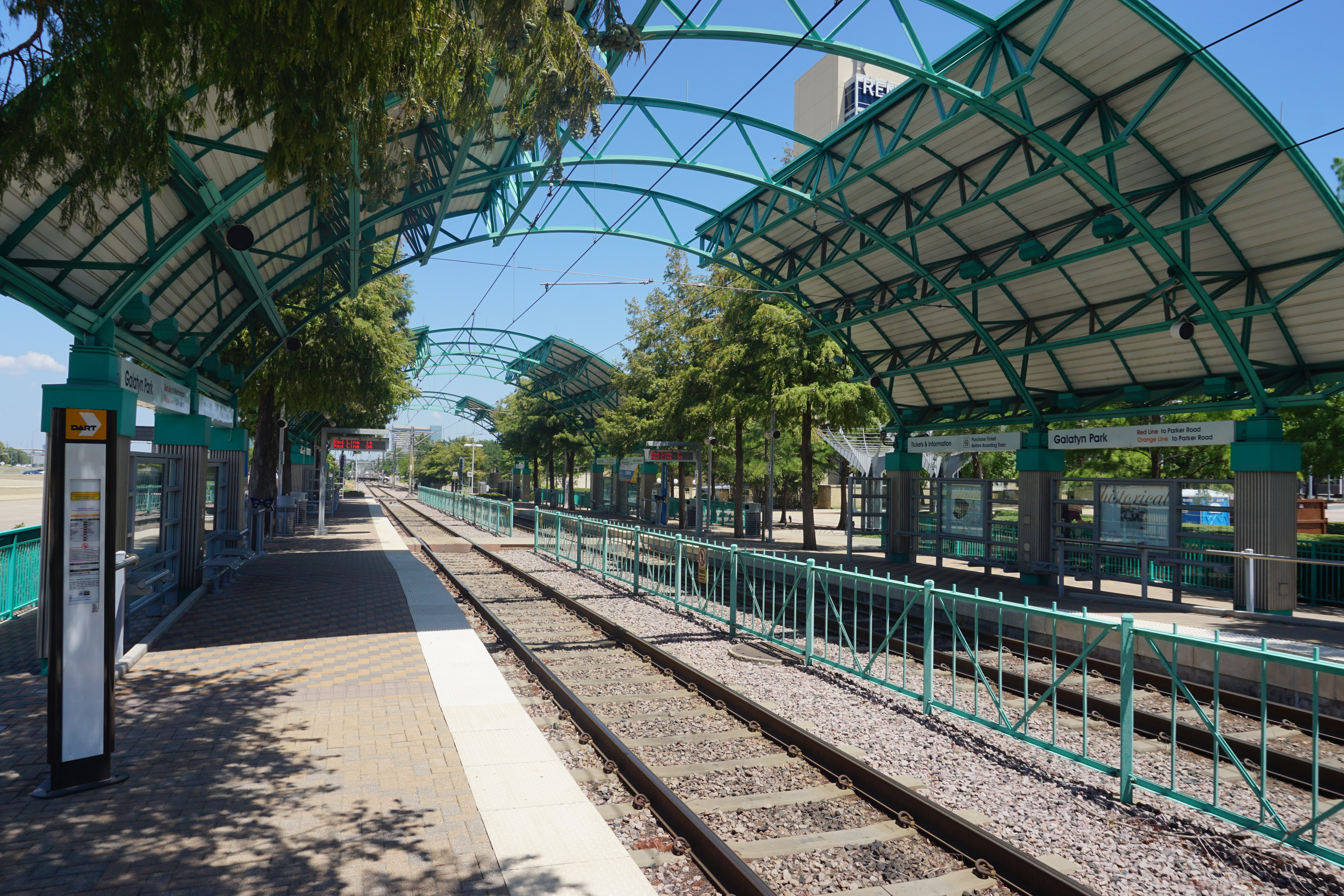
- Galatyn Park Station platform

General information
- Location: 2500 North Central Expressway; Richardson, Texas 75082
- Coordinates: 32°59′6″N 96°42′39″W
- System: DART rail
- Owner: Dallas Area Rapid Transit
- Platforms: 2 side platforms
- Connections: 408-Galatyn Park Shuttle (M-F); East Telecom GoLink Zone (M-Sun)

Construction
- Cycle facilities: two racks
- Accessible: Yes

History
- Opened: July 1, 2002

Passengers
- FY 2025: 280 (avg. weekday) ▲6.5%

Services
Preceding station	DART	Following station
Arapaho Center toward Westmoreland	Red Line	CityLine/Bush toward Parker Road
Arapaho Center toward DFW Airport Terminal A	Orange Line (peak-hour only)	CityLine/Bush toward Parker Road
Location

Galatyn Park station is a DART rail station in Richardson, Texas. The station serves the Red Line and, during peak periods, the Orange Line. It is located on a frontage road of North Central Expressway (US 75) and is named for the adjacent Galatyn Park Urban Center development.

The station is adjacent to the Charles W. Eisemann Center for Performing Arts and a portion of Richardson's Telecom Corridor, which includes offices for AT&T, Blue Cross Blue Shield of Texas, GEICO, Goldman Sachs, and CBRE Group. A shuttle bus connects to the Palisades office and residential park on the other side of US 75. A plaza adjacent to the station hosts the annual Wildflower! Arts and Music Festival.

As of the 2025 fiscal year, the station has the lowest ridership of all Red Line stations, with an average of 280 riders on weekdays, 193 riders on Saturdays, and 140 riders on Sundays.

== History ==
Initial plans for the North Central Corridor, which became the northern segment of the Red Line, included a station at Campbell Road, 3/4 mile (1.2 km) south of the modern Galatyn Park station. The Campbell Road station was not intended for the initial corridor, being deferred to a second build-out phase.

Around the same time, the city of Richardson and a private developer had proposed a 250-acre development adjacent to the rail line, Galatyn Park Urban Center. The development would contain apartments, office buildings, a hotel, and a performing arts venue. DART agreed to move the Campbell Road station to Galatyn Park and to include it in the initial build-out.

The station opened on July 1, 2002, as part of the Red Line's third major expansion. It served as the northern terminus of the line until December 9, when the line was extended to Parker Road. In tribute to the Telecom Corridor, the station was decorated with a technology theme, featuring abstract satellite dishes, bundles of steel resembling communication wires, stylized circuit boards, and panels that spell "GALATYN PARK" in Morse code, analog signal, and teletype.
