= Central centrifugal cicatricial alopecia =

- Other names: Hot comb alopecia and Follicular degeneration syndrome
- Specialty: Dermatology

Central centrifugal cicatricial alopecia (CCCA) is a type of alopecia first noticed in African Americans in the 1950s and reported by LoPresti et al. in 1968 as a result of application of petrolatum followed by a stove-heated iron comb. The original theory was that the hot petrolatum would travel down to the hair root, burn the follicle, and after repetitive injury scarring would result. Later CCCA was realized to affect men and women without a history significant for use of such styling techniques. Consequently, the terms "follicular degeneration syndrome" per Sperling and Sau in 1992 and then CCCA per Olsent et al. in 2003 were evolved. Plausible contributing factors may include other African-American styling techniques such as relaxers, tight braids, heavy extensions, certain oils, gels or pomades.

== Presentation ==
CCCA usually begins at the central (sagittal) midline of the scalp. It is symmetric and exhibits scarring as the name suggests. It involves solely the top of the scalp or may progress to Hamilton–Norwood scale Type VI or VII. Early symptoms may include pruritus, dysesthesias and tenderness. On examination the skin is thin with few follicular ostia and later in the disease the scalp may appear shiny.

== Cause ==
The mechanism of pathology of CCCA remains unknown; thus, the cause has only been postulated and not proven. CCCA is suspected to have a multi-factored cause. However, one theory involves pressure exerted on the internal root sheath leading to damage, which leads to the recruitment of inflammatory cells and the result of scarring. African Americans are found to be at increased risk. Historically, some have hypothesized that CCCA represents an end stage of traction alopecia. However, the veracity of this theory is low as many patients who have CCCA have not employed traction hairstyling.

== Histopathologic features ==
Histopathologic features include a perifollicular lymphocytic infiltrate, concentric lamellar fibrosis (layers of fibroblasts in the papillary dermis), sebaceous gland loss and premature disintegration of the internal root sheath. Additionally, granulomatous inflammation secondary to follicular rupture has been noted. Perifollicular erythema and follicular keratosis is usually absent.

== Treatment ==
Treatments for CCCA remain investigational. Altering hair care practices has not been proven to assist in hair rejuvenation. High-dose topical steroids, antibiotics, immunomodulators such as tacrolimus (Protopic) and pimecrolimus (Elidel), and anti-androgen/5alpha Reductase inhibitors have been used with unknown efficacy.

== Epidemiology ==
CCCA tends to present itself in the 20s and progresses over 20–30 years. One should consider this diagnosis in African Americans with what appears to be a female-pattern hair loss.

== Terminology ==
The terminology of CCCA has been a source of regular confusion. Recent clarifications have been made, with the term "central centrifugal cicatritial alopecia" adopted as a diagnostic category by the North American Hair Research Society. It has also been referred to as:

- Hot comb alopecia
- Follicular degeneration syndrome
- Pseudopelade in African Americans
- Central elliptical pseudopelade in Caucasians

Also in this category is cicatricial pattern hair loss (CPHL). This CCCA pattern is a potential alopecia mimic that can be confused for androgenetic alopecia. Alopecia mimics have proven a problem in establishing diagnosis of alopecia when using only clinical evaluation.

A similarly sounding term is central centrifugal scarring alopecia (CCSA). (L.C. Sperling, Central, centrifugal scarring alopecia. In: L.C. Sperling, Editor, An atlas of hair pathology with clinical correlations, Parthenon Publishing Group, New York (2003), pp. 91–100). This is a clinical finding that describes the diagnosis of some primary cicatricial alopecias as noted mainly in the central scalp, and includes CCCA, folliculitis decalvans, and any other potential centrally presenting cicatricial alopecia. This term is not often used in the literature to signify diagnostic terminology.

== See also ==
- Cicatricial alopecia
- List of cutaneous conditions
- Hot comb
