= Fair Park station =

DART rail station located in the South Dallas neighborhood of Dallas, Texas

Fair Park
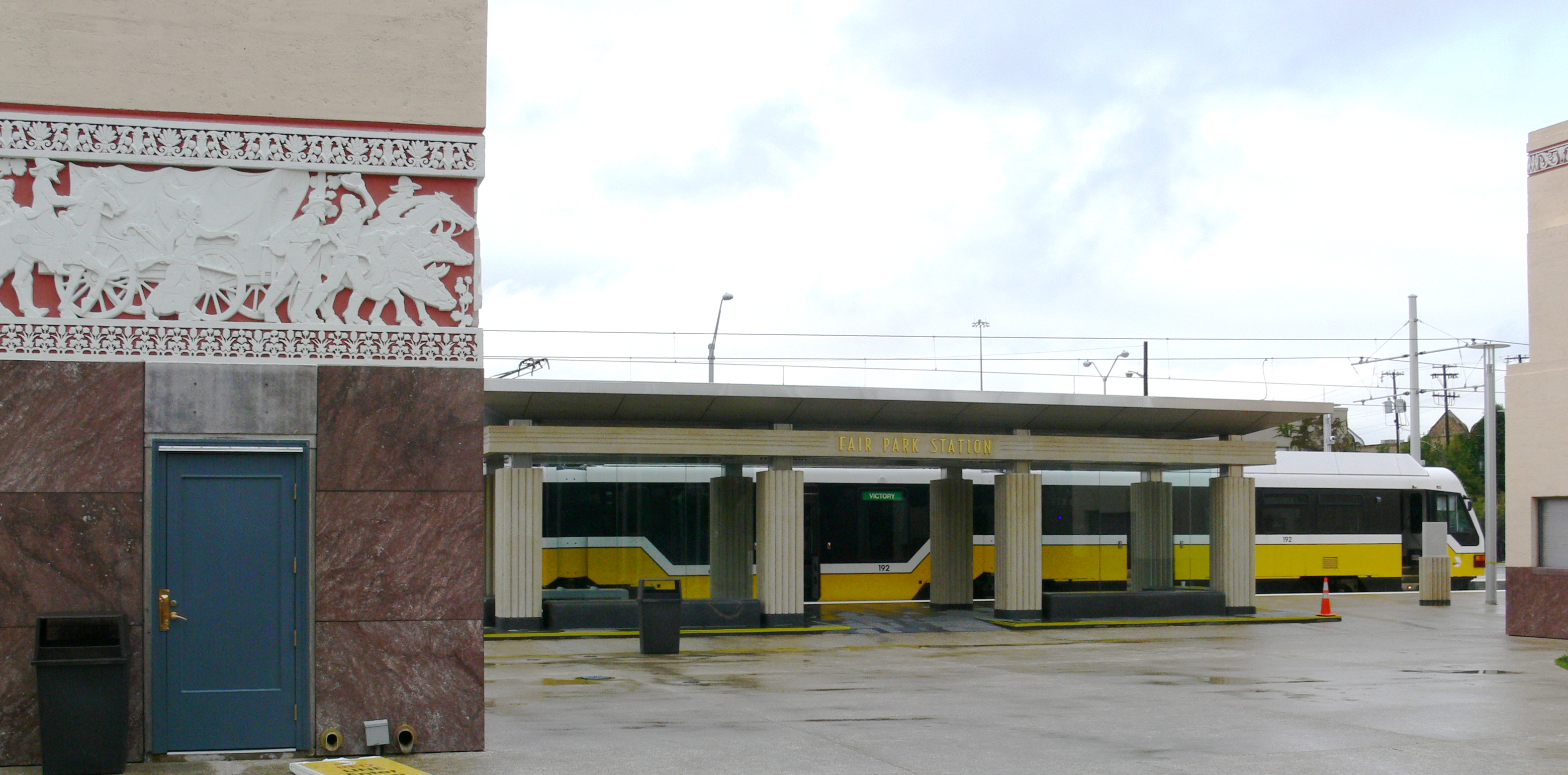

General information
- Location: 3710 Parry Avenue; Dallas, Texas
- Coordinates: 32.782062°N 96.765932°W
- System: DART rail
- Owner: Dallas Area Rapid Transit
- Platforms: 2 side platforms
- Connections: DART: 23, 214, South Dallas GoLink Zone (M-Sun)

Construction
- Structure type: At-grade
- Cycle facilities: 2 lockers, 1 rack
- Accessible: true

History
- Opened: September 14, 2009

Passengers
- FY 2025: 907 (avg. weekday) ▲3.7%

Services
Preceding station	DART	Following station
Baylor University Medical Center toward North Carrollton/Frankford	Green Line	MLK Jr. toward Buckner
Location

Fair Park station is a DART rail station located in the South Dallas neighborhood of Dallas, Texas. The station is on the Green Line and serves Fair Park, which is home to the annual State Fair of Texas and the Cotton Bowl stadium.

== Station ==
The station is located on the eastern side of Parry Avenue and consists of two side platforms with two passenger shelters on each side. The westernmost gate of Fair Park is directly adjacent to the station. Northbound buses board from the rail station, while southbound buses board from a bus shelter across the street.

The architecture of the station's shelters is notably distinct from all other DART rail stations, boasting an Art Deco aesthetic with limestone columns and granite benches. The design, created by Brad and Diana Goldberg, is based on the ticket booths that were constructed for the 1936 Texas Centennial Exposition. In 2010, the station (alongside fellow Green Line art piece The Traveling Man) was one of 40 projects included in the annual Public Art Year in Review by Americans for the Arts.

== Service ==
The station is serviced by the Green Line, which typically runs trains every 20 minutes. During important events such as the state fair, additional Green Line trains run between Victory and Lawnview, decreasing the headways to 10-minute intervals. The station can also be serviced by special-event Red Line trains, which connect Fair Park to the northern segment of the Red Line; this is typically reserved for the day of the Red River Showdown, which is the busiest day of the fair.

The eastern entrance to DART's Central Rail Operating Facility is connected to the rail network between the Fair Park and MLK Jr. stations. Northbound trains leaving the rail yard start at Fair Park, and southbound trains leaving the rail network make their final stop at Fair Park.

== History ==
The Parry Avenue entrance of Fair Park was historically a stop on Dallas's streetcar network. At its height, the line contained four sets of tracks.

In 1997, DART began preliminary studies for light rail service to the South Dallas area, including Fair Park, which would be opened between 2003 and 2008. However, the project was delayed due to debates regarding the Deep Ellum and Love Field stations on the line. Construction of the line ultimately began in June 2006 with a planned completion date of 2009. Construction was temporarily halted during the 2007 and 2008 fair seasons.

Fair Park station opened on September 14, 2009 as part of the first phase of the Green Line, which stretched from Victory to MLK Jr. When the state fair opened two weeks later on September 25, a small ceremony was held at the station to commemorate the new service.
