= Northwest Dallas =

- Nickname: Westhollow
- Location in Dallas
- Country: United States
- State: Texas
- Counties: Dallas
- City: Dallas
- Elevation: 420 ft (130 m)
- ZIP codes: 75207, 75220, 75229, 75234, 75235, 75247
- Area codes: 214, 469, 972

Northwest Dallas is an area consisting of many communities and neighborhoods in Dallas, Texas, (USA).

== Geography ==
The area is bordered by I-635 to the North, Stemmons Freeway to the West, the Dallas North Tollway to the East and to the South it goes to the junction of I-35E and the Dallas North Tollway. There are a number of residential and commercial neighborhoods in Northwest Dallas. Of particular note are Love Field, home of Dallas Love Field airport, and the Stemmons Corridor, a stretch of hotels and office towers along Interstate 35E. The Asian Trade District is located just south of the I-35E/I-635 junction.

Northwest Dallas is also home to Bachman Lake, a small freshwater lake, fed by the Bachman Branch of the Trinity River.

== Government ==
The Federal Bureau of Investigation Dallas Field Office is in Northwest Dallas.

== Education ==
The Dallas Independent School District serves Northwest Dallas.

DISD operates the Alfred J. Loos Athletic Complex in Addison, near Northwest Dallas.

== Transportation ==
=== Trains ===
==== Light rail ====
- DART: Orange Line and Green Line listed south to north
  - Medical/Market Center Station
  - Southwestern Medical District/Parkland Station
  - Inwood Station
  - Love Field Station
  - Burbank Station
  - Bachman Station
- DART: Green Line only listed south to north
  - Walnut Hill/Denton Station
  - Royal Lane Station

=== Highways ===
- Interstate 35E
- Interstate 635
