= Pearl/Arts District station =

DART rail station in Dallas, Texas

Pearl/Arts District
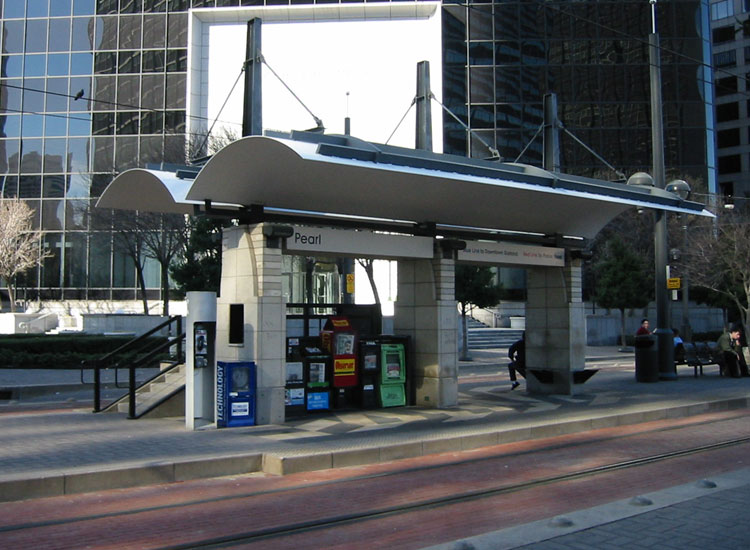
- Pearl/Arts District station platform

General information
- Location: 2200 Bryan Street; Dallas, Texas
- Coordinates: 32°47′11″N 96°47′40″W
- System: DART rail
- Owner: Dallas Area Rapid Transit
- Platforms: Island platform
- Tracks: 2
- Connections: DART: 1, 3, 237 (SB only); 9 routes at nearby East Transfer Center

Construction
- Structure type: At-grade
- Accessible: Yes

History
- Opened: June 14, 1996
- Former names: Pearl

Passengers
- FY 2025: 4,378 (avg. weekday) ▲3.1%

Services
Preceding station	DART	Following station
St. Paul toward UNT Dallas	Blue Line	Cityplace/Uptown toward Downtown Rowlett
St. Paul toward North Carrollton/Frankford	Green Line	Deep Ellum toward Buckner
St. Paul toward DFW Airport Terminal A	Orange Line	Cityplace/Uptown toward LBJ/Central or Parker Road
St. Paul toward Westmoreland	Red Line	Cityplace/Uptown toward Parker Road
Location

Pearl/Arts District station (formerly Pearl station) is a DART rail station in Downtown Dallas, Texas. Located in the median of Bryan Street on the east side of its intersection with Pearl Street, the station serves the City Center District and Arts District, including the Plaza of the Americas, the Sheraton Dallas Hotel, the Majestic Theatre, the Dallas Arts Tower, the Morton H. Meyerson Symphony Center, and the AT&T Performing Arts Center.

The station serves all four of the system's light rail lines (Red, Blue, Green, and Orange), as well as 9 bus routes at the nearby East Transfer Center. It is the easternmost station to be served by all four lines, as well as the easternmost station in Downtown Dallas proper. From the station, the Red, Blue, and Orange Lines continue north into a tunnel under North Central Expressway (US 75), while the Green Line continues eastward under Interstate 345 towards Deep Ellum and Pleasant Grove.

== History ==
Pearl station was an inaugural DART rail station, opening with the Red and Blue lines on June 14, 1996. It served as the northern terminus of both lines until they were extended in 1997 and 1999, respectively.

On July 30, 2012, Pearl station was renamed to Pearl/Arts District station to emphasize its proximity to the Arts District.
