= Baylor University Medical Center station =

DART rail station in the Deep Ellum neighborhood of Dallas, Texas

Baylor University Medical Center
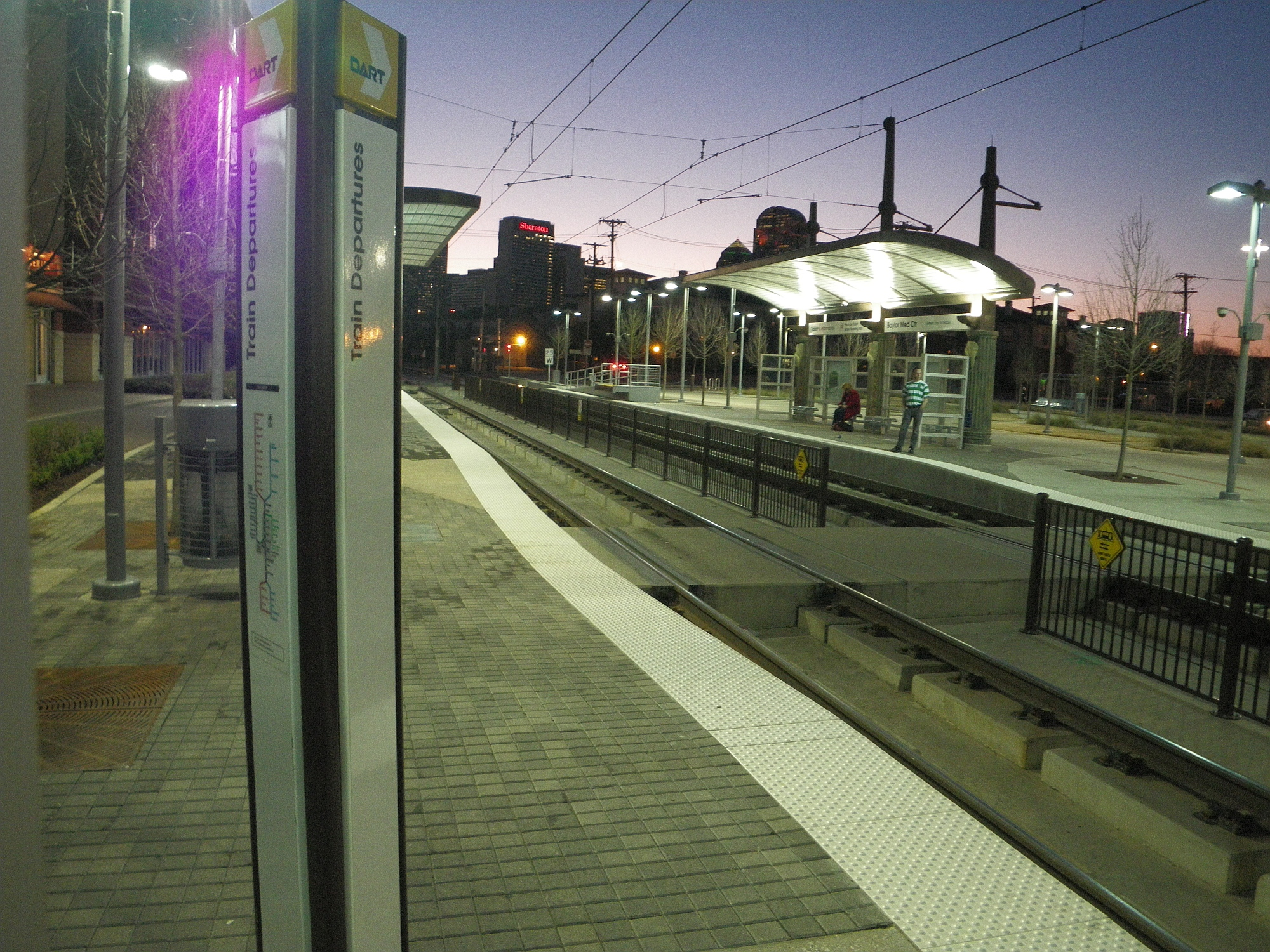

General information
- Location: 2900 Junius Street; Dallas, Texas
- Coordinates: 32.786509°N 96.782068°W
- System: DART rail
- Owner: Dallas Area Rapid Transit
- Platforms: 2 side platforms
- Connections: DART: 1, 9, 18; Baylor campus shuttle

Construction
- Structure type: At-grade
- Cycle facilities: 2 lockers, 1 rack
- Accessible: Yes

History
- Opened: September 14, 2009

Passengers
- FY 2025: 828 (avg. weekday) ▼9.8%

Services
Preceding station	DART	Following station
Deep Ellum toward North Carrollton/Frankford	Green Line	Fair Park toward Buckner
Location

Baylor University Medical Center station (shortened to Baylor Medical Center station or Baylor station) is a DART rail station in the Deep Ellum neighborhood of Dallas, Texas. Located at an outdoor plaza east of Malcolm X Boulevard, the station serves eastern Deep Ellum and the Baylor University Medical Center complex. It is served by the Green Line.

The station opened on September 14, 2009, as part of the first phase of the Green Line, which stretched from Victory to MLK Jr.
