= Hatcher station =

DART rail station located in Dallas, Texas

Hatcher
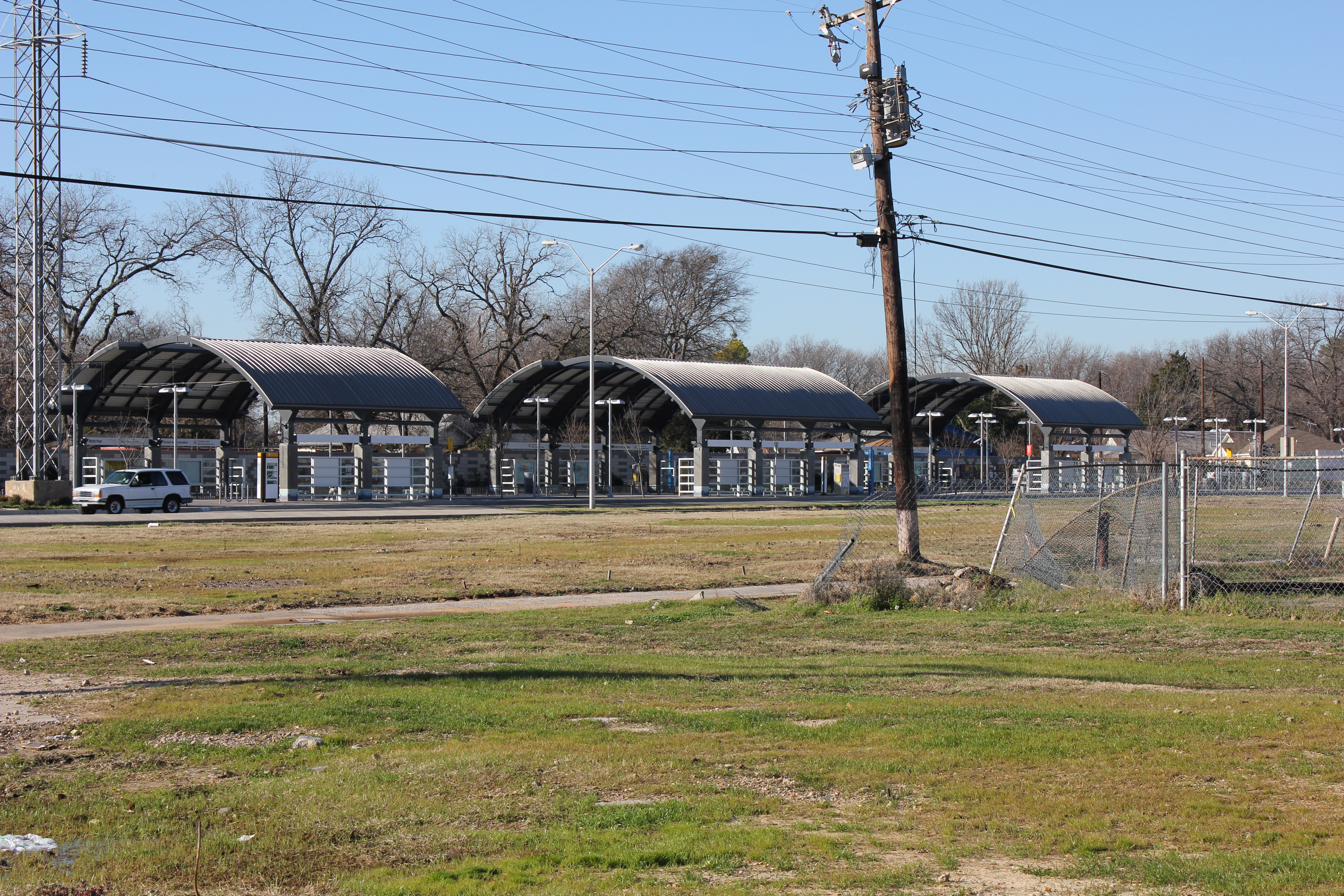

General information
- Location: 4003 Elsie Faye Heggins St; Dallas, Texas 75210
- Coordinates: 32°45′59″N 96°44′32″W
- System: DART rail
- Owner: Dallas Area Rapid Transit
- Platforms: 2 side platforms
- Connections: DART: 13 216, South Dallas GoLink Zone (M-Sun)

Construction
- Structure type: At-grade
- Parking: no
- Accessible: Yes

History
- Opened: December 6, 2010

Services
Preceding station	DART	Following station
MLK Jr. toward North Carrollton/Frankford	Green Line	Lawnview toward Buckner
Location

Hatcher station is a DART rail station located in Dallas, Texas. It serves the Green Line. The station opened as part of the Green Line's expansion in December 2010.

DART owns several vacant lots next to the station that are planned to be used as a community garden for urban farming.
