= Farmers Branch station =

DART rail station in Farmers Branch, Texas

Farmers Branch
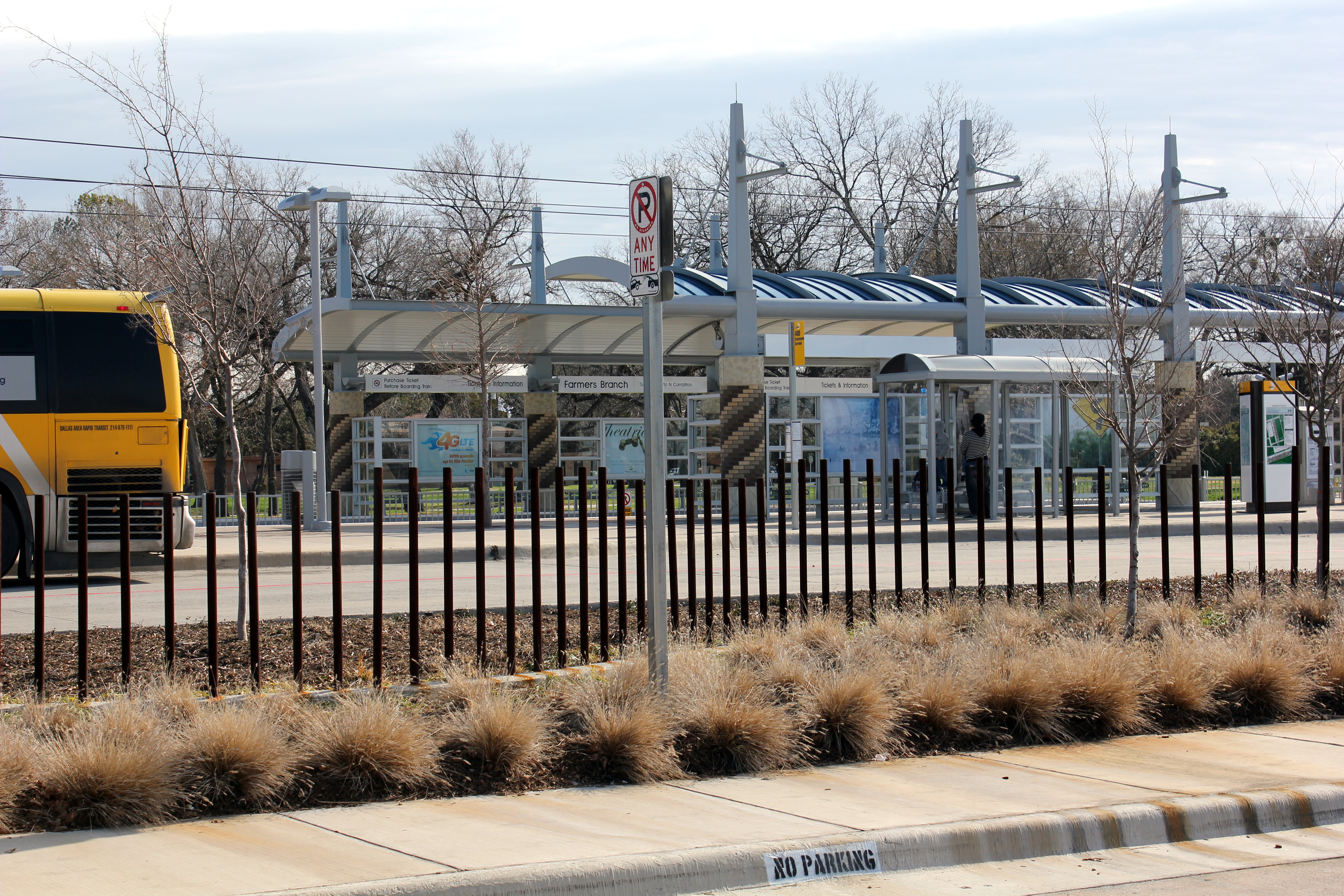

General information
- Location: 12800 Denton Drive; Farmers Branch, Texas 75234
- Coordinates: 32°55′19″N 96°53′46″W
- System: DART rail
- Owner: Dallas Area Rapid Transit
- Platforms: 2 side platforms
- Connections: DART Routes 227 and 233; Farmers Branch GoLink Zone (M-F)

Construction
- Structure type: At grade
- Parking: 237 spaces
- Accessible: Yes

History
- Opened: December 6, 2010

Services
Preceding station	DART	Following station
Downtown Carrollton toward North Carrollton/Frankford	Green Line	Royal Lane toward Buckner
Location

Farmers Branch station (formerly Farmers Branch Park & Ride) is a DART rail station in Farmers Branch, Texas. It serves the Green Line. The station initially opened as a bus-only park & ride facility in the 1990s. Light rail platforms opened as part of the Green Line's expansion in December 2010.
