= Parkdale Heights, Dallas =

Neighborhood in Dallas, Texas, USA

Parkdale
- Neighborhood
- Nickname: Parkdale Heights
- Interactive map of Parkdale
- Coordinates: 32°46′19.11″N 96°43′12.29″W
- Country: United States
- State: Texas
- County: Dallas
- City: Dallas
- Area: East Dallas
- Elevation: 458 ft (140 m)
- ZIP code: 75227
- Area codes: 214, 469, 972

Parkdale Heights is a neighborhood in east Dallas, Texas (USA). The official name for the neighborhood is Parkdale, the neighborhood was established in 1926. It is bounded on the west by railroad tracks (just east of Hatcher Street), on the northwest by railroad tracks, on the north by Military Parkway, on the east by Bisbee Drive and on the south by Scyene Road.

Parkdale Lake is located within the neighborhood.

== Transportation ==
Dallas Area Rapid Transit's Green Line has a station adjacent to the neighborhood — Lawnview Station, south across Scyene Road at Lawnview Avenue.

== Education ==
The neighborhood is served by the Dallas Independent School District. As of 2007, children in the neighborhood attend Ascher Silberstein Elementary School, Pearl C. Anderson Middle Learning Center, and Lincoln High School.

The neighborhood is nearby the Eastfield College campus of the Dallas County Community College District.
