= St. Paul station (DART) =

DART rail station in Dallas

St. Paul
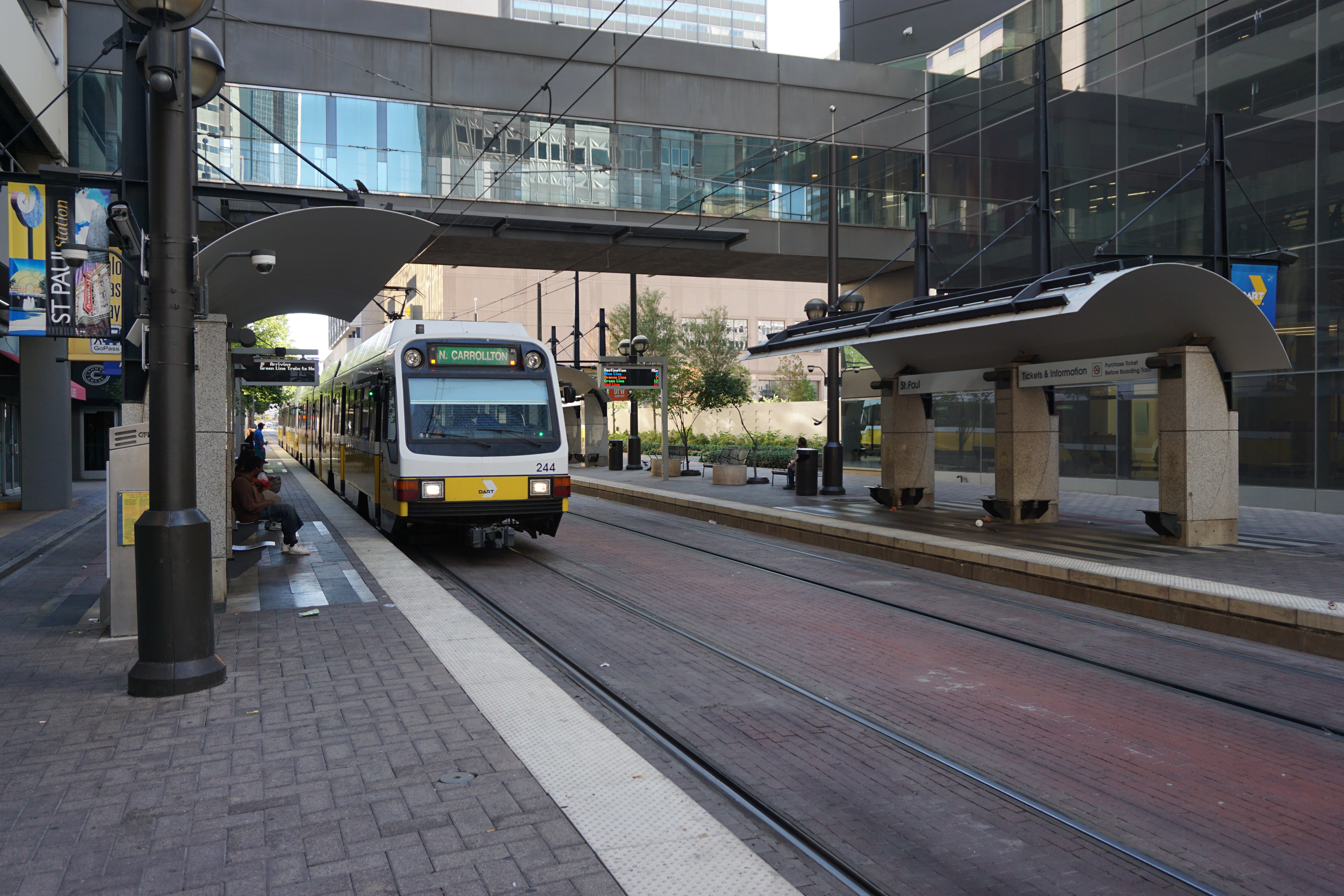
- A Green Line train at St. Paul station in 2015

General information
- Location: Bryan Street, between St. Paul and Harwood streets Dallas, Texas
- Coordinates: 32°47′03″N 96°47′49″W
- System: DART rail
- Owner: Dallas Area Rapid Transit
- Platforms: 2 side platforms
- Tracks: 2
- Connections: DART: 207, 308; M-Line Trolley

Construction
- Structure type: At-grade
- Accessible: Yes

History
- Opened: June 14, 1996

Passengers
- FY 2025: 2,922 (avg. weekday) ▼3.7%

Services
Preceding station	DART	Following station
Akard toward UNT Dallas	Blue Line	Pearl/Arts District toward Downtown Rowlett
Akard toward North Carrollton/Frankford	Green Line	Pearl/Arts District toward Buckner
Akard toward DFW Airport Terminal A	Orange Line	Pearl/Arts District toward LBJ/Central or Parker Road
Akard toward Westmoreland	Red Line	Pearl/Arts District toward Parker Road
Location

St. Paul station is a DART rail station in Dallas, Texas. It is located on Bryan Street, between St. Paul and Harwood Streets, near the Arts District in Downtown Dallas. It opened on June 14, 1996, and is a station on the Red Line, Orange Line, Green Line and Blue Line, serving the Trammell Crow Center, the Dallas Museum of Art, the Nasher Sculpture Center, Patriot Tower and First Baptist Church.

St. Paul station takes its name from its namesake street, which received its name in the 1930s, not out of religious interest, but as a protest against the Volstead Act, a national law that banned alcoholic beverages. The city fathers located a passage in the Bible, attributed to St. Paul, that said "drink a little wine, for your stomach's sake".
