= Lake June station =

DART rail station in Dallas, Texas

Lake June
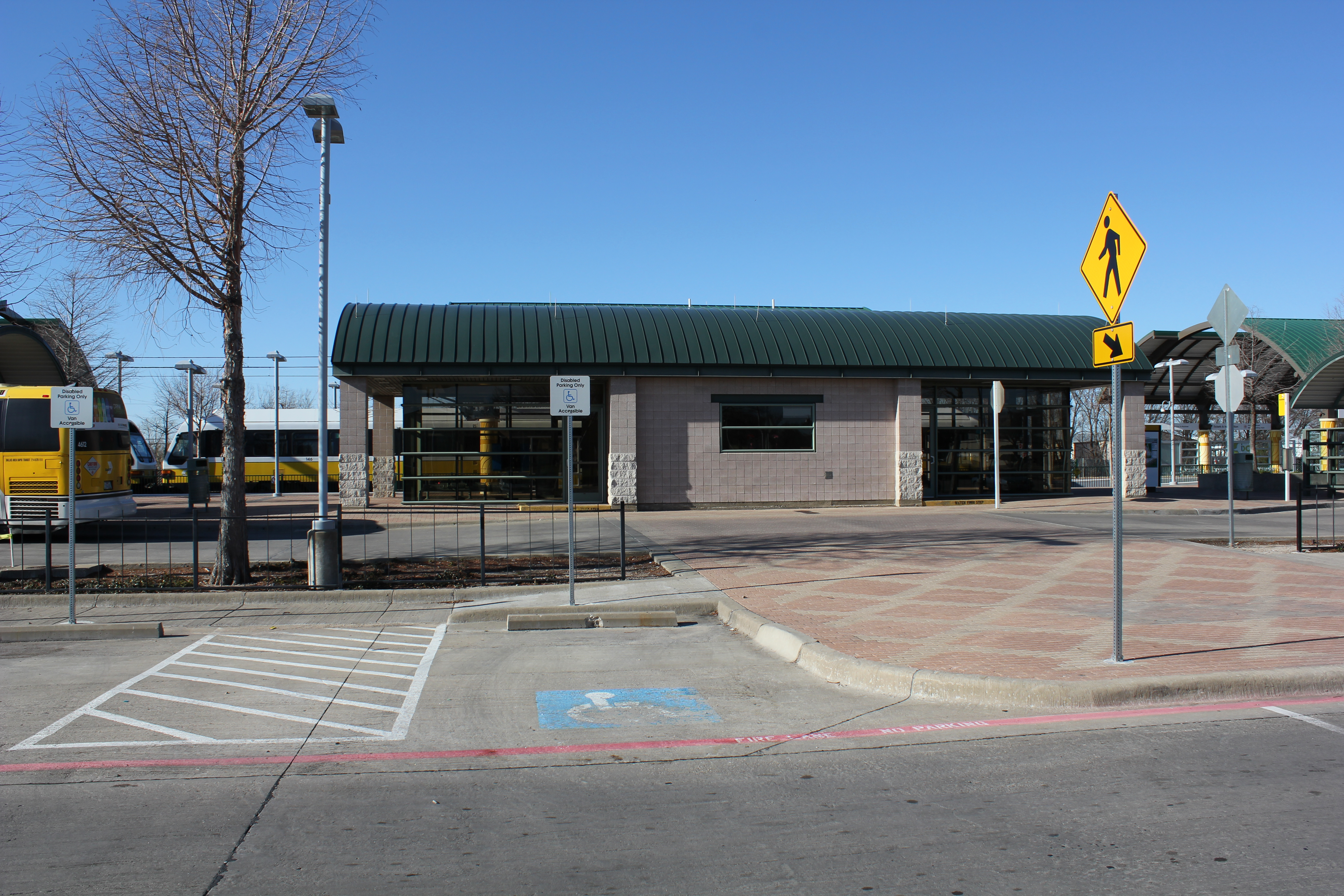

General information
- Location: 6410 Lake June Road; Dallas, TX 75217
- Coordinates: 32°43′57″N 96°42′34″W
- Owner: Dallas Area Rapid Transit
- Platforms: 2 side platforms
- Connections: DART: 30 218; Kleberg GoLink Zone (M-Sun), Rylie GoLink Zone (M-Sun)

Construction
- Structure type: At-grade
- Parking: 472 spaces
- Accessible: Yes

History
- Opened: February 25, 2002 (bus); December 6, 2010 (rail)

Services
Preceding station	DART	Following station
Lawnview toward North Carrollton/Frankford	Green Line	Buckner Terminus
Location

Lake June station is an intermodal transit station in Dallas, Texas. It serves DART rail's Green Line and bus routes for the Pleasant Grove neighborhood.

The station opened on February 25, 2002 as Lake June Transit Center, a bus-only facility. It replaced a park-and-ride at Pleasant Grove Stadium. It was connected to the rail network on December 6, 2010 as part of the Green Line's second construction phase.

Because of its origin as a bus transfer facility, Lake June is one of the few DART rail stations to have an air-conditioned waiting area and public restrooms.
