= MLK Jr. station (DART) =

DART light rail station in Dallas, Texas

MLK Jr.
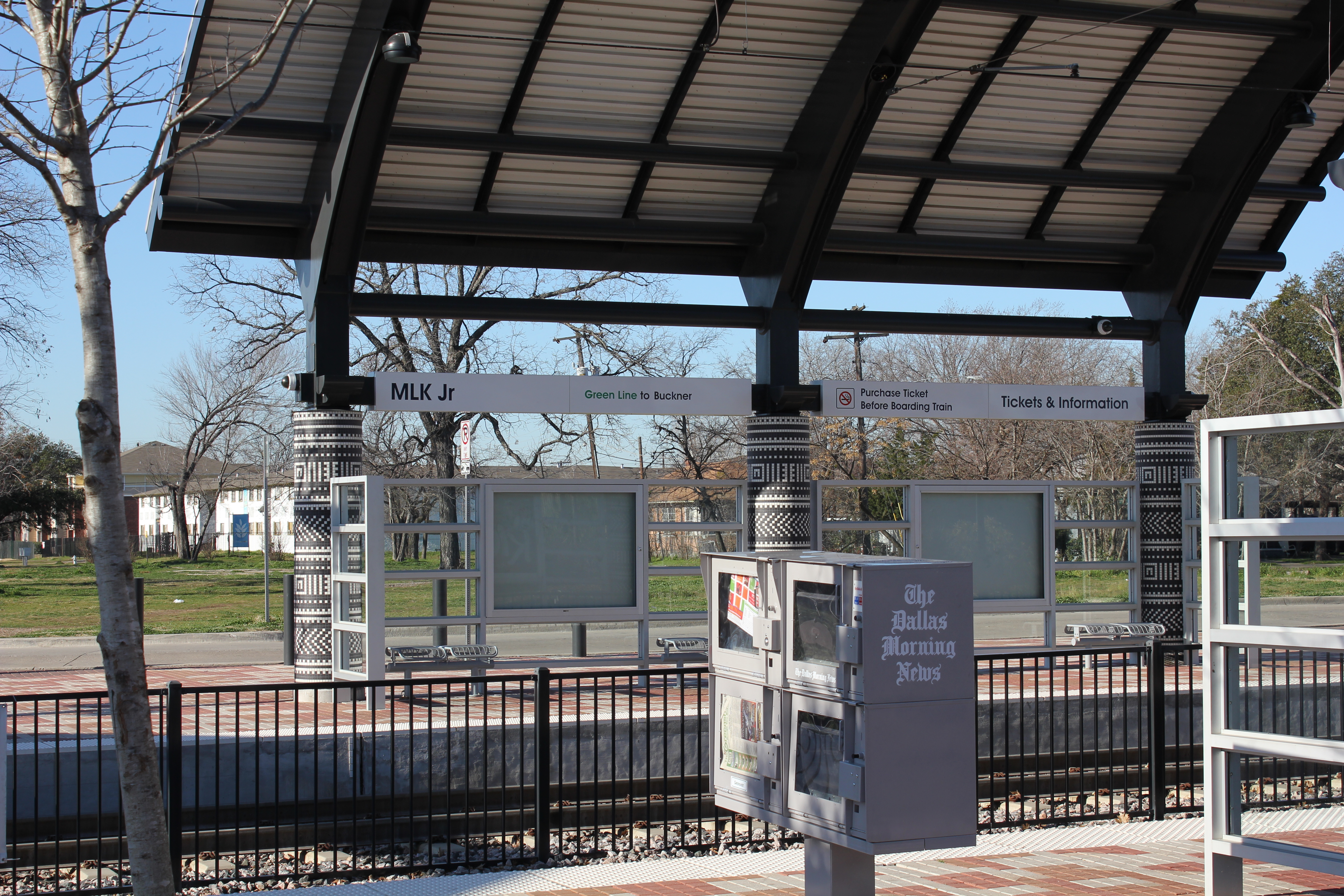

General information
- Location: 1412 South Trunk Avenue; Dallas, TX 75210
- Coordinates: 32.773754°N 96.764575°W
- System: DART rail
- Platforms: 2 side platforms
- Tracks: 2
- Connections: DART: 13, 23, 104, 216, South Dallas GoLink Zone (M-Sun)

Construction
- Parking: 200 spaces
- Accessible: Yes

History
- Opened: February 21, 2005 (bus); September 14, 2009 (rail)

Passengers
- FY 2025: 1,293 (avg. weekday) ▼4.4%

Services
Preceding station	DART	Following station
Fair Park toward North Carrollton/Frankford	Green Line	Hatcher toward Buckner
Location

Martin Luther King, Jr. Station at J.B. Jackson, Jr. Transit Center is an intermodal public transit facility in Dallas, Texas operated by Dallas Area Rapid Transit. The facility is situated in South Dallas, where it serves the Green Line, four bus routes, and a curb-to-curb transit zone.

On maps and schedules, the facility is typically treated as two separate stations, with the light rail portion referred to as MLK Jr. station and the bus portion referred to as J.B. Jackson Jr. Transit Center.

== Location ==
MLK Jr. station is located at the intersection of Martin Luther King Jr. Boulevard and South Trunk Avenue. The area's largest attraction is Fair Park, the home of the State Fair of Texas, which is two blocks north of MLK Jr. station. A number of small businesses and public facilities are in the vicinity of the station.

=== Transit-oriented development ===
As with other DART stations, particularly within the inner sections of Dallas, the City of Dallas has encouraged transit-oriented development in station-proximate parcels to boost economic development. MLK Jr. is one of the City's five prime targets for encouraging mixed-use development near DART; the station area plan released in February 2013 aims to focus growth in an "urban mixed-use area" encompassing vacant lots directly south of the station as well as designating Grand Avenue, Martin Luther King Junior Boulevard and Robert B Cullum Boulevard as corridors to upgrade to complete streets or secondary streetscape areas.

== History ==
J.B. Jackson, Jr. Transit Center was opened as a bus-only station on February 21, 2005. The station was named for J.B. Jackson, Jr. Boulevard, which in turn was named after a community leader and founding member of the DART executive board.

The light rail portion of the station, named for Martin Luther King, Jr. Boulevard, opened on September 14, 2009. It served as the southern terminus for the Green Line until it was extended to Buckner on December 6, 2010.

== Artwork ==
In tribute to the largely-African-American population of South Dallas, the station's artwork draws from both African culture and Dallas history. The columns and floor use patterns inspired by Kuba textiles, and two seventeen-foot talking drums flank the entrance to the rail station. The rail station's windscreens contain R.C. Hickman photographs depicting the Civil Rights Movement in Dallas. Between the bus and rail stations is a "Walk of Respect" commemorating local community leaders.
