= Deep Ellum station =

DART rail station in Dallas, Texas

Deep Ellum
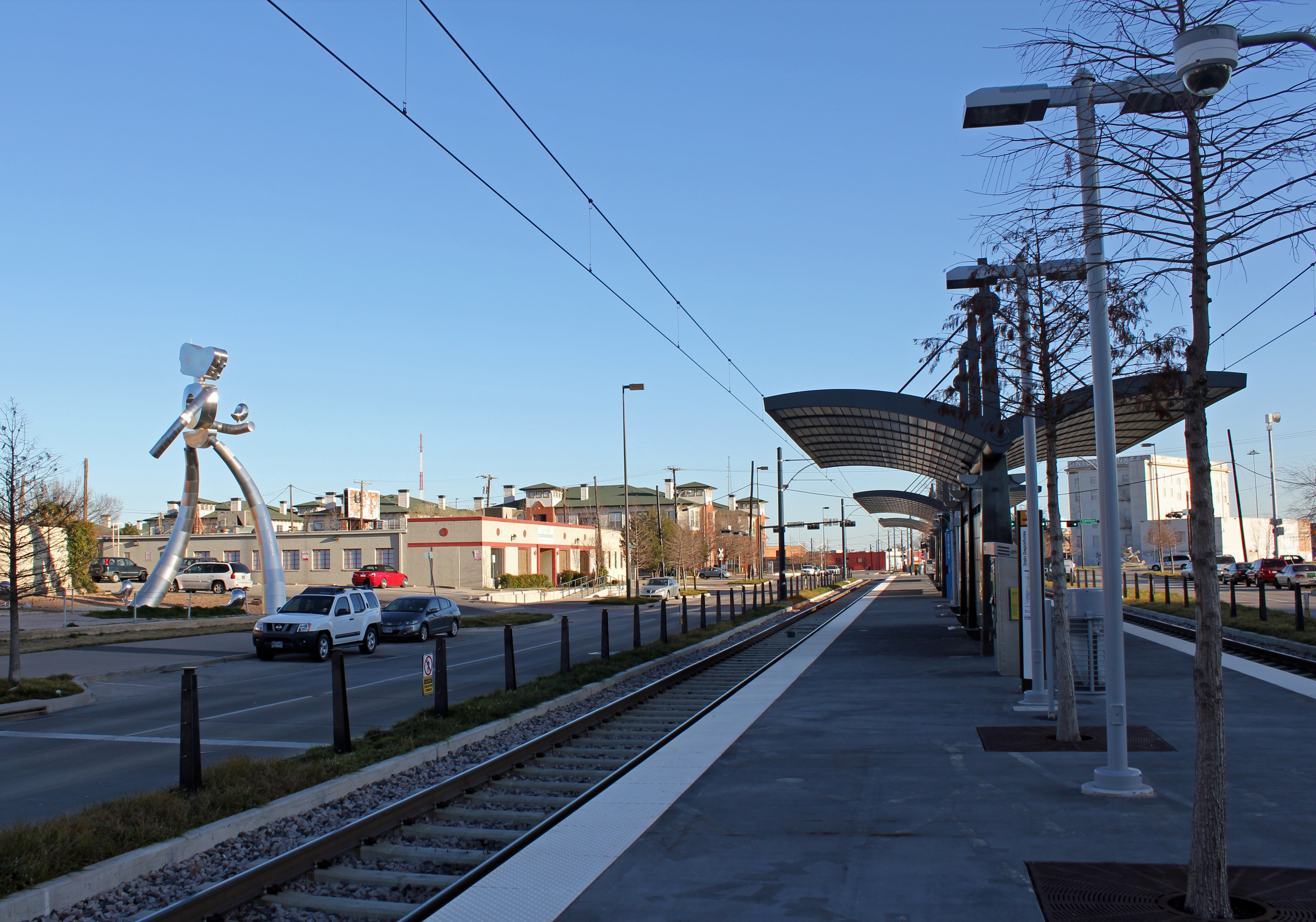
- The station in January, 2012

General information
- Location: 450 North Good-Latimer Expressway; Dallas, Texas 75226
- Coordinates: 32.785833°N 96.7885°W
- System: DART rail
- Owner: Dallas Area Rapid Transit
- Platforms: Island platform
- Connections: DART: 1, 9, 18

Construction
- Structure type: At-grade
- Accessible: Yes

History
- Opened: September 14, 2009

Services
Preceding station	DART	Following station
Pearl/Arts District toward North Carrollton/Frankford	Green Line	Baylor University Medical Center toward Buckner
Location

Deep Ellum station is a DART rail station located in Dallas, Texas. It is located near the Deep Ellum neighborhood and serves the DART Green Line. The station opened on September 14, 2009 as one of four original stops on the line.

== Traveling Man sculptures ==
Deep Ellum station is also home to a three-part stainless steel sculpture series called The Traveling Man created by Brandon Oldenburg of Deep Ellum's own Reel FX Creative Studios and Brad Oldham of Dallas-based Brad Oldham Inc. The three sculptures are located at different intersections in Deep Ellum. The first is at Good Latimer between Swiss Ave. and Miranda, directly across from the station. The second is at the corner of Gaston and Good Latimer. The third is at the corner of Good Latimer and Elm Street.
