= Asian Trade District, Dallas =

Coordinates: 32.895°N 96.891°W

Asian Trade District
- Interactive map of Asian Trade District
- Country: United States
- State: Texas
- Counties: Dallas
- City: Dallas
- Area: Northwest Dallas
- ZIP code: 75229
- Area codes: 214, 469, 972

The Asian Trade District (ATD) is a neighborhood in Northwest Dallas, Texas (USA). Located at the crossroads of Harry Hines Boulevard and Royal Lane, the district has been home to numerous Asian-owned businesses, wholesale retailers, and restaurants since the 1980s. The area is recognized as the city's Koreatown, and has been designated as a special district since 1999. With the arrival of Royal Lane station on the DART Green Line in 2010, the area has become increasingly connected to the metropolitan area.

The Asian Trade District includes over 21 shopping centers with more than 300 retailers. In August 2023, Asian grocer H Mart began renovating a building on Royal Lane that will feature a new grocery store and additional retail and office space.

== Transportation ==
=== Highways ===
- Interstate 35E (Stemmons Freeway)

=== Trains ===
- DART: Green Line
  - Royal Lane station

== See also ==
- Chinatown, Houston
- East Chinatown, Houston
- Richardson, Texas, DFW's Chinatown
- Spring Branch, Houston, Houston's Koreatown
