= Royal Lane station =

DART rail station in Dallas, Texas

Royal Lane
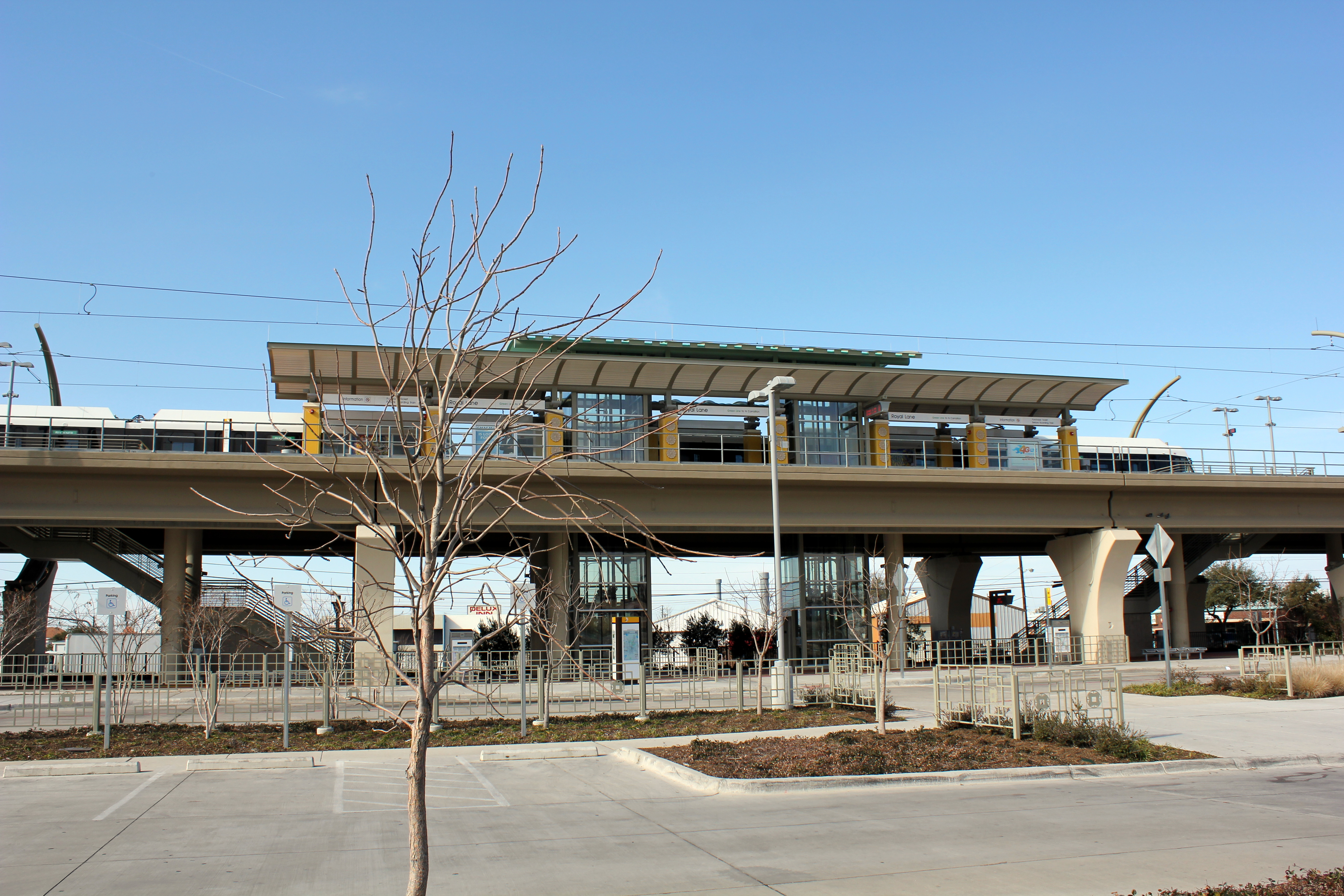

General information
- Location: 11310 Denton Drive; Dallas, Texas 75229
- Coordinates: 32°53′46″N 96°53′18″W
- System: DART rail
- Owner: Dallas Area Rapid Transit
- Platforms: Island platform
- Connections: DART: 233, North Central Dallas GoLink Zone (M-Sun), North Dallas GoLink Zone (M-Sun), Northwest Dallas GoLink Zone (M-F), Preston Hollow GoLink Zone (M-Sun)

Construction
- Structure type: Elevated
- Parking: 354 spaces
- Accessible: Yes

History
- Opened: December 6, 2010

Services
Preceding station	DART	Following station
Farmers Branch toward North Carrollton/Frankford	Green Line	Walnut Hill/Denton toward Buckner
Location

Royal Lane station is a DART rail station in Dallas, Texas. It is located in Northwest Dallas and serves the Green Line. The station opened as part of the Green Line's expansion in December 2010. It serves nearby attractions such as the Asian Trade District.
