= Walnut Hill/Denton station =

DART rail station in Dallas, Texas

Walnut Hill/Denton
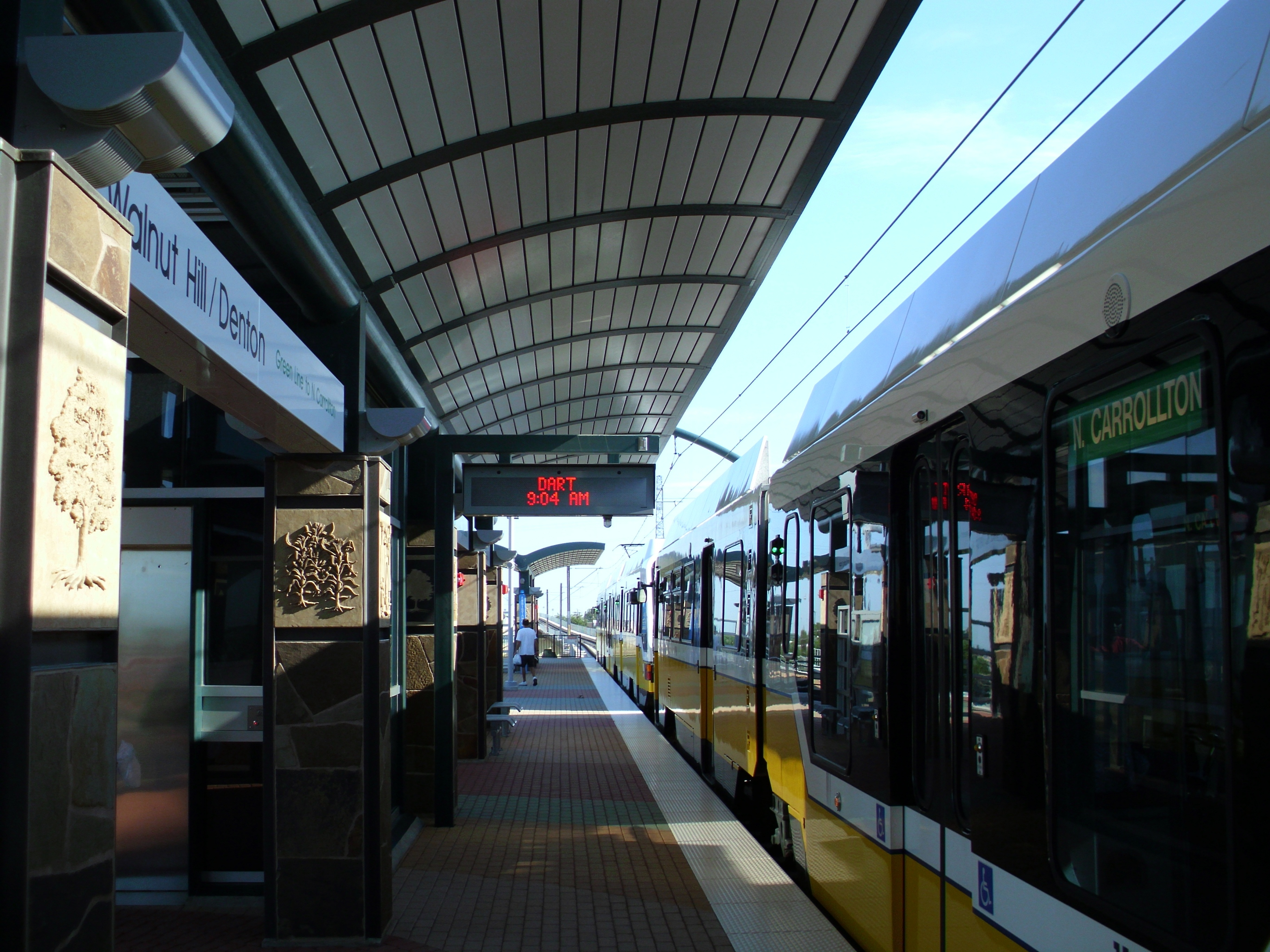
- Green Line train departing from Walnut Hill/Denton station.

General information
- Location: 2815 Walnut Hill Lane; Dallas, TX 75229
- Coordinates: 32°52′53″N 96°53′02″W
- System: DART rail
- Owner: Dallas Area Rapid Transit
- Platforms: Island platform

Construction
- Structure type: Elevated
- Parking: 361 spaces
- Accessible: Yes

History
- Opened: December 6, 2010

Services
Preceding station	DART	Following station
Royal Lane toward North Carrollton/Frankford	Green Line	Bachman toward Buckner
Location

Walnut Hill/Denton station is a DART rail station in Dallas, Texas. It is located in Northwest Dallas and serves DART's Green Line. The station opened as part of the Green Line's expansion in December 2010.
