= Lawnview station =

DART rail station in southeastern Dallas, Texas

Lawnview
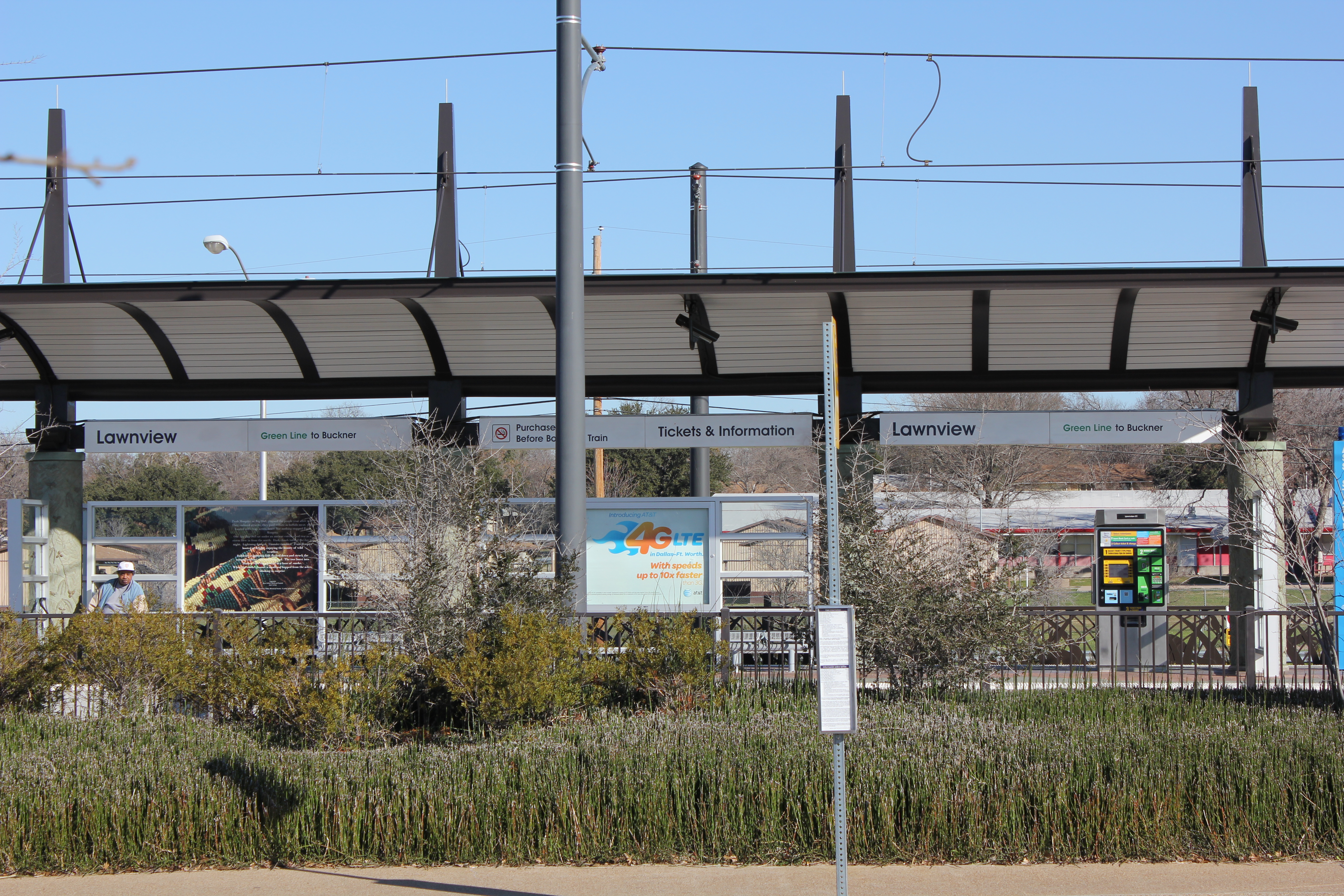

General information
- Location: 5900 Scyene Road; Dallas, Texas
- Coordinates: 32°45′56″N 96°43′08″W
- System: DART rail
- Owner: Dallas Area Rapid Transit
- Platforms: Island platform
- Tracks: 2 + 1 through track
- Connections: DART: 218, 220; STARNow Mesquite (M-Sat)

Construction
- Structure type: At-grade
- Parking: 370 spaces
- Cycle facilities: 2 lockers, 1 rack
- Accessible: Yes

History
- Opened: December 6, 2010

Passengers
- FY 2025: 547 (avg. weekday) ▼4.7%

Services
Preceding station	DART	Following station
Hatcher toward North Carrollton/Frankford	Green Line	Lake June toward Buckner
Location

Lawnview station is a DART rail station in southeastern Dallas, Texas. It is located in the Parkdale Heights neighborhood at the intersection of Lawnview Avenue and Scyene Road (SH 352).

The station is served by the Green Line and two bus routes. During major events such as the State Fair of Texas, DART runs special-event trains between Victory station and Lawnview, with a pocket track east of Lawnview used for vehicle turnarounds.

The station is also served by STARNow Mesquite, a microtransit service operated by STAR Transit in nearby Mesquite. During peak commute times, STARNow provides hourly service between Lawnview station and Hanby Stadium; outside of these hours, transit between Lawnview and Mesquite is available upon request.

The station opened on December 6, 2010 as part of the Green Line's second phase.
