= STAR Transit (Texas) =

Transit agency in Texas, United States

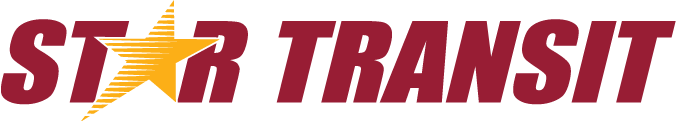

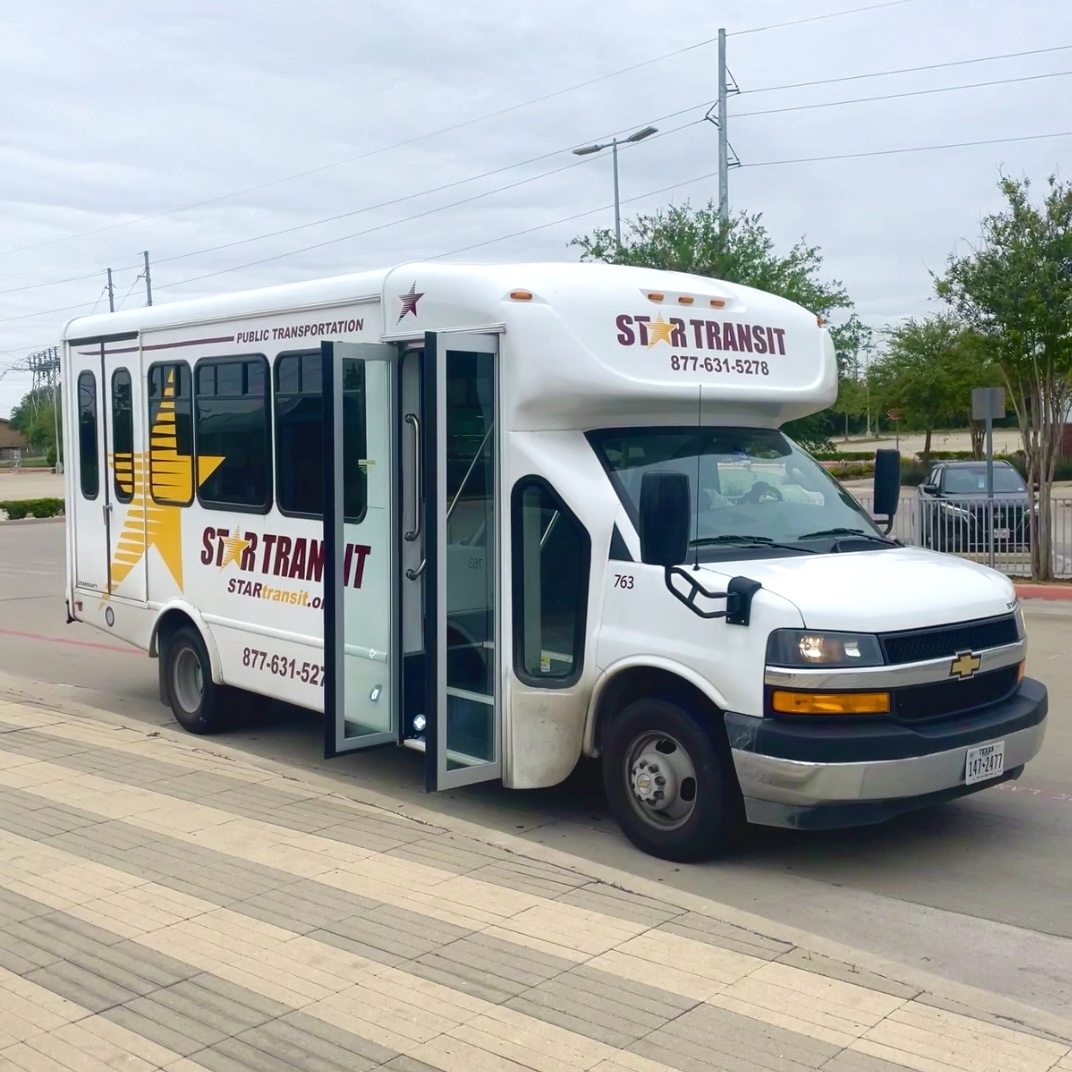
- A STARNow shuttle at UNT Dallas Station

Overview
- Locale: Kaufman County, Rockwall County, parts of Dallas County, Texas
- Transit type: Bus, On-Demand, Paratransit
- Number of lines: 3 (bus)
- Annual ridership: 135,000+
- Chief executive: Jerry Dittman
- Headquarters: 500 Industrial Blvd. Terrell, Texas
- Website: startransit.org

Operation
- Began operation: 1988
- Number of vehicles: 55

STAR Transit is a transit agency in Texas serving the cities of Mesquite, Balch Springs, Seagoville, Hutchins, and DeSoto, plus the entirety of Rockwall County and Kaufman County. From its inception in 1988, it was previously known as Kaufman Area Rural Transit (KART) and operated only as a rural transit district before adopting its current name in 2011.

STAR Transit primarily connects non-DART member cities to the light rail system in Dallas with fixed bus routes and on-demand service. The agency also provides general and Medicaid transportation in its entire service area (plus neighboring Ellis and Navarro counties) and operates one of DART's GoLink service areas.

== History ==
The Texas and Pacific Railway runs through the city of Mesquite and through Kaufman County; passenger trains such as the Sunshine Special and Texas Eagle regularly traveled on the route for much of the 20th century (Amtrak continues to run its modern Texas Eagle through the old track). Passenger trains never have and still do not drop off passengers in either Mesquite or Kaufman County, instead doing so in Dallas.

The origins of public transport for residents east of the Dallas–Fort Worth metroplex began in 1980 when the company Kaufman County Senior Citizens Services (presently known as Senior Connect) started providing limited transportation services to the county. The system ceased being senior-exclusive in 1988 when it fell under a new name: Kaufman Area Rural Transit.

KART operated only in Kaufman County for the next 17 years until the agency began servicing neighboring Rockwall County in 2005. The agency also began providing Medicaid transportation for Ellis and Navarro counties in 2009.

However, KART would soon need to expand its focus as cities in Dallas County who had originally rejected to join DART in the 1980s realized the system's benefits; Mesquite agreed to pay over $300,000 a year for DART to establish a new bus route that connected the city's Hanby Stadium to the Green Line through Lawnview station. In 2011, KART renamed itself to STAR Transit. By April 2018, STAR Transit had launched fixed bus routes in seven cities. In 2021, the agency released a ridesharing on-demand app known as STARNow.

== Member cities and counties ==
Below is a table displaying cities and counties that are members of STAR Transit. As of April 2023, no cities have left the agency since joining. Due to the volume of members, only cities that have or have had fixed bus routes are included on this list; otherwise, they are part of the listed counties.

City/County	Year Joined	Notes
Kaufman County	1988	Original STAR (KART) Transit member.
Kaufman	1988	Site of the first fixed route, the Kaufman Trolley, launched by STAR Transit in 2012. Suspended since April 6, 2020. Also serviced by the STARNow app.
Terrell	1988	Previously had two fixed routes, Terrell Routes 803 and 804, since 2017. Suspended since April 6, 2020. Also serviced by the STARNow app.
Rockwall County	2005	General and Medicaid transportation available.
Seagoville	2013	Previously had a fixed route, Seagoville Express, since 2016. Suspended since September 30, 2021. Also serviced by the STARNow app.
Balch Springs	2014	Has had a fixed route, the Balch Springs Midtown Express, since 2015. Also serviced by the STARNow app.
Mesquite	2014	STAR Transit began operating Mesquite's DART Express Bus Route 282 in 2015 and still does so. Also serviced by the STARNow app.
Hutchins	2017	Has had a fixed route, the 401 Hutchins Shuttle, since 2017.
DeSoto	2018	Previously had a fixed route, Route 501, since 2018. Suspended since December 1, 2021. Also serviced by the STARNow app.

== Services ==
=== Bus routes ===
As of April 6, 2023, STAR Transit operates three fixed bus routes in three cities. All services connect to a DART rail station, whether automatically or by verbal request.

==== 101 Balch Springs Midtown Express ====
The MTX 101 Route starts at Walmart and ends at Peachtree Senior Living Apartments, providing access to Floyd Elementary School, Balch Springs Recreation Center, and other destinations with a total of ten stops. Upon request, the bus will also travel to DART Green Line Buckner station. No service on Sundays.

==== 201 Mesquite COMPASS Shuttle ====
The COMPASS Shuttle travels directly from DART Green Line Lawnview station to Hanby Stadium near downtown Mesquite on weekdays only.

==== 401 Hutchins Shuttle ====
The 401 Shuttle operates in a loop, providing service to DART Blue Line UNT Dallas station, Cedar Valley College, and various apartments and stores via 11 stops. Weekdays only.

==== Former bus routes ====
STAR Transit has suspended various fixed routes, mostly due to low ridership or high cost reasonings:

- Route 102 - Second route of the Balch Springs Midtown Express. Formed a loop around Balch Springs and connected with MTX 101 at three points. Replaced by STARNow service in 2020.
- Route 501 - The city of DeSoto's fixed bus route. Connected to UNT Dallas station and Methodist Charlton Medical Center. Closed in 2021 due to the COVID-19 pandemic and replaced with STARNow service.
- Routes 803 and 804 - Served the city of Terrell and canceled due to COVID-19 concerns.
- Kaufman Trolley - Served the city of Kaufman and canceled due to COVID-19 concerns.
- Seagoville Express - Weekday-only service that connected to DART's Buckner station by verbal request. Replaced by STARNow service in 2021 due to cost concerns.

=== On-demand service ===
STAR Transit provides on-demand service in Mesquite, Balch Springs, Kaufman, Terrell, Forney, Seagoville, and DeSoto via the associated STARNow app or phone number. Pick-up and drop-off points must be located inside the zone. Open Monday-Saturday.

=== General and Medicaid transportation ===
STAR Transit allows for origin-to-destination pickup service for its member cities in Dallas County plus anywhere in the counties of Kaufman and Rockwall. Rides must be scheduled by phone at least one day in advance.

STAR Transit also provides for Medicaid clients in the aforementioned areas and, despite not being members, Navarro County and Ellis County.

=== GoLink and GoPass ===
One of DART's on-demand GoLink zones, the Inland Port Connect Service, is operated by STAR Transit. Tickets and fares for STAR Transit can be paid for through DART's GoPass app.
