= Mikail Baker =

American gridiron football player (born 1987)

No. 39
- Position: Cornerback

Personal information
- Born: June 19, 1987 (age 39); Dallas, Texas, U.S.
- Listed height: 6 ft 0 in (1.83 m)
- Listed weight: 200 lb (91 kg)

Career information
- High school: Skyline (Dallas)
- College: Baylor
- NFL draft: 2011: 7th round, 216th overall pick

Career history
- St. Louis Rams (2011)*; Kansas City Chiefs (2012); Toronto Argonauts (2014)*
- * Offseason or practice squad member only
- Stats at Pro Football Reference

Mikail A'Lim Baker (born June 19, 1987) is an American former football cornerback. He was selected by the St. Louis Rams in the seventh round of the 2011 NFL draft. He played college football at Baylor.

He was also a member of the Kansas City Chiefs and Toronto Argonauts.

== Early life ==
Baker attended Skyline High School in Dallas, Texas, where he was a two-time All-District 9-5A wide receiver and helped Skyline to the 2004 Class 5A Division I Region II bi-district playoffs. As a senior, he caught 50 passes for 750 yards and eight touchdowns for the 7-4 Raiders and also rushed 12 times for 150 yards and two scores. He returned a kickoff for a touchdown and accumulated 1,000 all-purpose yards in his final high-school campaign. He caught 24 passes for 357 yards and two touchdowns as junior.

== College career ==
2010 was Baker's sixth season of eligibility and in his second season as a defensive back. He played thirteen games and made 49 tackles (39 solo) and broke up three passes and intercepted one. he also returned 18 kickoffs for a 19.6 yard average.

In 2009 Baker was a medical hardship and played in three only games in 2009, predominantly as primary kick returner, before suffering season-ending knee injury. He totaled 227 yards on nine kick returns (25.2 average) in nine quarters played on the season. He also recorded two tackles and an interception in two-plus games as defensive back. In 2008 as a junior he played in 11 of 12 games during and made one start. He made four receptions on the season, for 44 yards and was Baylor's leading kick returner, averaged 25.3 yards on 30 returns with one touchdown. His 25.27 kick return average ranked sixth in Big 12 and tied for 37th nationally.

In 2007, he was a medical redshirt due to a broken collar bone vs. Rice For the season he caught six passes for 87 yards (14.5 ypc) and had four kickoff returns for 103 yards (25.8 ypr). In 2006, his sophomore season, he appeared in every game as sophomore wide receiver, but made mark on Bears' kickoff return unit. On 22 kickoff returns, averaged 23.73 yards to rank No. 4 in Big 12 and No. 37 nationally. As a true freshman in 2005 he finished seventh on squad in receptions with eight for 158 yards and one touchdown in nine games.

== Professional career ==
Pre-draft measurables
Height	Weight	40-yard dash	10-yard split	20-yard split	20-yard shuttle	Three-cone drill	Vertical jump	Broad jump	Bench press
5 ft 11 3/8 in (1.81 m)	191 lb (87 kg)	4.41 s	1.49 s	2.56 s	4.00 s	7.13 s	38.0 in (0.97 m)	10 ft 10 in (3.30 m)	12 reps
All values from Baylor Pro Day

=== St. Louis Rams ===
Baker was selected with the 216th pick in the 2011 NFL draft by the St. Louis Rams. He was waived/injured on August 30, 2011, and subsequently reverted to the team's injured reserve list on September 2, 2011. He was released from injured reserve with an injury settlement on October 16, 2011.

=== Kansas City Chiefs ===
Baker was signed by the Kansas City Chiefs on April 17, 2012.

=== Toronto Argonauts ===
He was signed by the Toronto Argonauts on March 27, 2014. He was released by the Argonauts on May 7, 2014.
