= Inwood/Love Field station =

DART rail station in Dallas, Texas

Inwood/Love Field
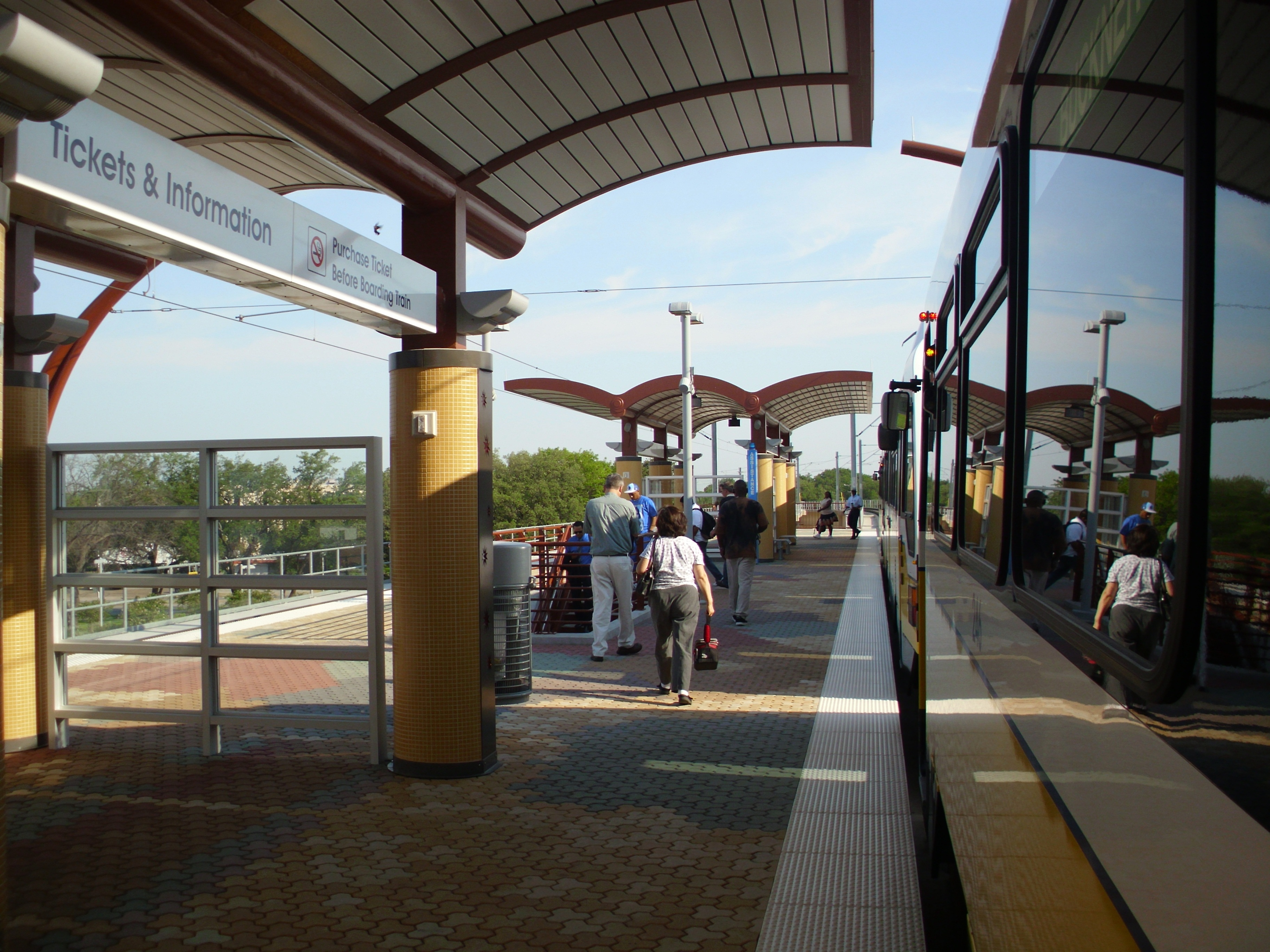
- Inwood/Love Field station platform

General information
- Location: 2720 Inwood Road; Dallas, Texas
- Coordinates: 32°49′19″N 96°50′00″W
- System: DART rail
- Owner: Dallas Area Rapid Transit
- Platforms: 1 island platform
- Tracks: 2
- Bus stands: 5
- Connections: DART: 5 (Love Link), 103, 207, 222, Park Cities GoLink Zone (daily)

Construction
- Structure type: Elevated
- Parking: 385 spaces
- Cycle facilities: 2 bike lockers, 1 bike rack
- Accessible: Yes

History
- Opened: December 6, 2010

Passengers
- FY 2025: 1,006 (avg. weekday) ▼3.6%

Services
Preceding station	DART	Following station
Burbank toward North Carrollton/Frankford	Green Line	Southwestern Medical District/Parkland toward Buckner
Burbank toward DFW Airport Terminal A	Orange Line	Southwestern Medical District/Parkland toward LBJ/Central or Parker Road
Location

Inwood/Love Field station is a DART rail station in Dallas, Texas. The elevated station is located at the intersection of Inwood Road and Denton Drive in the western end of the Oak Lawn neighborhood. The station is served by the Green Line and the Orange Line.

The station is the rail system's main connection to Dallas Love Field, though it is not located at the airport proper. DART operates a bus route, dubbed Love Link, which connects the station to the airport's passenger terminal. Dallas's other major airport, Dallas Fort Worth International Airport, is also located on the Orange Line; a trip between Inwood/Love Field and the DFW Airport station takes approximately 39 minutes.

== History ==
Inwood/Love Field station was opened on December 6, 2010 as part of the Green Line's second phase. The station led to the creation of several apartment complexes in the surrounding area.

In 2015, carsharing company Zipcar added two dedicated spaces for their vehicles to the station's parking lot. This was the second DART station to offer Zipcar vehicles, with Mockingbird station being the first.

=== Love Field connection ===
Early proposals for the Green Line called for the creation of a subway station underneath Love Field, which would have connected to the airport terminal directly. This proposal was dropped in 2004 after a study determined that the station would be too costly. DART later proposed a submerged people mover, which would connect the airport to Burbank station, but this ran into similar cost issues.

Ultimately, DART opted to defer the people mover and modify bus route 39 (which connected Downtown Dallas and Love Field) to also service Inwood station. Funds earmarked for the people mover were later transferred to the Dallas Streetcar, effectively killing the proposal.

In late 2012, DART split off the Love Field connection into its own route, which was numbered route 524 and named Love Link. The route was renumbered to route 55 in January 2022 as part of a major overhaul to DART's bus system, though the route itself remained the same. It was renumbered again to route 5 in January 2023 to indicate a frequency increase.
