= Sara Mokuria =

American activist

- Born: Lower Greenville, Dallas, Texas
- Education: The New School; Simmons College
- Occupations: Activist, teacher
- Known for: Police accountability

Sara Mokuria is an American educator and police brutality activist. She is a co-founder of Mothers Against Police Brutality, a Texas-based group that advocates for civil rights, police accountability, and policy reform.

== Early life and education ==
Mokuria was born in Lower Greenville, Dallas and grew up in Pleasant Grove. When she was 10, she witnessed her father shot and killed by two Dallas police officers in her kitchen. Her mother had called 911 during an argument and the police say he "lunged towards them" with the knife when they arrived; Mokuria's mother says the police killing was not justified.

Mokuria graduated the Booker T. Washington High School for the Performing and Visual Arts. She later earned her bachelor's degree from The New School in New York City and two master's degrees from Simmons College in Boston. While in college, she joined the Malcolm X Grassroots Movement, providing early exposure to protesting against police brutality.

== Career ==
Mokuria returned to Dallas after graduating from Simmons College as a teacher at Skyline High School; in 2008, the district ran into a budget crisis forcing over 400 teachers to be laid off, including Mokuria. She also worked as an associate director for The Institute for Urban Policy Research at the University of Texas at Dallas.

In 2013, Mokuria co-founded Mothers Against Police Brutality alongside Collette Flanagan and John Fullinwider. The same year, Flanagan's son was killed by a Dallas police officer while unarmed, and she joined with both Mokuria and Fullunwider to form a "multi-racial, multi-ethnic coalition uniting mothers nationwide to fight for civil rights, police accountability, and policy reform".

Mokuria cites her father's killing as motivating her activism, stating that the criminal justice system doesn't "work for either side". She has stated that the police force can't be the "catch-all" for every societal ill, and advocates for more community funding and increased leadership. She considers initiatives like President Obama's 21st Century Policing task force progress but not enough. She also cites the George Floyd protests that happened during the COVID-19 pandemic as evidence that people are willing to risk their lives for a greater cause.
