= Ascher Silberstein =

Ascher Silberstein (18 September 1852 – 17 December 1909) was born in the Austrian Empire on September 18, 1852. He came to the United States at the age of 15 and settled in Jefferson, Texas, later moving to Dallas and was engaged in the cattle business. He was associated, at different times, with Ellis Cockrell and J.B. Wilson. Early in 1909, he was one of the organizers of the Trinity National Bank, which merged with the City National Bank at the time of Silberstein's death. He founded and was, for a number of years, president of the Dallas Oil and Refining Company. Silberstein was a quiet and unassuming man and a liberal contributor toward any worthy cause that was brought to his notice. When a meeting was held to raise funds for the flood victims in May 1907, he was one of the first to rise and say, "I will give a thousand dollars." Silberstein died suddenly on December 17, 1909. In his will, he bequeathed a very large amount of his estate to various charitable and educational institutions, including the Buckner Orphans Home, the Dallas City Hospital, and the Dallas Public Schools.
