= Skyline High School (Texas) =

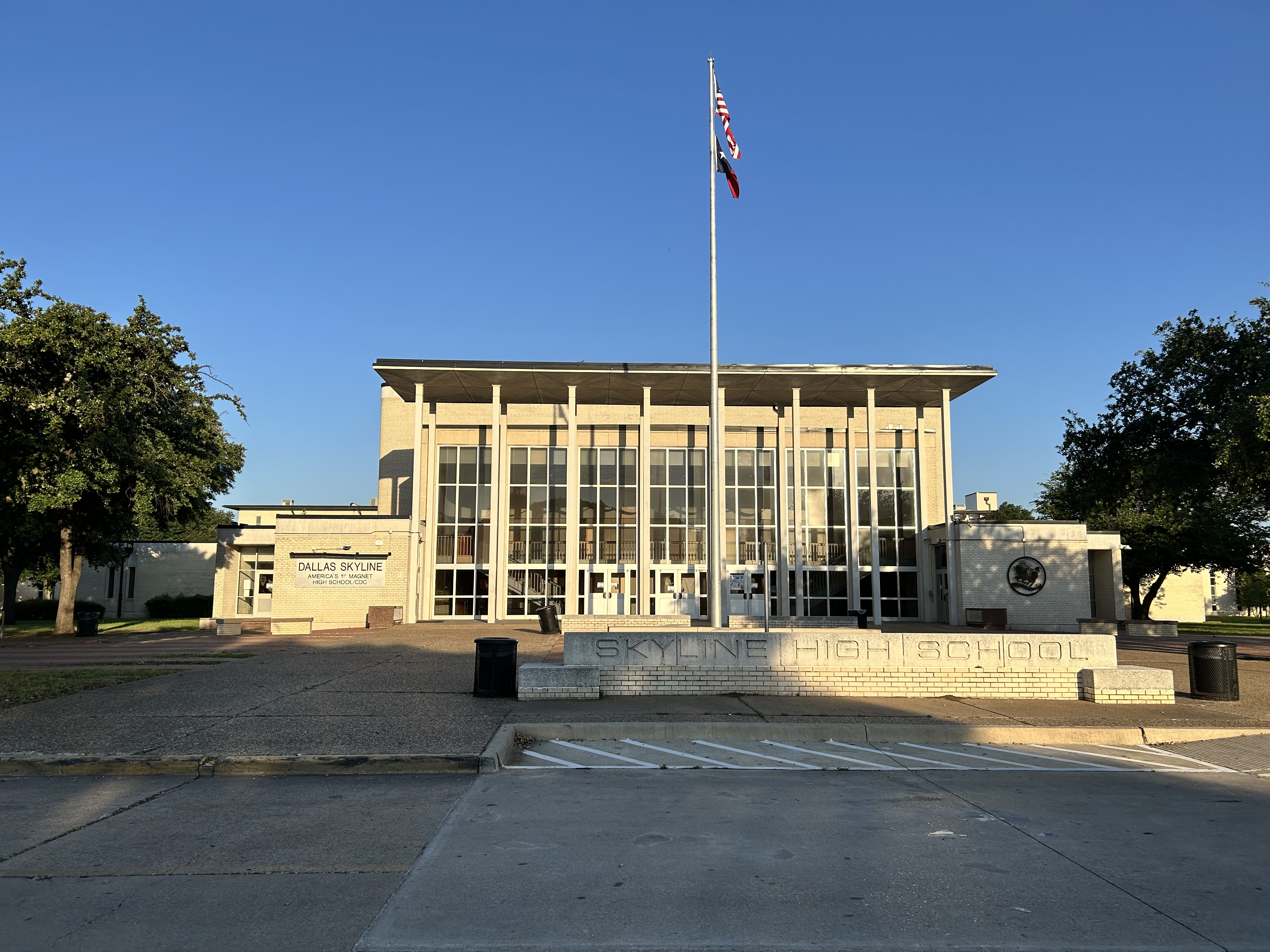
- Main building of the school's campus

Location
- 7777 Forney Road; Dallas, Texas 75227-2505; United States; 32°46′47″N 96°41′16″W

Information
- School type: Public high school
- Motto: "Unity in Effort...Pride in Result" "We are ONE!"
- Opened: 1970
- School district: Dallas ISD
- Principal: Joseph Pouncy
- Staff: 328
- Faculty: 285
- Teaching staff: 248.79 (FTE)
- Grades: 9–12
- Student to teacher ratio: 15.19
- Colors: Columbia blue and scarlet
- Nickname: Raiders
- Graduates (2024): 705
- Website: skyline.dallasisd.org

Skyline High School is a public magnet school near Buckner Terrace area of Dallas, Texas. Skyline is a part of the Dallas Independent School District (DISD) and serves grades 9 through 12.

In 2015, the school was rated "Met Standard" by the Texas Education Agency.

Skyline was the first magnet high school in the United States.

== History ==
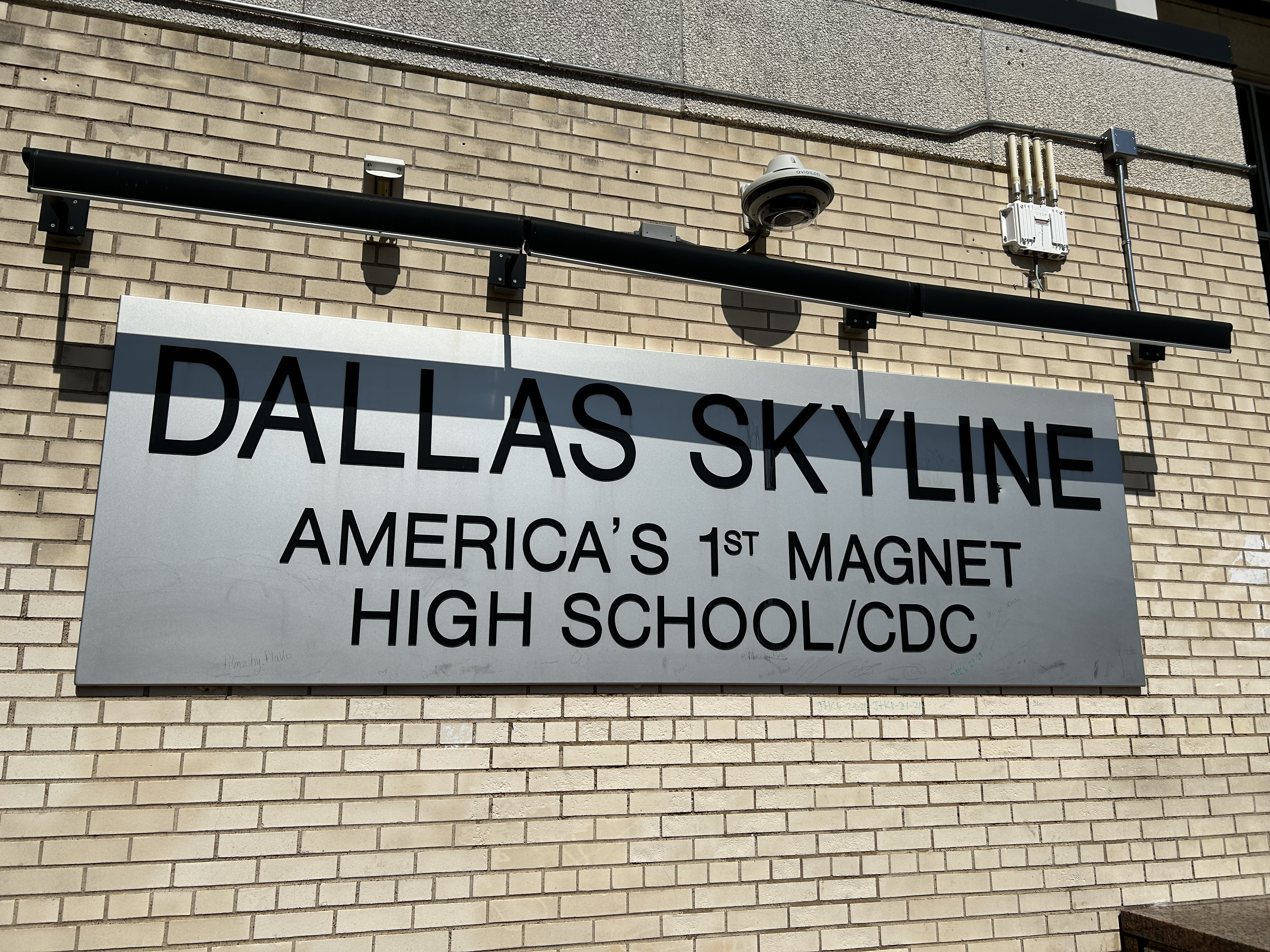
Sign at the entrance of Skyline reading "America's 1st Magnet High School/CDC"

In the mid-1960s, B. J. Stamps, Bragg Stockton, and other Dallas educators conceived the idea of a very large high school for the Dallas Independent School District that would offer career education in addition to a traditional high-school curriculum. Stamps emphasized continually that the facility he envisioned was "absolutely not going to be a vocational school for unsuccessful students" but rather a place where superior students could undertake studies in preparation for a variety of professions. In December 1966, architectural plans for the school, whose working name was "Science-Technical Center," were approved by the Dallas School Board. By 1969, Stamps, who had been slated as the school's first principal, suggested the name "Skyline High School," inspired by the view of the Downtown Dallas skyline afforded from the school's upper floors, and in February 1970 the Skyline name was approved by the school board.

Classes at Skyline began in the fall semester of 1970. Until the main facility at 7777 Forney Road opened early in 1971, instruction was held at other southeast Dallas sites. From its inception, Skyline has fulfilled Stamps's original conception of offering both a regular high-school curriculum and a multitude of magnet school programs. The magnet offerings are organized as clusters, which are collectively called the Career Development Center. A student attending Skyline may generally choose between two options: pursuing a normal, traditional curriculum (Skyline's original attendance zone was drawn to relieve overcrowding at Samuell and Bryan Adams high schools); or attending both a cluster and regular classes at Skyline.

In the early years of Skyline's existence, administrators and faculty of existing, traditional high schools in the Dallas Independent School District frequently expressed resentment of Skyline's desire to recruit their talented and gifted students and in some instances actively resisted recruitment efforts. District officials appointed a task force to address these concerns. Nevertheless, with the continued existence of Skyline's magnet programs and the subsequent "spinning off" of several independent magnet schools, the issue has persisted to the present day, and district officials continue efforts to allay feelings of resentment.

Over time, numerous clusters have left Skyline and moved into facilities of their own, becoming full-fledged DISD magnet high schools. For example, the Performing Arts Cluster and the Health Careers Cluster both discontinued their affiliations with Skyline in 1976 and became, respectively, the (presently-named) Booker T. Washington High School for the Performing and Visual Arts and the High School for the Health Professions (now the School of Health Professions at Yvonne A. Ewell Townview Magnet Center). In 2007, district officials announced a plan to relieve overcrowding at Skyline by moving several Skyline magnet programs to Emmett J. Conrad High School, meanwhile hoping to increase the latter's achievement levels. These actions have in some instances occasioned resentment by Skyline's own faculty and educational community, who have worried that Skyline's Career Development Center was created only to ultimately self-destruct, and, in the most recent events, that successful students educated at Skyline are being used to artificially boost another school's academic standing. District officials continue in their efforts to respond to these controversies.

Skyline served grades 10 and 11 in 1970–1971, and grades 10–12 from 1971 to 1976. The school has included grades 9–12 since the fall of 1976. Since its opening Skyline has consistently been DISD's largest high school in terms of enrollment. As of 2015, Skyline is one of the largest predominately Hispanic high schools in Texas with over 70% of the 4,500+ students identifying as Hispanic.

In 1971, Nolan Estes, the DISD superintendent, referred to it as a "magnet school" upon its introduction; Jim Schutze of the Dallas Observer wrote, "According to Skyline lore, it is the oldest and biggest magnet school in the nation."

In 2021, a policy was enacted barring tardy students from attending classes. Outrage from parents resulted in media coverage and eventual overturning of the policy.

In 2023, Skyline was featured on NBC's "Brag About Your School".

In 2024, Skyline faculty announced the Super Senior Scholarship, (Note: The name for the scholarship was chosen for alliteration and has no relation to super seniors.) a $500 scholarship for seniors paid for by donations from Skyline alumni.

== Athletics ==
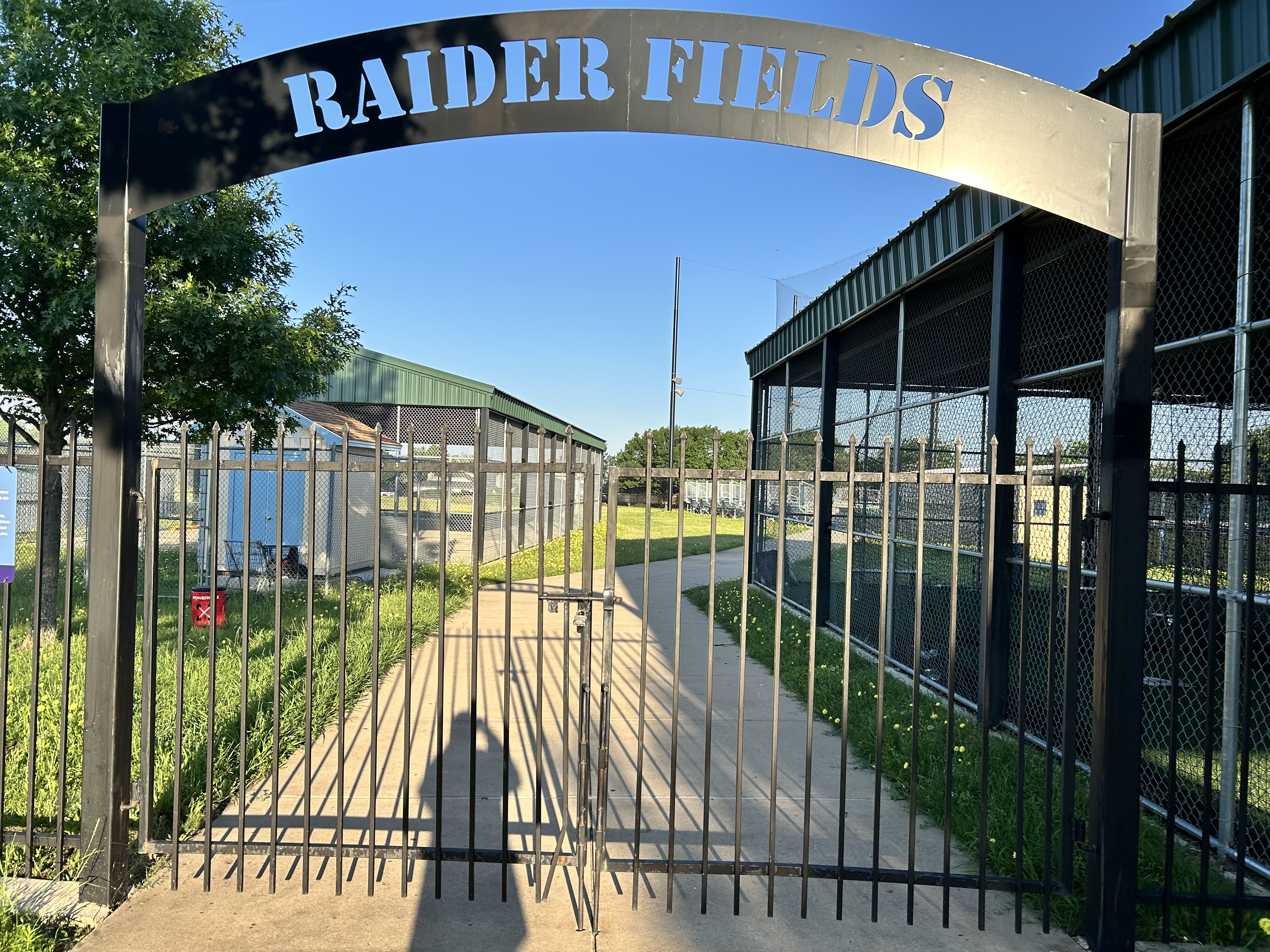
Entrance to Raider Fields

The Skyline Raiders compete in the following sports:

- Baseball
- Basketball
- Cross country
- Football
- Golf
- Soccer
- Softball
- Swimming and diving
- Tennis
- Track and field
- Volleyball
- Wrestling

== Academics ==
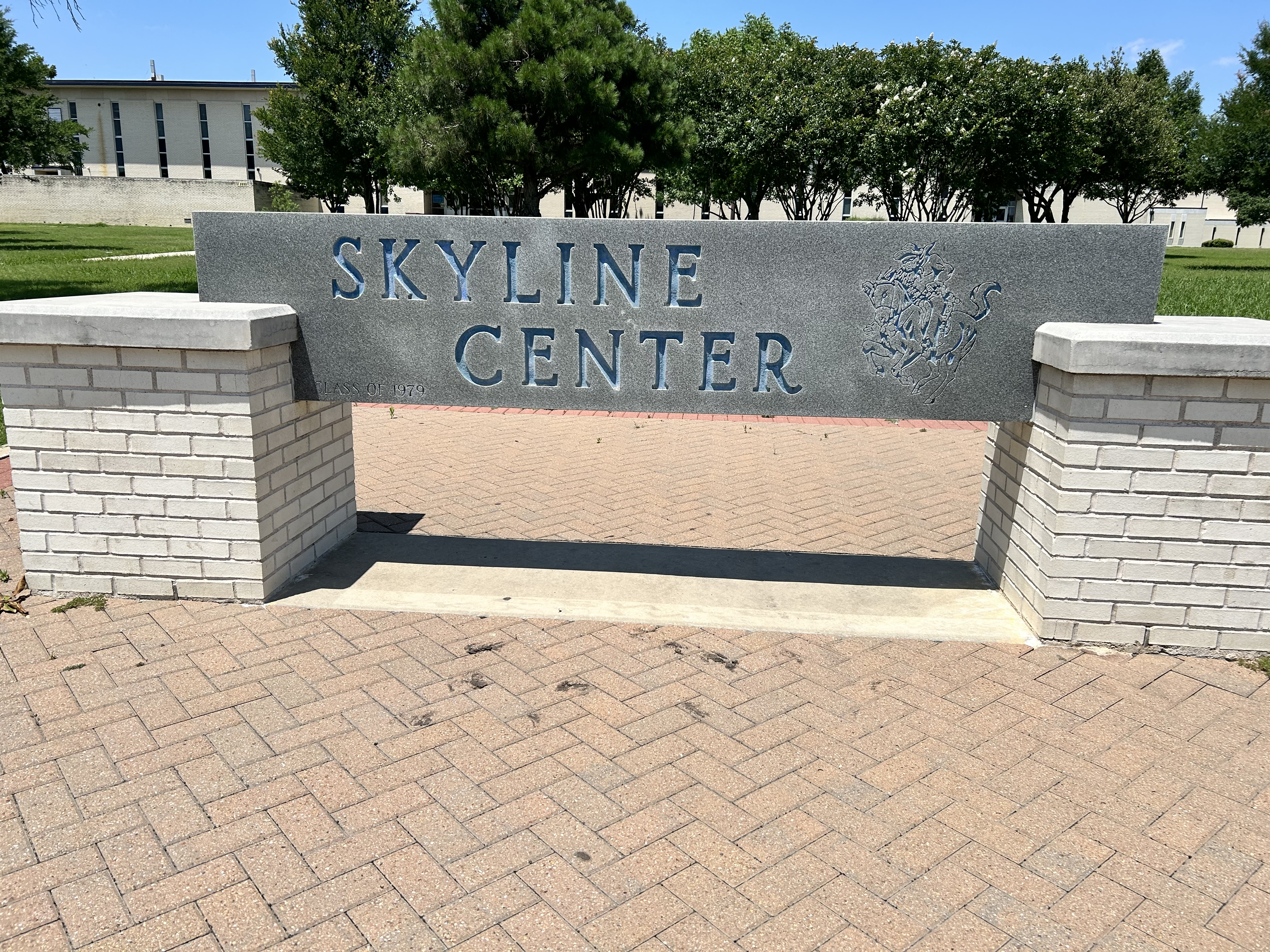
Sign commemorating Skyline's CDC, outside of B-building

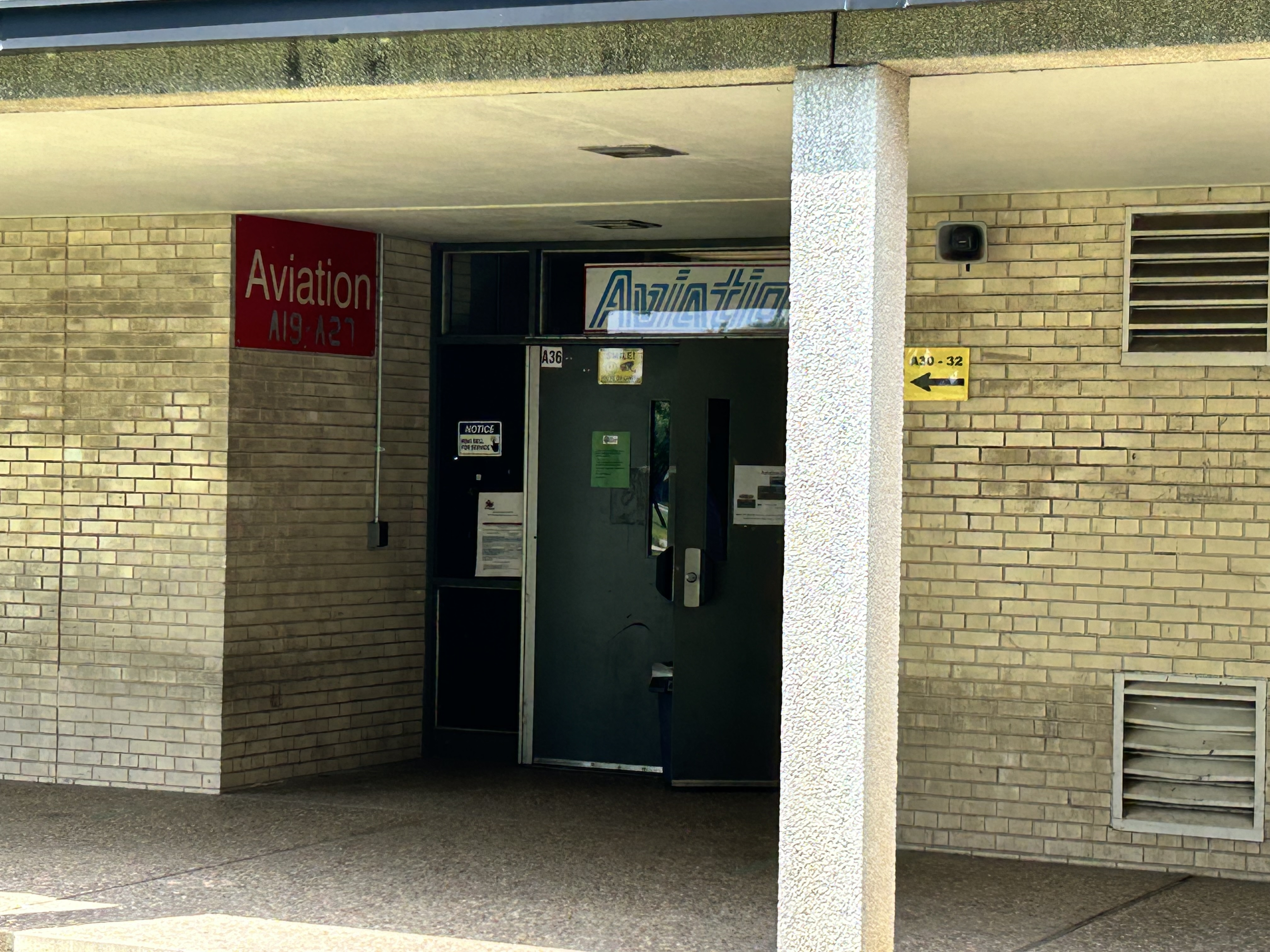
The entrance of the Aviation section of A-building

Skyline High School has the following programs:

- Early College HS
- Magnet - Career Development Center:
  - Advanced Mathematics
  - Advanced Science
  - Advanced Social Sciences
  - Aviation
  - Architecture
  - Automotive Technology
  - Construction Technology
  - Cosmetology
  - Culinary Arts
  - Fashion Marketing & Apparel Design
  - Graphic Design & Illustration
  - Interior Design
  - Photography
  - Radio Television & Film
  - World Languages
- Career Pathways:
  - NAF Academies:
    - Academy of Engineering
    - Academy of Finance
    - Academy of Health Science
    - Academy of Hospitality & Tourism
    - Academy of Information Technology
  - JROTC
  - Video Game Design
  - Floral & Horticulture

About 90% of the students graduate yearly, while averaging 1000 students per graduating class.

A team of Skyline students won the United States National Academic Championship in 1985.

In 2024, Skyline's Advanced Mathematics cluster, and specifically the AP Statistics class, were highlighted on NBC's "Brag About Your School".

== Feeder patterns ==
Elementary schools that feed into Skyline include Frank Guzick, Edna Rowe, Adelfa Callejo, George W. Truett, and Urban Park.

Harold W. Lang, Sr. Middle School and Ann Richards Middle School (partial ) feed into Skyline.

== Notable people ==
=== Alumni ===
- Mikail Baker '05, NFL football player
- Josh Bell '03, NFL and CFL football player
- Brent Bourgeois '74, Christian rock musician and producer
- Aaron Brewer '16, NFL football player
- Hector Cantú '80, writer, editor, newspaper comic strip creator
- Cowboy Troy '89, country music artist
- Terry Crouch '77, NFL football player
- Mike Davis '10, NFL football player
- Paul Dawson '11, NFL football player
- Deryl Dodd '82, country music artist
- Richard Dominguez '79, comic book artist, "El Gato Negro"
- Aaron Ford '90, Nevada state senator, attorney general, governor-elect
- Kyle Gann '73, classical composer, musicologist, music critic, author, and educator
- Marcus Garrett '17, basketball player, signed two-way contract with NBA Miami Heat
- Peri Gilpin '79, actress (best known as "Roz Doyle" on Frasier)
- Omar Gonzalez '06, MLS soccer player
- Chris Holt '90, major league baseball player
- Steve Holy '90, country music singer
- Tim Jackson '84, NFL football player
- Larry Johnson '87, NBA basketball star
- Michael Johnson '86, world and Olympic champion sprinter
- Dante Jones '83, NFL football player
- Zach LeDay '12, but transferred to The Colony High School for senior year, Israeli Basketball Premier League player
- Lanham Lyne '72, Texas state representative, former mayor of Wichita Falls, Texas
- Calvin "C. J." Miles, Jr. '05, NBA basketball player
- Keith Miller '80, major league baseball player
- Mike Morgan '06, NFL football player, Super Bowl champion
- Corey Nelson '10, NFL football player for the Atlanta Falcons, Super Bowl 50 champion
- Isaiah Nwokobia '21, NFL safety for the Cincinnati Bengals
- Joe Riley '82, visual and plastic artist, SubGenius
- Allen Rossum '94, NFL football player
- Ra'Shaad Samples '13, NFL assistant coach
- Jason Siggers '03, Israel Basketball Premier League basketball player
- J. David Spurlock '78, author, artist, art professor, artist's rights advocate
- Troy Stoudermire '08, CFL football player
- Michael Weiss '76, jazz pianist, composer, bandleader, recording artist
- Steve Williams '09, NFL football player
- Antonio Wilson '95, NFL football player
- John Yuan '92, actor, best known for Observe and Report
- Matthew Yuan '92, actor, best known for Observe and Report

=== Faculty ===
- Sara Mokuria

== Gallery ==
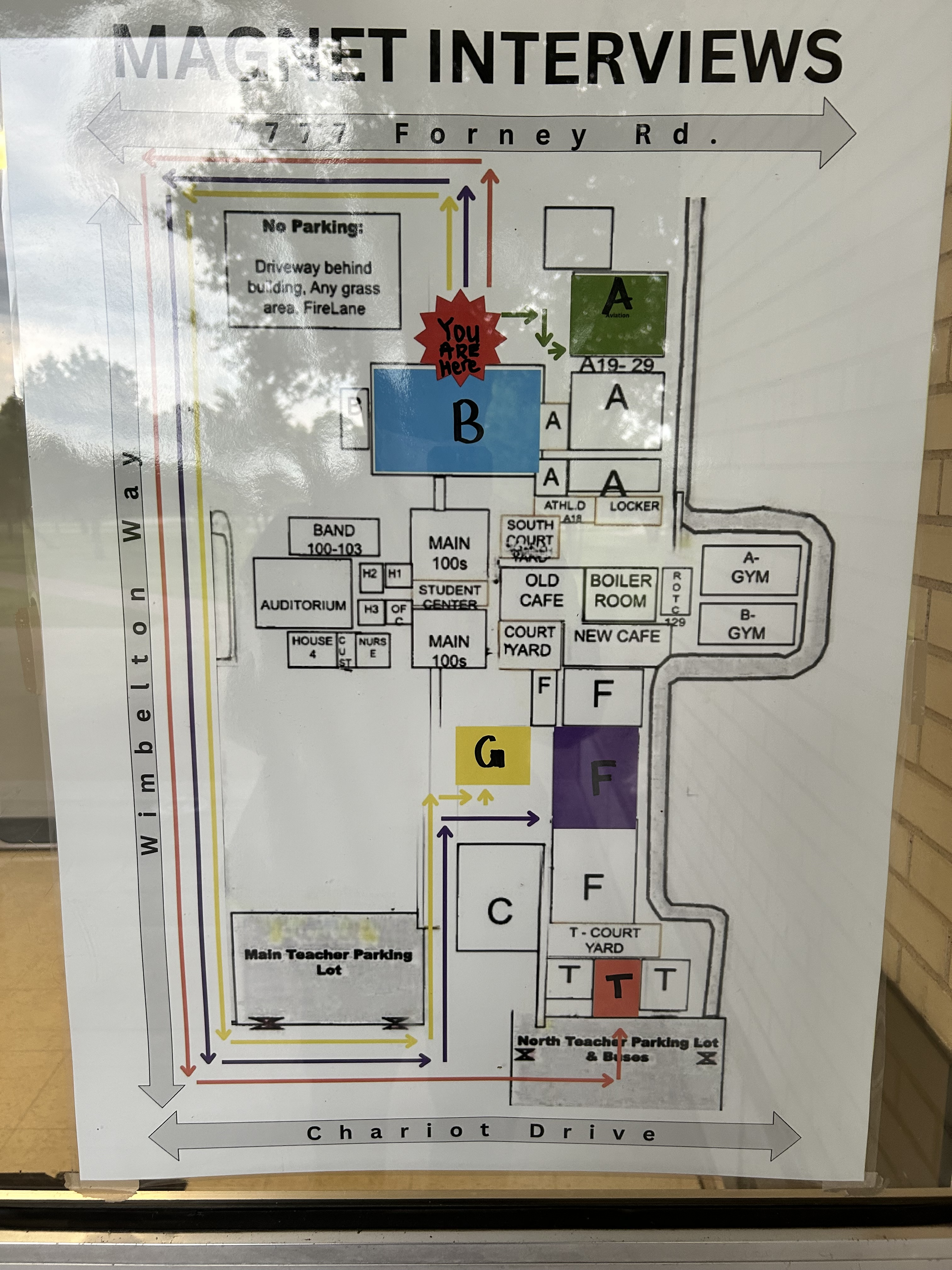
Map of the campus

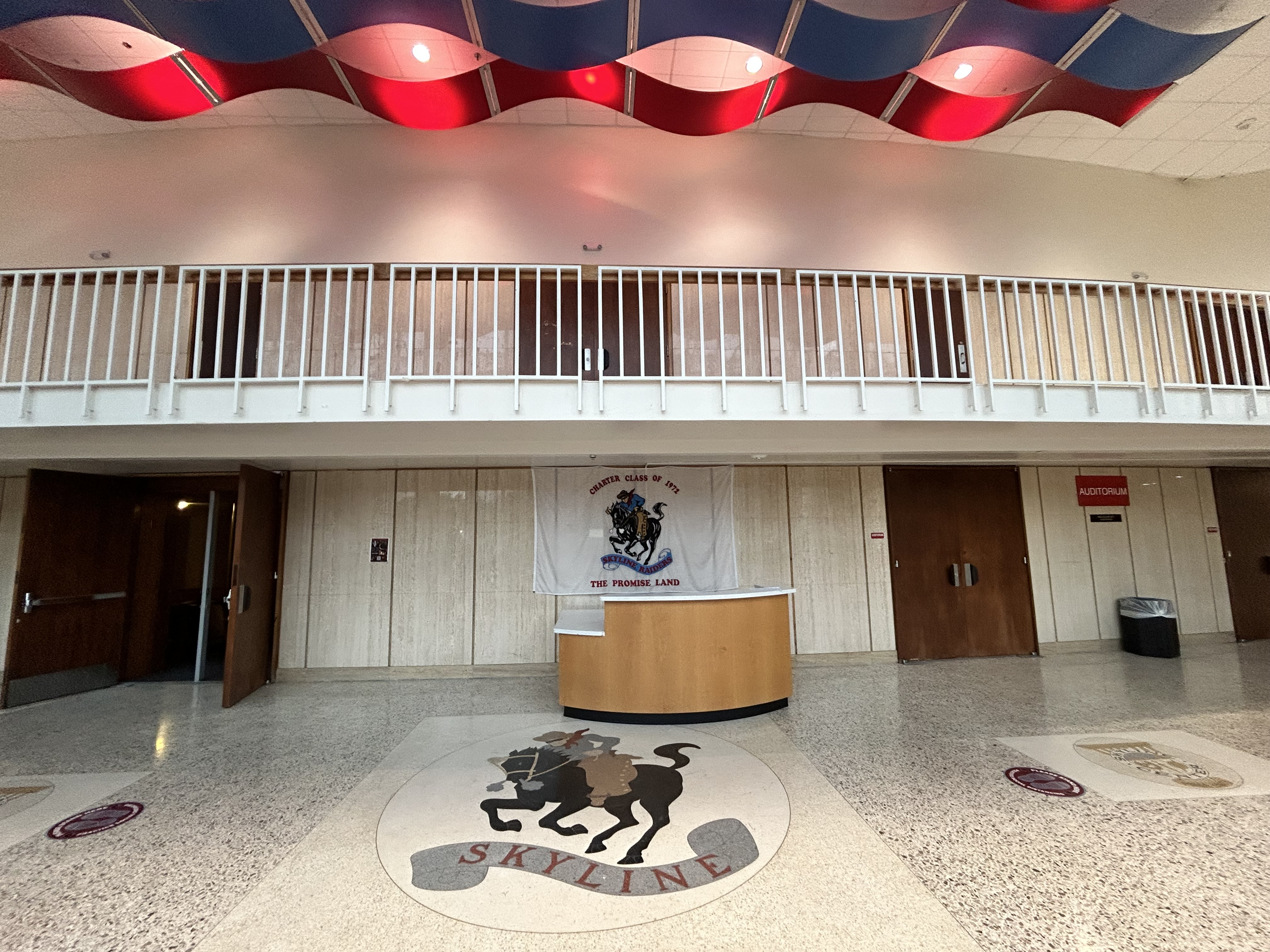
Entrance to the main building

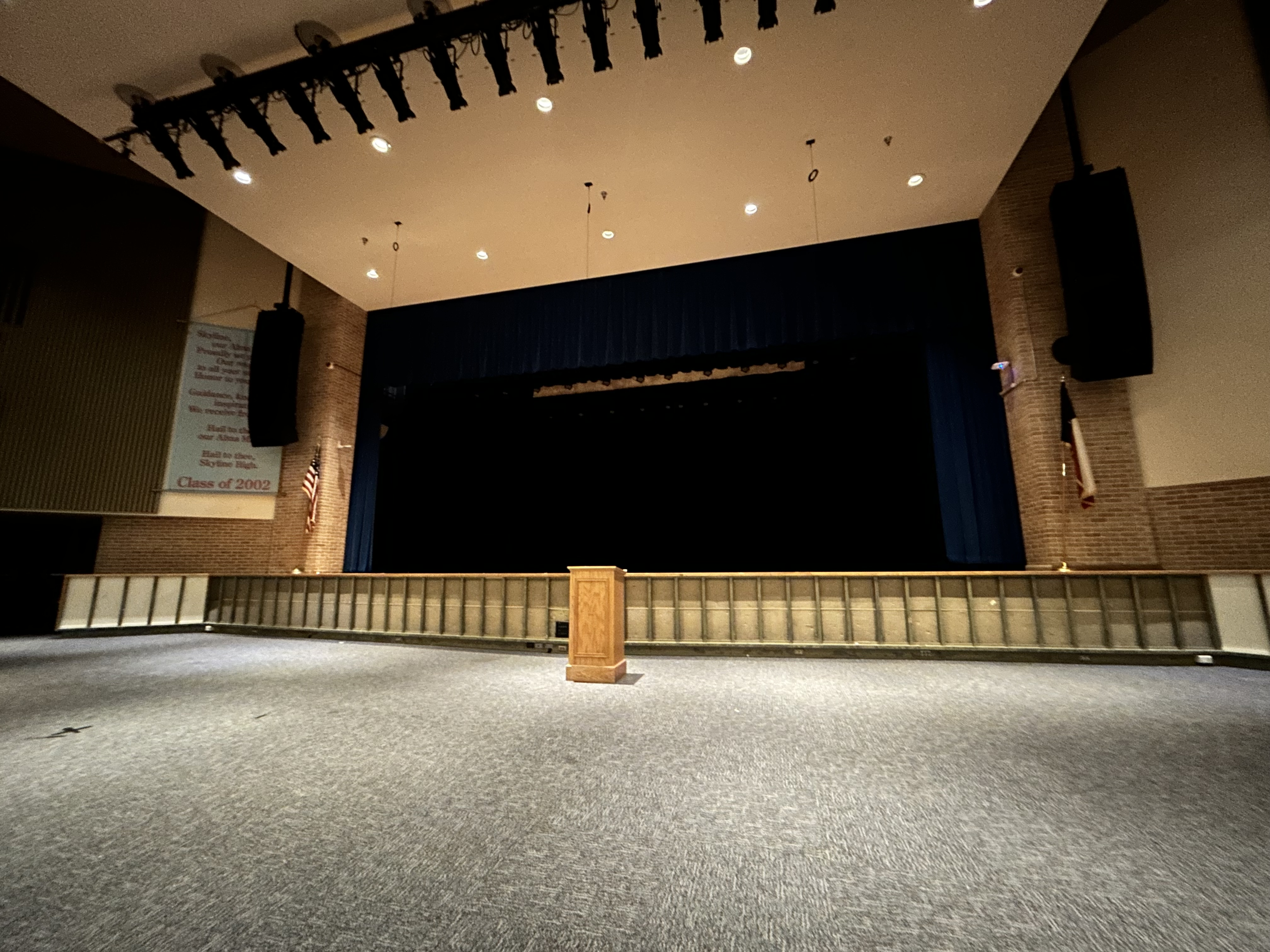
Interior of the auditorium

== Notes ==
Preceded by Wheelersburg High School	National Academic Championship champion 1985	Succeeded by Irmo High School
