= Pleasant Grove, Dallas =

Area in southeast Dallas, Texas

Pleasant Grove is an area located in the southeastern section of Dallas, Texas, United States.

The Pleasant Grove area is bounded by Bruton Road to the North, Marvel Dr. on the south, Prairie Creek (the creek, not the road) on the east and the Trinity Forest on the west.

== History ==
The first settlers in the Pleasant Grove area in the 1840s included W. B. Elam, who held one of the original land grant, Richard Bruton, and Cornelius Cox. By 1875 a wooden building was used as a union church and school. An early teacher at one of the schools built in the 1880s was Don Lebow, who named the school Pleasant Grove after its location in a grove of cottonwood trees. The name was then applied to both the school and the community.

In 1900 Sam Street's map of Dallas County showed Pleasant Grove as a small community with a store. In 1916 the first brick schoolhouse was built.

In 1937 Pleasant Grove formed its own school district, which by the late 1940s had fourteen buildings.

Due to a post-World War II housing boom, the population grew from 120 to 3,500 between 1943 and 1952. By the late 1940s, Pleasant Grove had seven businesses, including a new bank. Businesses remained less important than the residential areas, but in 1952, Pleasant Grove Shopping Center, a major retail center, was built.

Pleasant Grove twice fought incorporation movements and remained unincorporated till June 1954 when Pleasant Grove was annexed by Dallas and the Pleasant Grove school district merged with the Dallas Independent School District.

In 1962 the Greater Pleasant Grove Chamber of Commerce was formed to promote business in the area. This organization was later expanded to cover surrounding communities, and became the Southeast Dallas Chamber of Commerce.

== Education ==
=== Primary and secondary schools ===
It is within the Dallas Independent School District (DISD).

DISD Middle schools that serve Pleasant Grove students:

- S. S. Conner Junior High (1953 - 1963)
- John B. Hood Junior High School (1955 - 2016)
- Fred F. Florence Middle School (1963 - 2018)
- Ann Richards Middle School in Pleasant Grove (2012 - Present)
- Piedmont G.L.O.B.A.L. Academy (formerly John B. Hood Junior High) (Oct. 2016 - Present)
- Young Men's Academy at Fred Florence (2018 - Present)
- School For The Talented And Gifted In Pleasant Grove (2018 - Present)

DISD High schools that serve or served Pleasant Grove students:

- Pleasant Grove High School (1937-1956)
- W. W. Samuell High School (1956 - Present)
- H. Grady Spruce High School (1963 - Present)
- Skyline High School (1971 - Present)

The charter school operator Life's Beautiful Educational Centers Inc. (closed 1999) operated the school P.O.W.E.R. in Pleasant Grove.

Charter schools that serve Pleasant Grove students:

- A+ Academy Secondary School
- Inspired Vision Elementary School
- Inspired Vision Secondary School
- Golden Rule Pleasant Grove
- KIPP Pleasant Grove
- Nova Charter School
- Texas Can Academy
- Inspired Vision Intermediate
- Henry W. Longfellow Career Exploration Junior High School Academy
- Cristo Rey Dallas College Prep work-study school (2015 - Present)

DISD operates the Pleasant Grove Stadium.

=== Colleges and universities ===
Pleasant Grove has a satellite Branch of Eastfield College of the Dallas County Community College District, in Pleasant Grove/Southeast Dallas at 802 N Buckner Boulevard.

=== Libraries ===
The Pleasant Grove area is served by two public libraries.

1.Pleasant Grove Library Branch - Dallas Public Library Address: 7310 Lake June Rd. ~ in Pleasant Grove/Southeast Dallas

2.Prairie Creek Library Branch - Dallas Public Library Address: 9609 Lake June Rd., in Lake June/Southeast Dallas

== Notable people ==
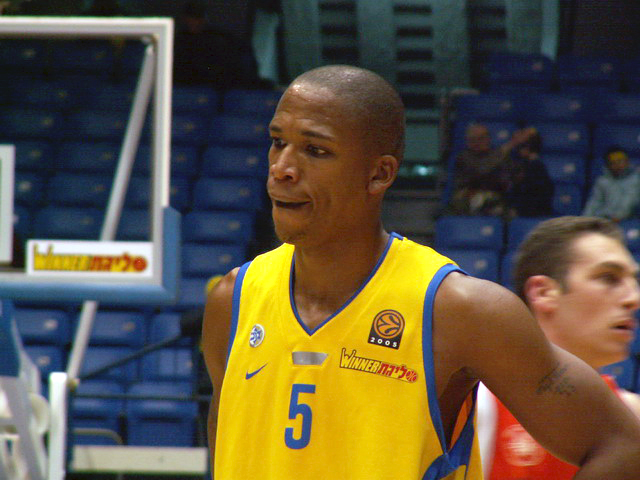
Maceo Demond Baston

- Maceo Baston grew up in the Pleasant Grove area and attended Nancy Moseley Elementary School. He played for the Toronto Raptors in the NBA.
- John Ford Coley — partner in musical duo with classmate Dan Seals; hits include "I'd Really Love to See You Tonight"
- Stanley Hauerwas, the noted theologian and ethicist, was raised in Pleasant Grove, in a working-class family. He attended both Pleasant Grove High School and W. W. Samuell High School .
- Larry Johnson; former NBA player grew up in the Pleasant Grove area and attended John B. Hood Middle School and Skyline High School.
- Michael Johnson also attended Skyline High School, gaining fame as a US Olympic Gold Medalist, setting numerous world records in Men's Sprinting.
- Joe Kendall — Adam federal judge (1992–2002)
- Russ Martin — Host of The Russ Martin Show, a radio program in Dallas.
- C.J. Miles grew up in Pleasant Grove and attended Skyline Career Development Center. As a senior in high school he was named to the McDonald's all-high school team.
- Carl Mitcham — philosopher of technology and engineering, now at Colorado School of Mines
- Sara Mokuria — activist and teacher
- Steve Ramsey — Punter/Quarterback New Orleans Saints 1970, Denver Broncos (1971–76)
- Lulu Roman — Former Hee Haw TV show personality.
- Dan Seals — country and pop musician
- Miguel Angel Treviño Morales — Mexican drug lord of the Los Zetas drug cartel spent parts of his teenage years and early 20’s living in Pleasant Grove in the 90’s.
