= Green Line (DART) =

Light rail line in the Dallas-Fort Worth Metroplex, Texas

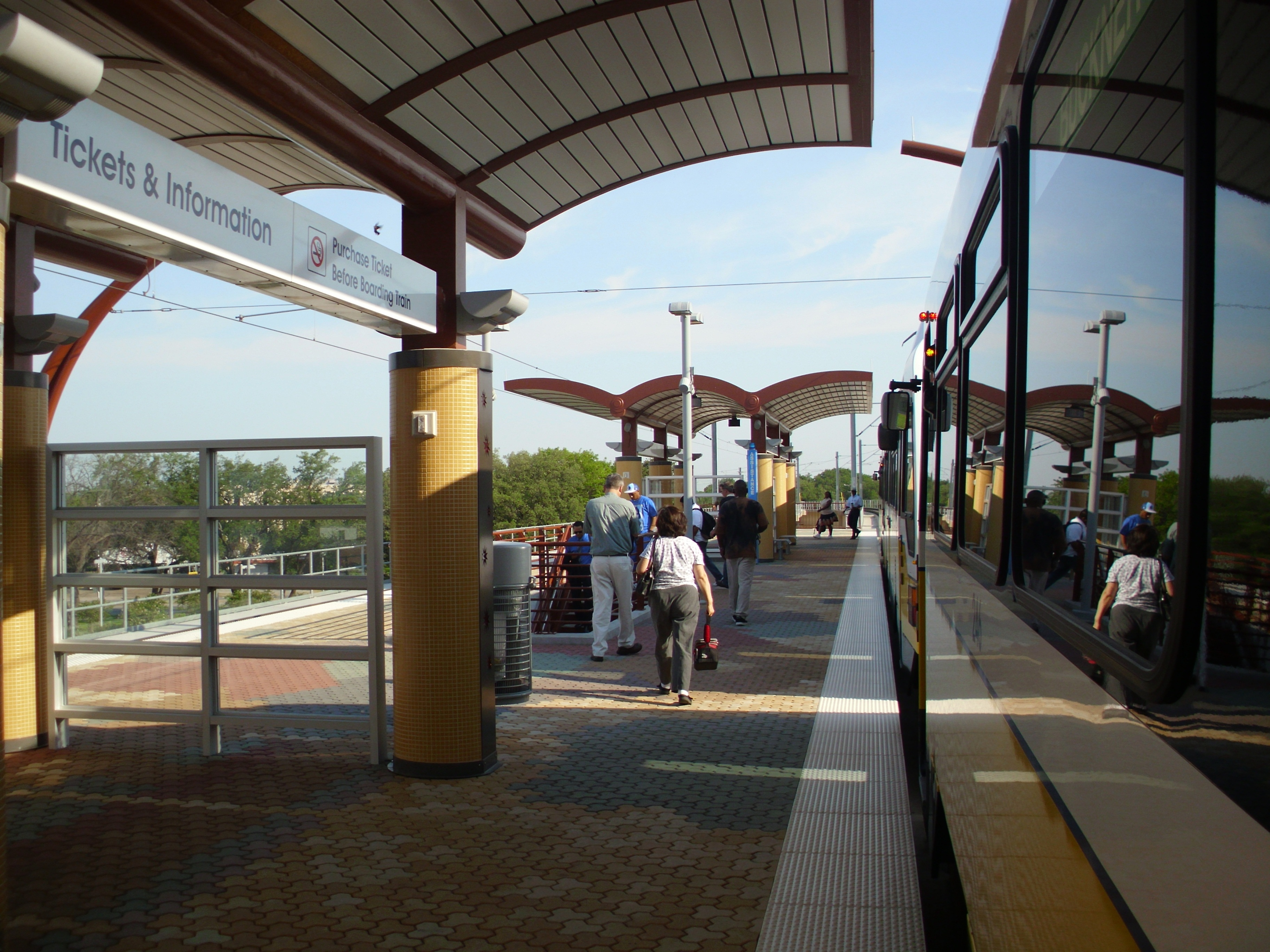
- Green Line train on the platform at Inwood/Love Field station

Overview
- Owner: DART
- Locale: Dallas, Texas
- Termini: North Carrollton/Frankford (north); Buckner (south)
- Stations: 24

Service
- Type: Light rail
- System: DART rail
- Operator: DART
- Rolling stock: SLRV

History
- Opened: September 2009

Technical
- Line length: 27.5 mi (44.3 km)
- Track gauge: 4 ft 8 1/2 in (1,435 mm)
- Electrification: Overhead catenary, 750 V DC
- Highest elevation: At grade, elevated, underground
Route map
Green Line highlighted in green

The Green Line is a 28.6-mile (46.0 km) light rail line in Dallas, United States, operated by the Dallas Area Rapid Transit authority (DART). The US$1.7 billion project opened in phases, starting in 2009. It operates in addition to the Blue, Red, and Orange lines.

== Route ==
The southern terminus of the line is currently at Buckner in southeast Dallas near Buckner Boulevard. The line runs northwest to Fair Park and Deep Ellum, before turning west and running through downtown Dallas. After leaving West End station, the line turns north, running parallel to Interstate 35 past the American Airlines Center. The line then heads northwest, providing service to Southwestern Medical Center, Love Field, and the cities of Farmers Branch and Carrollton, terminating at North Carrollton/Frankford station in Carrollton. Much of the northern end of the line runs in the right of way of the former Missouri–Kansas–Texas Railroad (which was established by the Dallas and Wichita Railroad).

Trinity Mills Station, near the northern terminus, provides a connection with the A-train line run by the Denton County Transportation Authority (DCTA). This line connects Denton to Carrollton, with stops in Lewisville and Highland Village. The commuter train may stop in other Denton County cities, should they choose to join the DCTA.

== History ==
=== Proposals ===
The future Green Line was studied as two separate segments: the Northwest Corridor (from present-day North Carrollton/Frankford to Victory) and the Southeast Corridor (from present-day Deep Ellum to Buckner).

When the Southeast Corridor was originally proposed, two options were considered for the final segment past Lake June Transit Center. One option would utilize an existing Southern Pacific rail corridor paralleling US 175, while the other would create a new corridor along Lake June Road stretching into the Pleasant Grove neighborhood. Both proposals terminated at Buckner Boulevard. The first proposal was ultimately chosen due to higher costs and neighborhood opposition associated with the second.

=== Construction ===
- On February 9, 2007, a trench collapsed during construction on the line killing one construction worker.
- On March 12, 2007, the City of Dallas officials and DART made an agreement to make Burbank Station (formerly Love Field Station) a surface-level facility after a long debate of whether or not to make it an underground station.
- Effective June 17, 2007, the Live Oak exit on (U.S. Route 75) was closed until 2009, as part of the Green Line Rail construction around the Bryan/Hawkins intersection. Two bridges in that area were removed and roads were lowered to street level.
- On June 8, 2009, full-speed tests of the Green Line were conducted successfully with local officials and members of the media aboard. The route of the test included the four stations, then still under construction, that joined the DART rail system in September 2009.

=== Opening ===
The Green Line began operation on September 14, 2009, with a route from downtown Dallas southeast to Fair Park; this short route was scheduled to open in time to service the 2009 State Fair of Texas. On December 6, 2010 the line extended further to Pleasant Grove, as well as continuing northwest from Victory Station to Farmers Branch and Carrollton; both extensions, completing the Green Line.

=== Future plans ===
The D2 Subway has been proposed and would reroute the Green Line's western terminus over the former Blue Line's tracks to terminate at UNT Dallas Station.

== Stations ==
=== Daily Service ===
Listed from east to west and south to north

Station	Other lines	Opened	Notes
Buckner		December 6, 2010	Southeastern terminus
Lake June		December 6, 2010	
Lawnview		December 6, 2010	
Hatcher		December 6, 2010	
MLK Jr.		September 14, 2009	
Fair Park		September 14, 2009	
Baylor University Medical Center		September 14, 2009	
Deep Ellum		September 14, 2009	
Pearl/Arts District	Red Line (DART) Blue Line (DART) Orange Line (DART)	June 14, 1996	Easternmost transfer for Red, Blue and Orange lines
St. Paul	Red Line (DART) Blue Line (DART) Orange Line (DART)	June 14, 1996	Transfer to M-Line Trolley (one block north)
Akard	Red Line (DART) Blue Line (DART) Orange Line (DART)	June 14, 1996	
West End	Red Line (DART) Blue Line (DART) Orange Line (DART)	June 14, 1996	Westernmost transfer station for Red and Blue lines
Victory	Orange Line (DART)	November 13, 2004	Transfer to Trinity Railway Express
Market Center	Orange Line (DART)	December 6, 2010	
Southwestern Medical District/Parkland	Orange Line (DART)	December 6, 2010	
Inwood/Love Field	Orange Line (DART)	December 6, 2010	
Burbank	Orange Line (DART)	December 6, 2010	
Bachman	Orange Line (DART)	December 6, 2010	Westernmost transfer for Orange Line
Walnut Hill/Denton		December 6, 2010	
Royal Lane		December 6, 2010	
Farmers Branch		December 6, 2010	
Downtown Carrollton	Silver Line (DART)	December 6, 2010	Silver Line transfer station
Trinity Mills		December 6, 2010	Transfer to A-train
North Carrollton/Frankford		December 6, 2010	Northwestern terminus

== See also ==
- Texas Interurban Railway – operated commuter service from 1924 to 1932 on the Missouri–Kansas–Texas right-of-way used by the Green Line
