= Buckner station =

DART rail station in Dallas, Texas

Buckner
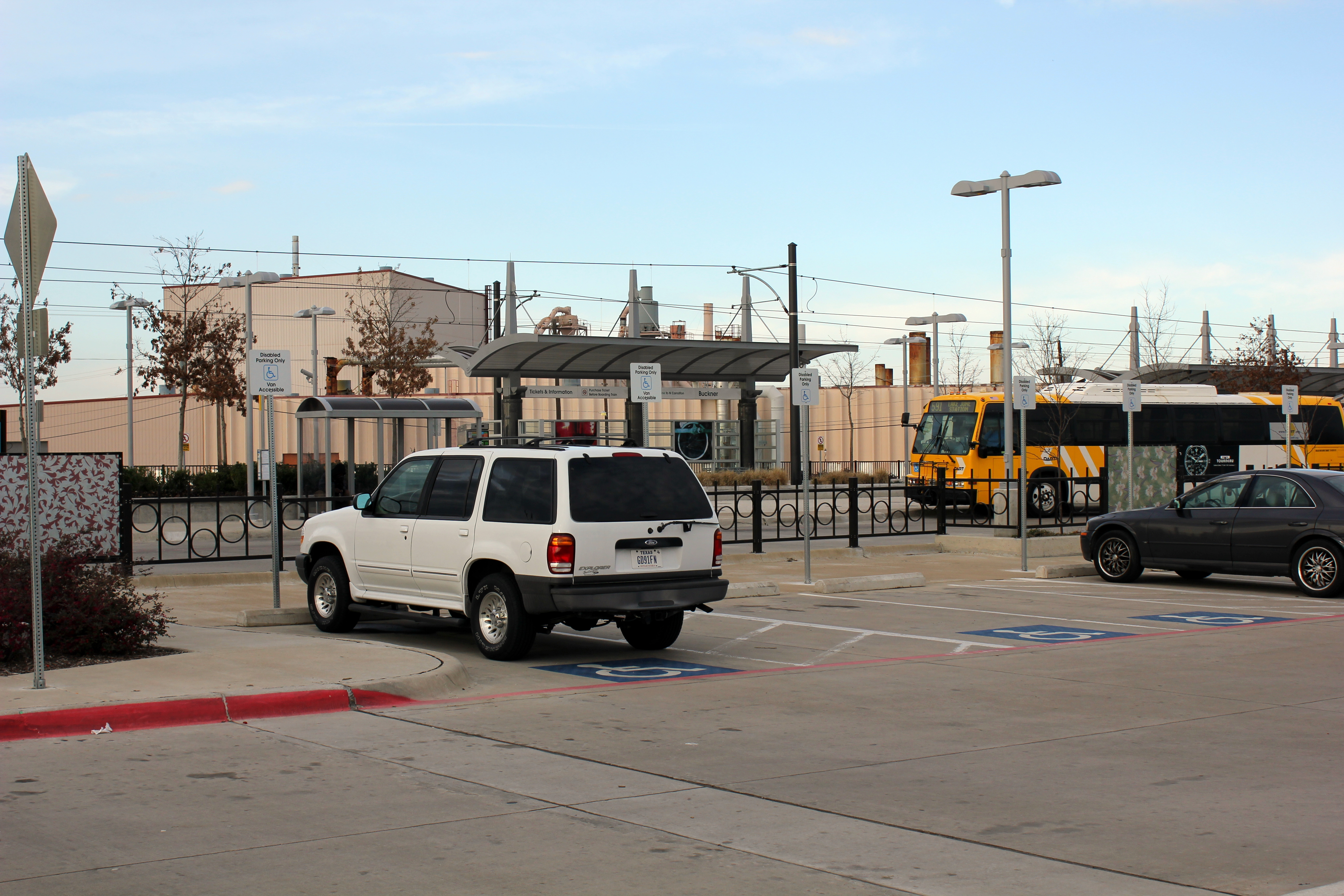

General information
- Location: 8008 Elam Road; Dallas, Texas
- Coordinates: 32°43′06″N 96°41′04″W
- System: DART rail
- Owner: Dallas Area Rapid Transit
- Platforms: Island platform
- Tracks: 2
- Connections: DART: 15, 38; STAR Transit: 101 (M-F) (Note: STAR route 101 only travels to Buckner station by phone or verbal request); Rylie GoLink Zone (M-Sun); Kleberg GoLink Zone (M-F); STARNow Balch Springs (M-F); STARNow Seagoville (M-F)

Construction
- Structure type: At-grade
- Parking: 119 spaces
- Cycle facilities: 2 lockers, 2 racks
- Accessible: Yes

History
- Opened: December 6, 2010

Passengers
- FY 2025: 1,372 (avg. weekday) ▼4.3%

Services
Preceding station	DART	Following station
Lake June toward North Carrollton/Frankford	Green Line	Terminus
Location

Buckner station is a DART rail station located in southeast Dallas, Texas. Located in Pleasant Grove at the intersection of Elam Road and Buckner Boulevard (Loop 12), the station is the southern terminus of the Green Line.

The station primarily serves a residential and industrial corridor in southern Pleasant Grove, with bus routes connecting it to southern Garland, Oak Cliff, and Balch Springs. The station also serves as a transfer point for microtransit to Rylie, Kleberg, and Seagoville.

The station opened as part of the Green Line's second phase on December 6, 2010.
