= North Carrollton/Frankford station =

DART rail station in Carrollton, Texas

North Carrollton/Frankford
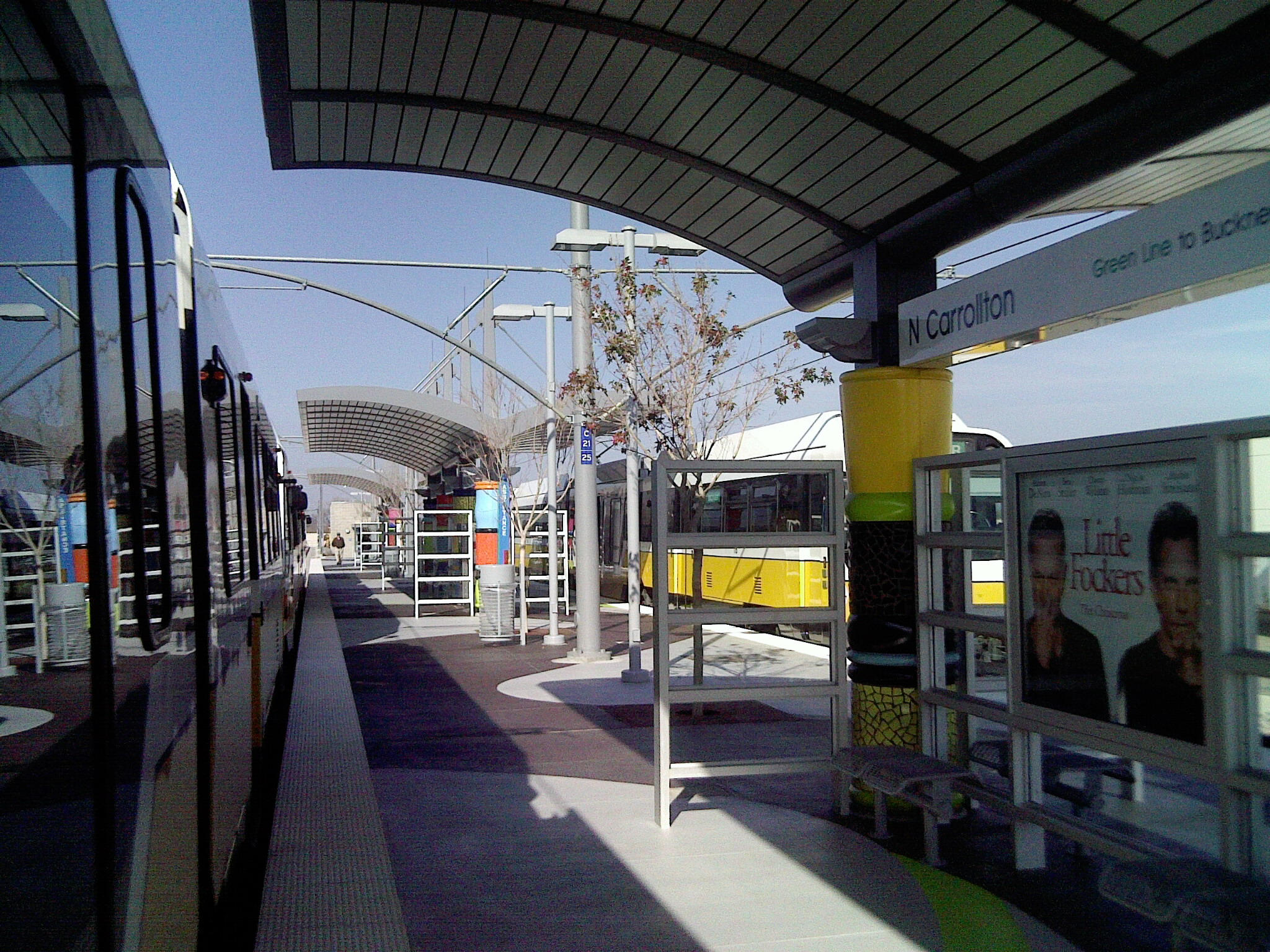
- DART Green Line light rail cars awaiting departure.

General information
- Location: 1717 West Frankford Road; Carrollton, Texas
- Coordinates: 32°59′34″N 96°56′17″W
- System: DART rail
- Owner: Dallas Area Rapid Transit
- Platforms: Island platform
- Tracks: 2
- Connections: Northwest Carrollton GoLink Zone (M-Sun); Lewisville/Highland Village GoZone (M-F)

Construction
- Structure type: At-grade
- Parking: 1,677 spaces
- Cycle facilities: 4 lockers, 1 rack
- Accessible: Yes

History
- Opened: December 6, 2010

Passengers
- FY 2025: 943 (avg. weekday) ▼2.5%

Services
Preceding station	DART	Following station
Terminus	Green Line	Trinity Mills toward Buckner
Location

North Carrollton/Frankford station (sometimes shortened to North Carrollton station) is a DART rail station in Carrollton, Texas that serves as the northern terminus of the Green Line. The station is the only DART facility to be located in Denton County and primarily serves as a park-and-ride.

The station is adjacent to the right-of-way for the A-train commuter rail line, but the A-train does not stop at North Carrollton/Frankford. Instead, it meets with the Green Line at Trinity Mills, one station to the south.

== History ==
The station was first proposed in 2000 in a study of the "Northwest Corridor", which included the modern-day Green Line and Orange Line. In these proposals, the station was simply named "Frankford" after Frankford Road.

In 2002, the city of Carrollton passed a resolution proposing names for the three stations in the city. This proposal renamed the Frankford Road station to "North Carrollton" with the specific aim of ensuring that the name "Carrollton" would appear on the line's destination signs.

In 2004, following the proposal of the A-train, the city of Carrollton debated removing North Carrollton/Frankford from the line. The station was primarily intended as a park-and-ride lot for Denton County residents commuting to Downtown Dallas, but the A-train (which did not stop at the station) would serve the same purpose.

The station was opened on December 6, 2010 with the rest of the northern Green Line.

On April 2, 2012, DART began a pilot program known as "Fair Share Parking", which required commuters from non-DART member cities to pay a $2 fee for parking. North Carrollton/Frankford was one of two stations to be included in the program at launch, the other being Parker Road. The proposal was intended to improve parking availability and to make up for the lack of sales tax revenue from non-residents. However, most commuters simply switched to parking at other stations; in North Carrollton/Frankford's case, most commuters moved to Trinity Mills. After the pilot program failed to make a profit, DART opted to end it. North Carrollton/Frankford reverted to free parking on April 2, 2014.
