= List of DART rail stations =

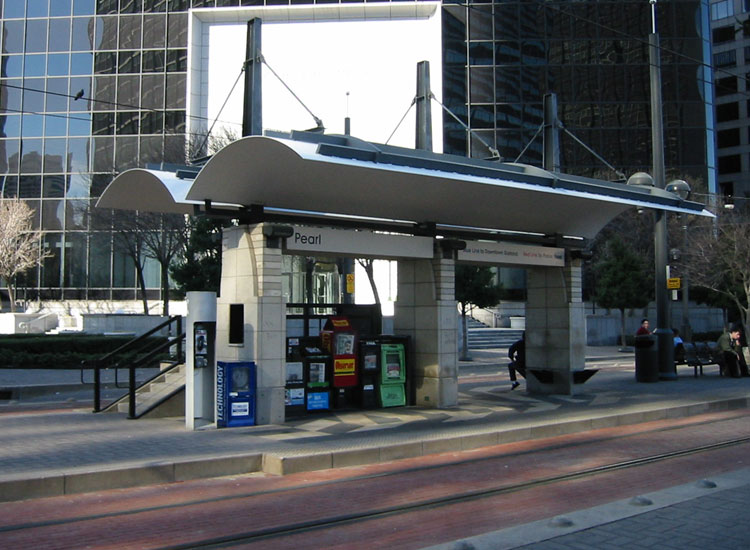
Pearl/Arts District station

The DART rail system, operated by Dallas Area Rapid Transit, serves portions of the Dallas–Fort Worth metroplex, Texas, United States. The network consists of seventy-three stations on five lines; the Red Line, the Blue Line, the Green Line, the Orange Line, and the Silver Line.

All but one of the stations along the DART network are open-air structures featuring passenger canopies for protection from adverse weather conditions. Stations with side platforms typically have dimensions of 300 feet (91 m) long by 17 feet (5.2 m) wide, while stations with an island platform typically have dimensions of 300 feet (91 m) long by 28 feet (8.5 m) wide. The lone underground station is Cityplace/Uptown.

All stations include works of public art as part of the DART Station Art & Design Program. These works can be independent or incorporated into the canopies, columns, pavers, windscreens, fencing and landscaping of the stations.

== Stations ==
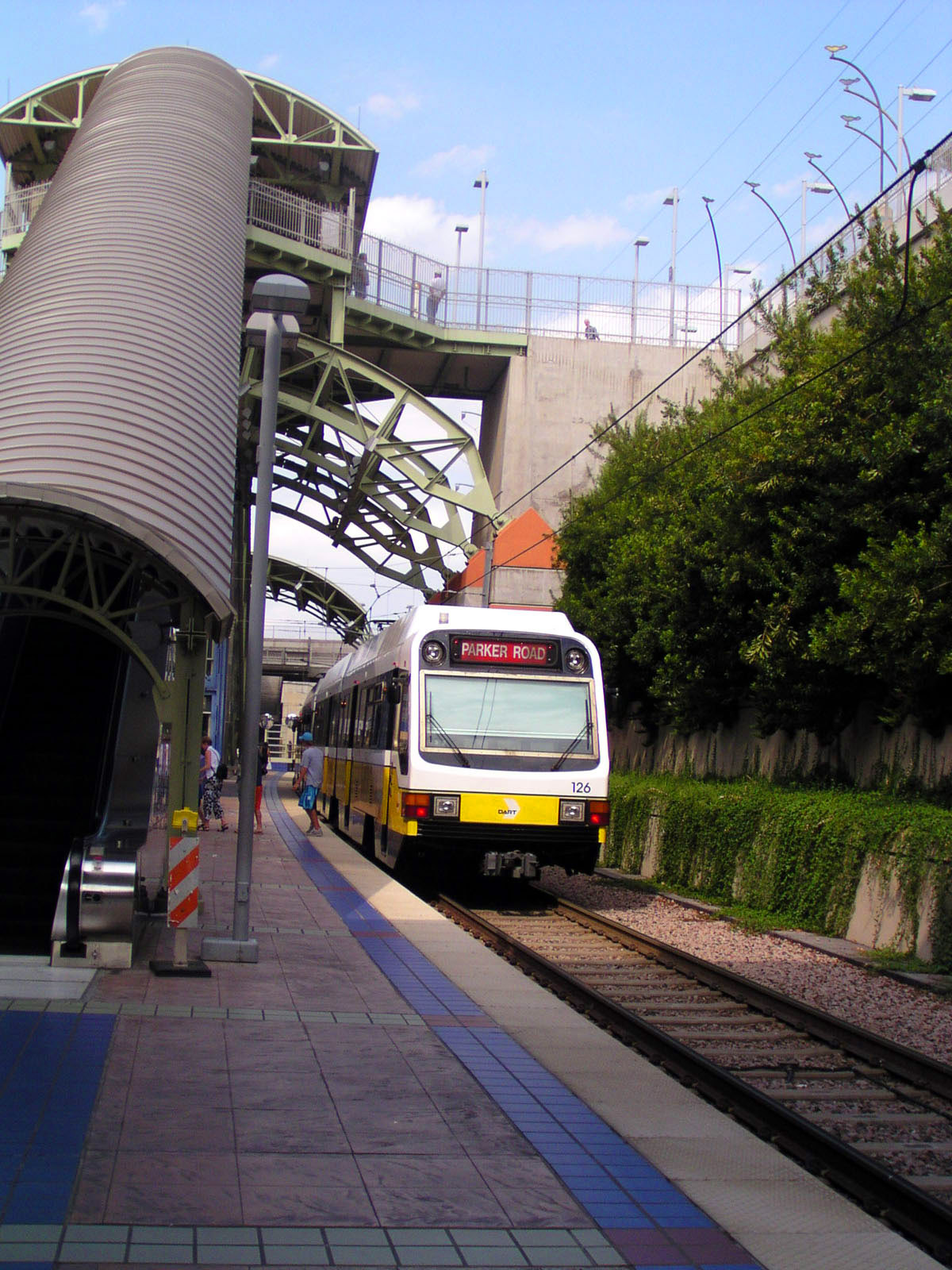
A northbound train at SMU/Mockingbird Station

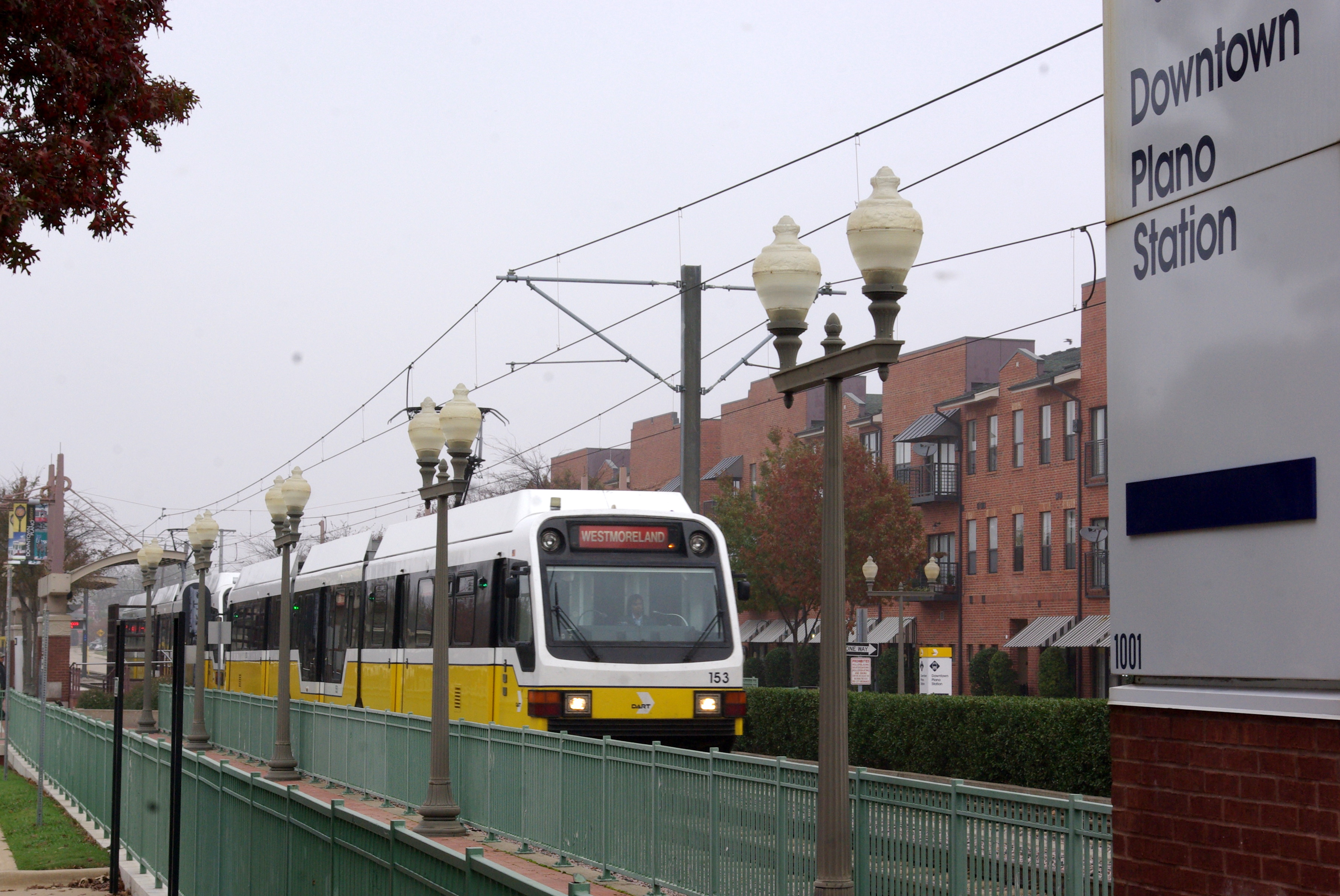
Train arriving at Downtown Plano Station

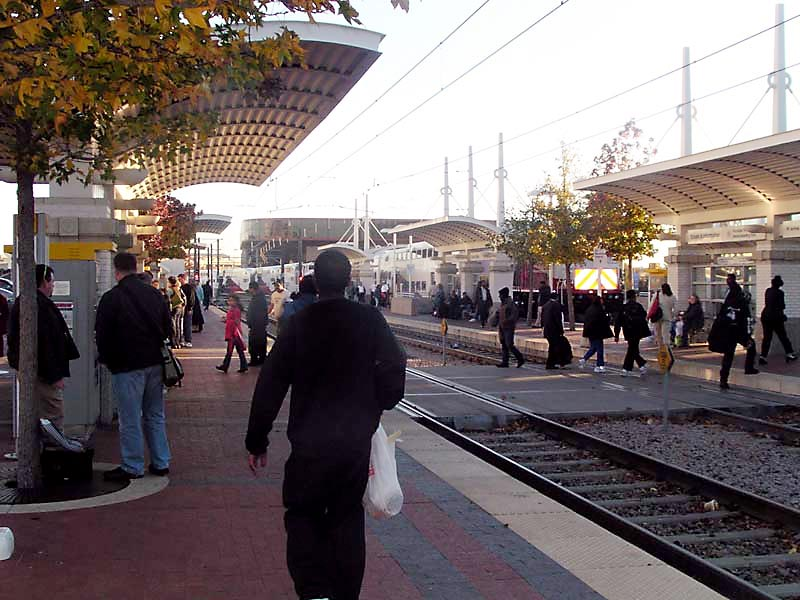
Passengers at EBJ Union Station

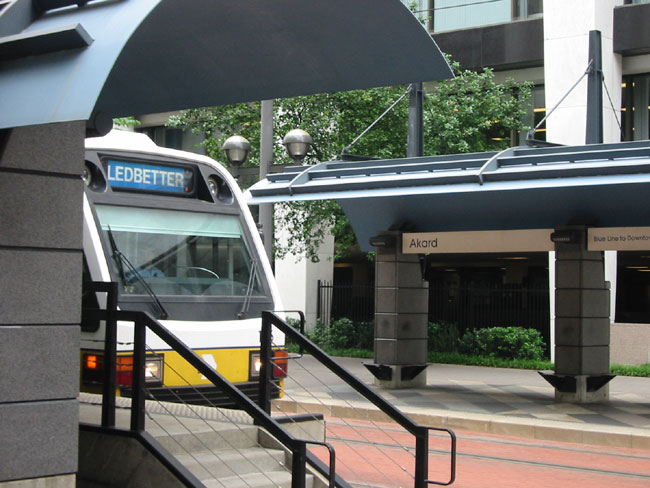
Southbound Blue Line train at Akard Station

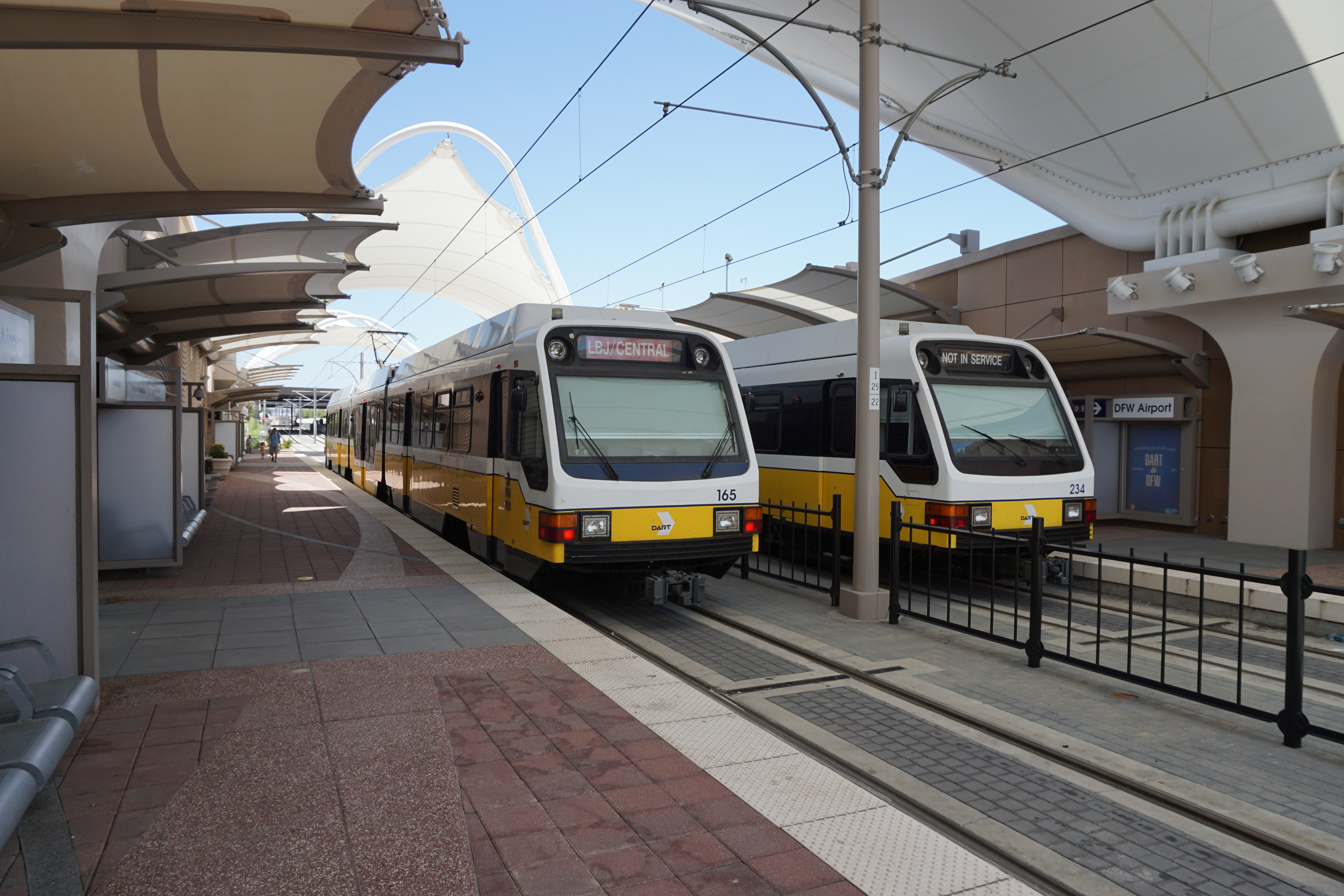
In-service and out-of-service Orange Line trains at DFW Airport Terminal A station

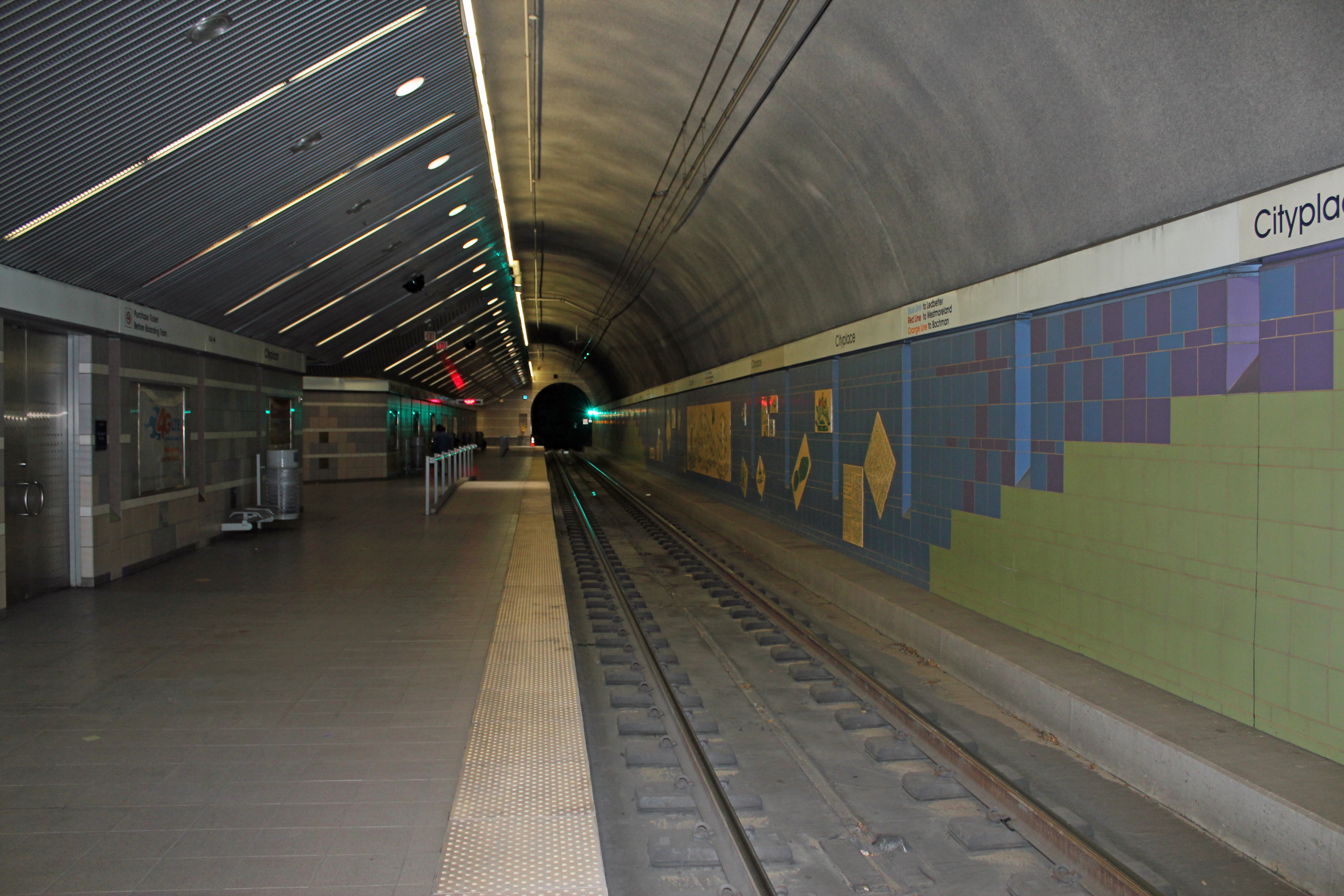
Inbound platform at Cityplace/Uptown station, the only operational underground station in the system.

*	Official transfer stations
†	Terminal stations
‡	Temporarily closed

Station	Lines	Jurisdiction	Opened	Reference
8th & Corinth*	Red Line; Blue Line	Dallas	June 14, 1996	
12th Street*	Red Line; Orange Line (Note: Orange Line service only during weekday peak periods); Silver Line	Plano	October 25, 2025	
Addison	Silver Line	Addison	October 25, 2025	
Akard	Red Line; Blue Line; Green Line; Orange Line	Dallas	June 14, 1996	
Arapaho Center	Red Line; Orange Line	Richardson	July 1, 2002	
Bachman*	Green Line; Orange Line	Dallas	December 6, 2010	
Baylor University Medical Center	Green Line	Dallas	September 14, 2009	
Belt Line	Orange Line	Irving	December 3, 2012	
Buckner†	Green Line	Dallas	December 6, 2010	
Burbank	Green Line; Orange Line	Dallas	December 6, 2010	
Camp Wisdom	Blue Line	Dallas	October 24, 2016	
Cedars	Red Line; Blue Line	Dallas	June 14, 1996	
CityLine/Bush	Red Line; Orange Line; Silver Line	Richardson	December 9, 2002	
Cityplace/Uptown (Note: Transfer to M-Line Trolley available)	Red Line; Blue Line; Orange Line	Dallas	December 18, 2000	
Convention Center‡ (Note: Closed until 2029 due to renovations to the Kay Bailey Hutchison Convention Center)	Red Line; Blue Line	Dallas	June 14, 1996	
Cypress Waters	Silver Line	Dallas (Note: located in an exclave of Dallas near Coppell)	October 25, 2025	
DFW Airport North* (Note: Transfer to TEXRail available)	Silver Line	Grapevine	October 25, 2025	
DFW Airport Terminal A† (Note: connected to DFW Airport Terminal B via pedestrian walkway)	Orange Line	DFW Airport	August 18, 2014	
DFW Airport Terminal B† (Note: connected to DFW Airport Terminal A via pedestrian walkway)	Silver Line	DFW Airport	October 25, 2025	
Dallas College North Lake Campus	Orange Line	Irving	December 3, 2012	
Dallas Zoo	Red Line	Dallas	June 14, 1996	
Deep Ellum	Green Line	Dallas	September 14, 2009	
Downtown Carrollton	Green Line; Silver Line	Carrollton	December 6, 2010	
Downtown Garland	Blue Line	Garland	November 18, 2002	
Downtown Plano	Red Line; Orange Line	Plano	December 9, 2002	
Downtown Rowlett†	Blue Line	Rowlett	December 3, 2012	
EBJ Union Station* (Note: Transfers to Amtrak, Dallas Streetcar, and Trinity Railway Express available)	Red Line; Blue Line	Dallas	June 14, 1996	
Fair Park	Green Line	Dallas	September 14, 2009	
Farmers Branch	Green Line	Farmers Branch	December 6, 2010	
Forest/Jupiter	Blue Line	Garland	November 18, 2002	
Forest Lane	Red Line; Orange Line	Dallas	July 1, 2002	
Galatyn Park	Red Line; Orange Line	Richardson	July 1, 2002	
Hampton	Red Line	Dallas	June 14, 1996	
Hatcher	Green Line	Dallas	December 6, 2010	
Hidden Ridge	Orange Line	Irving	April 12, 2021	
Illinois	Blue Line	Dallas	June 14, 1996	
Inwood/Love Field	Green Line; Orange Line	Dallas	December 6, 2010	
Irving Convention Center	Orange Line	Irving	July 30, 2012	
Kiest	Blue Line	Dallas	May 31, 1997	
Knoll Trail	Silver Line	Dallas	October 25, 2025	
Lake Highlands	Blue Line	Dallas	December 6, 2010	
Lake June	Green Line	Dallas	December 6, 2010	
Las Colinas Urban Center	Orange Line	Irving	July 30, 2012	
Lawnview	Green Line	Dallas	December 6, 2010	
LBJ/Central*	Red Line; Orange Line	Dallas	July 1, 2002	
LBJ/Skillman	Blue Line	Dallas	May 6, 2002	
Ledbetter	Blue Line	Dallas	May 31, 1997	
Lovers Lane	Red Line; Orange Line	Dallas	January 10, 1997	
Market Center	Green Line; Orange Line	Dallas	December 6, 2010	
MLK, Jr.	Green Line	Dallas	September 14, 2009	
Morrell	Blue Line	Dallas	June 14, 1996	
North Carrollton/Frankford†	Green Line	Carrollton	December 6, 2010	
Park Lane	Red Line; Orange Line	Dallas	January 10, 1997	
Parker Road†	Red Line; Orange Line	Plano	December 9, 2002	
Pearl/Arts District*	Red Line; Blue Line; Green Line; Orange Line	Dallas	June 14, 1996	
Royal Lane	Green Line	Dallas	December 6, 2010	
Shiloh Road†	Silver Line	Plano	October 25, 2025	
SMU/Mockingbird*	Red Line; Blue Line; Orange Line	Dallas	January 10, 1997	
Southwestern Medical District/Parkland	Green Line; Orange Line	Dallas	December 6, 2010	
Spring Valley	Red Line; Orange Line	Richardson	July 1, 2002	
St. Paul	Red Line; Blue Line; Green Line; Orange Line	Dallas	June 14, 1996	
Trinity Mills*	Green Line	Carrollton	December 6, 2010	
Tyler/Vernon	Red Line	Dallas	June 14, 1996	
University of Dallas	Orange Line	Irving	July 30, 2012	
UNT Dallas†	Blue Line	Dallas	October 24, 2016	
UT Dallas	Silver Line	Richardson	October 25, 2025	
VA Medical Center	Blue Line	Dallas	May 31, 1997	
Victory* (Note: Transfer to Trinity Railway Express available)	Green Line; Orange Line	Dallas	September 14, 2009	
Walnut Hill	Red Line; Orange Line	Dallas	July 1, 2002	
Walnut Hill/Denton	Green Line	Dallas	December 6, 2010	
West End*	Red Line; Blue Line; Green Line; Orange Line	Dallas	June 14, 1996	
Westmoreland†	Red Line	Dallas	June 14, 1996	
White Rock	Blue Line	Dallas	September 24, 2001	

== Deferred stations ==
Four DART stations were included in initial plans for their respective branches but never built. One was excavated but never completed due to neighborhood opposition, while three others were deferred pending development in the surrounding area. These stations may be built in the future, but they are not included in DART's current long-term plans.

Station	Lines	Jurisdiction	Reference
Knox–Henderson	Red Line; Blue Line; Orange Line	Dallas	
Loop 12	Orange Line	Irving	
Plano Road	Blue Line	Dallas	
South Las Colinas	Orange Line	Irving	

=== D2 Subway ===
The D2 Subway is a proposed subway tunnel under Downtown Dallas for the Blue Line and Orange Line. It would service four new stations. The project was originally planned for completion in 2028 but was put on indefinite hiatus in 2023.

Station	Lines	Jurisdiction	Reference
CBD East	Blue Line; Orange Line	Dallas	
Commerce	Blue Line; Orange Line	Dallas	
Metro Center	Blue Line; Orange Line	Dallas	
Museum Way	Blue Line; Orange Line	Dallas	
