= Knox–Henderson station =

Proposed subway station in Dallas, Texas

Knox–Henderson

General information
- Location: Dallas, Texas
- Coordinates: 32°49′13″N 96°47′11″W
- System: DART rail
- Owner: Dallas Area Rapid Transit

Construction
- Structure type: Underground

Other information
- Status: Deferred indefinitely

Services
| Preceding station | DART | Following station |
|---|---|---|
| Cityplace/Uptown toward UNT Dallas | Blue Line | SMU/Mockingbird toward Downtown Rowlett |
| Cityplace/Uptown toward DFW Airport Terminal A | Orange Line | SMU/Mockingbird toward LBJ/Central or Parker Road |
| Cityplace/Uptown toward Westmoreland | Red Line | SMU/Mockingbird toward Parker Road |
Location

Knox–Henderson station is a proposed DART rail station that would serve the Knox-Henderson and Vickery Place neighborhoods of Dallas, Texas. The station would be located in an underground tunnel at the intersection of North Central Expressway (US 75) and Knox Street, and it would serve the Red Line, Orange Line, and Blue Line.

During construction of the North Central Expressway subway in the 1990s, the area that would contain the Knox-Henderson station platforms was excavated. However, the station itself was never built due to opposition from Vickery Place residents, and proposals to resume construction have been unsuccessful due to high costs. As of 2024, DART does not list the station in its future expansion plans, and the excavated platforms serve primarily as an emergency exit.

== History ==
=== Planning and excavation ===
In 1985, DART announced plans to construct a rail tunnel under North Central Expressway between Downtown Dallas and Mockingbird Lane. Preliminary plans for the tunnel included two underground stations, one at Cityplace and one at Knox-Henderson. However, substantial opposition from the nearby Vickery Place neighborhood resulted in the Knox-Henderson station being removed from the plan. The Cityplace station was completed as planned and opened on December 18, 2000.

When constructing the North Central tunnel in the 1990s DART opted to excavate a potential station site for Knox-Henderson at a $1 million cost. The excavated area is located 80 feet (24 m) below ground level and contains a 400-foot (120 m) platform, a ventilation shaft, and a maintenance stairwell. Due to the constructed but unused nature of these platforms, the excavated area is sometimes considered a ghost station.

=== Further developments ===
By the mid-1990s, attitudes towards the station began to shift. Vickery Place, which had previously been opposed to any redevelopment in the area, began actively petitioning DART to construct the station. However, DART was unable to commit to the project, which would cost $40-50 million, due to having higher-priority projects such as rail extensions to northern suburbs.

In 2006, DART announced that the cost for the station had increased to $100 million. This increase was attributed to high labor and infrastructure costs: to prevent interference with existing rail service, work could only be carried out between midnight and 4 AM, when trains were not running. Due to this, as well as concerns that an additional station would increase travel times, DART stated that it would defer construction of the station indefinitely.

In January 2007, DART published its comprehensive 2030 Transit System Plan, which described all future projects DART would commit to over the next 20 years. In a record of comments on the plan, which included one in support of Knox-Henderson, a DART representative stated that "There are no plans for a station in the Knox-Henderson area." The station was also excluded from DART's 2045 Transit System Plan, published in 2022.
