= VA Medical Center station (DART) =

DART rail station in Dallas, Texas

VA Medical Center
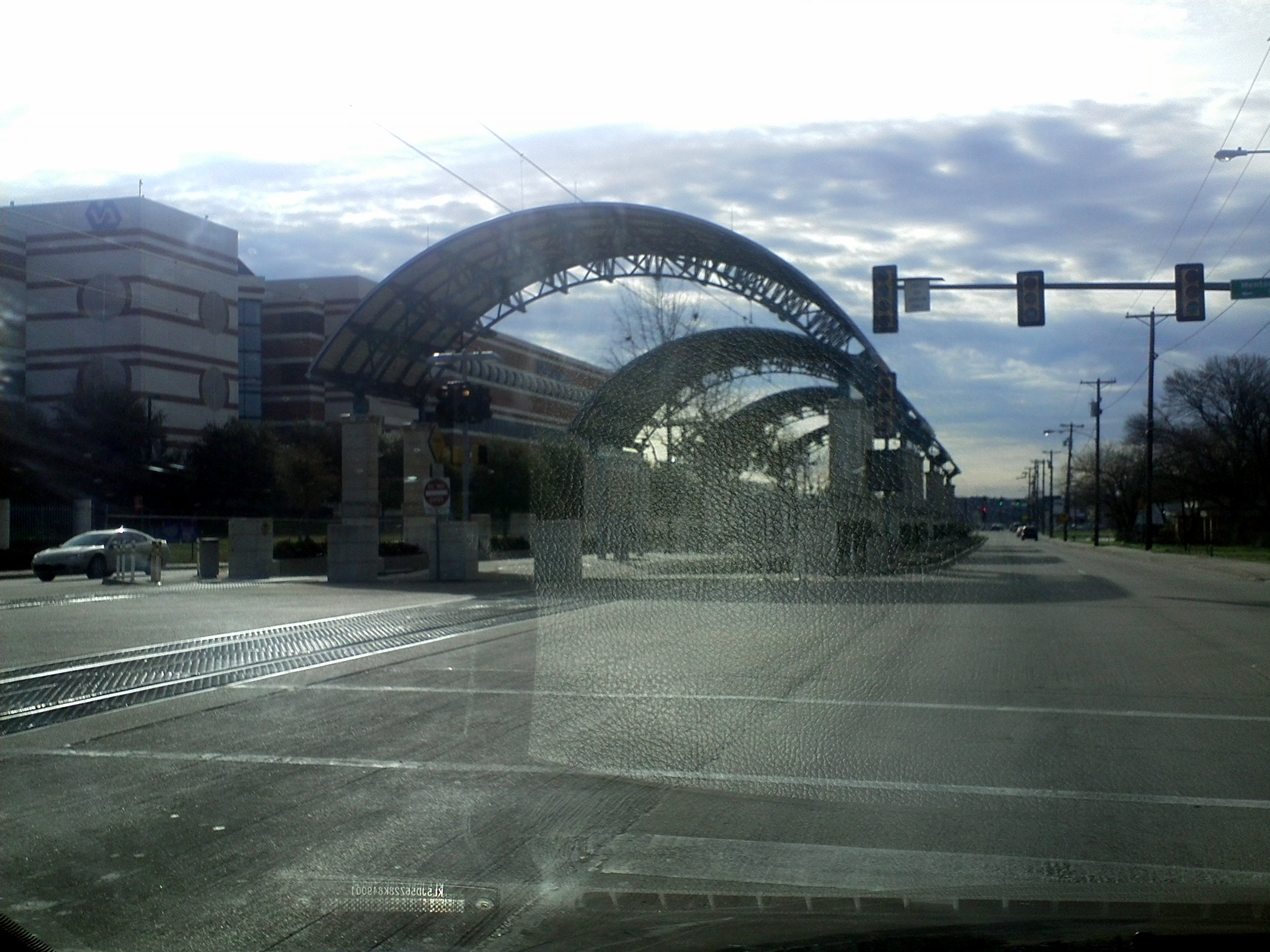

General information
- Location: 4510 South Lancaster Rd. Dallas, Texas
- Coordinates: 32°41′37″N 96°47′34″W
- System: DART rail
- Owner: Dallas Area Rapid Transit
- Platforms: 2 side platforms
- Tracks: 2
- Connections: DART: 217

Construction
- Accessible: Yes

History
- Opened: May 31, 1997

Passengers
- FY 2025: 449 (avg. weekday) ▼2.6%

Services
Preceding station	DART	Following station
Ledbetter toward UNT Dallas	Blue Line	Kiest toward Downtown Rowlett
Location

VA Medical Center station is a DART rail station in Dallas, Texas. The station is located in the median of Lancaster Road (SH 342) at the entrance to the Dallas Veterans Affairs Medical Center and serves the Blue Line.

As of the 2025 fiscal year, the station has the lowest weekend ridership of all Blue Line stations, with an average of 200 riders on Saturdays and 159 riders on Sundays.

The station opened on May 31, 1997.
