= White Rock station =

DART rail station in Dallas, Texas

White Rock
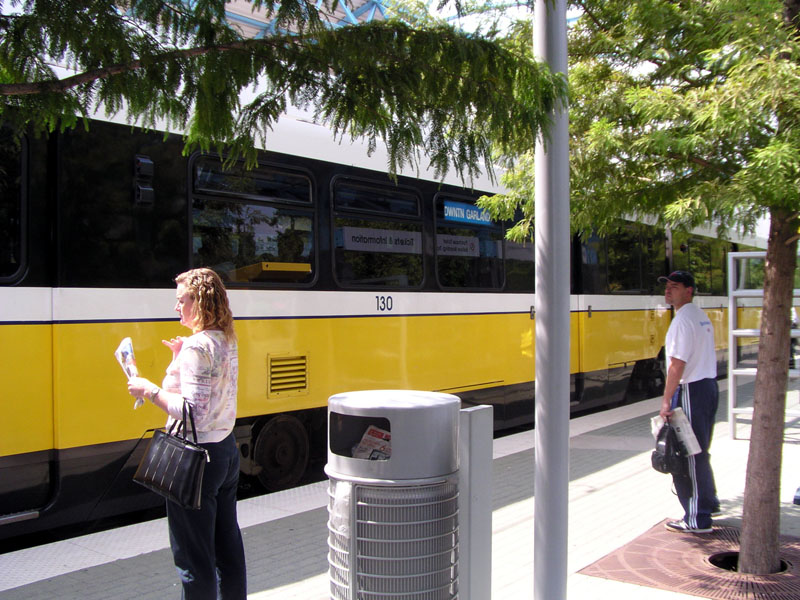
- Passengers at White Rock station

General information
- Location: 7333 East Northwest Highway; Dallas, Texas
- Coordinates: 32.855914°N 96.732701°W
- System: DART rail
- Owner: Dallas Area Rapid Transit
- Platforms: Two side platforms
- Connections: DART: 20, Lake Highlands GoLink Zone (M-F), White Rock Creek Trail

Construction
- Parking: 496 spaces
- Cycle facilities: 6 lockers, 4 racks
- Accessible: Yes

History
- Opened: September 24, 2001

Services
Preceding station	DART	Following station
SMU/Mockingbird toward UNT Dallas	Blue Line	Lake Highlands toward Downtown Rowlett
Location

White Rock station is a DART rail station in Dallas, Texas. The station serves the Blue Line. Located on Northwest Highway (Loop 12) in East Dallas, the station serves the Lakewood neighborhood and White Rock Lake.

The station directly connects to the White Rock Creek Trail, which in turn connects the station to White Rock Lake, Flag Pole Hill Park, and the SoPac Trail.

== History ==
In 1997, DART purchased a Knights of Columbus lodge for use as a station site, which was tentatively named Northwest Highway.

Construction on the site began on January 15, 1999 as part of a larger extension between Mockingbird station and Garland. The station was designed to evoke historic architecture around White Rock Lake, including a faux-spillway filled with landscaping and columns in the style of the White Rock Lake boathouse.

A test run of the 3.1 miles (5.0 km) of track between Mockingbird and White Rock was completed in July 2001. White Rock station opened three months later on September 24, 2001. It served as the northern terminus of the Blue Line until May 2002, when the line was extended to LBJ/Skillman.

In 2002, Dallas received $10.9 million in federal funding to extend the Katy Trail to White Rock station.
