= Illinois station (DART) =

DART rail station in Dallas, Texas

Illinois
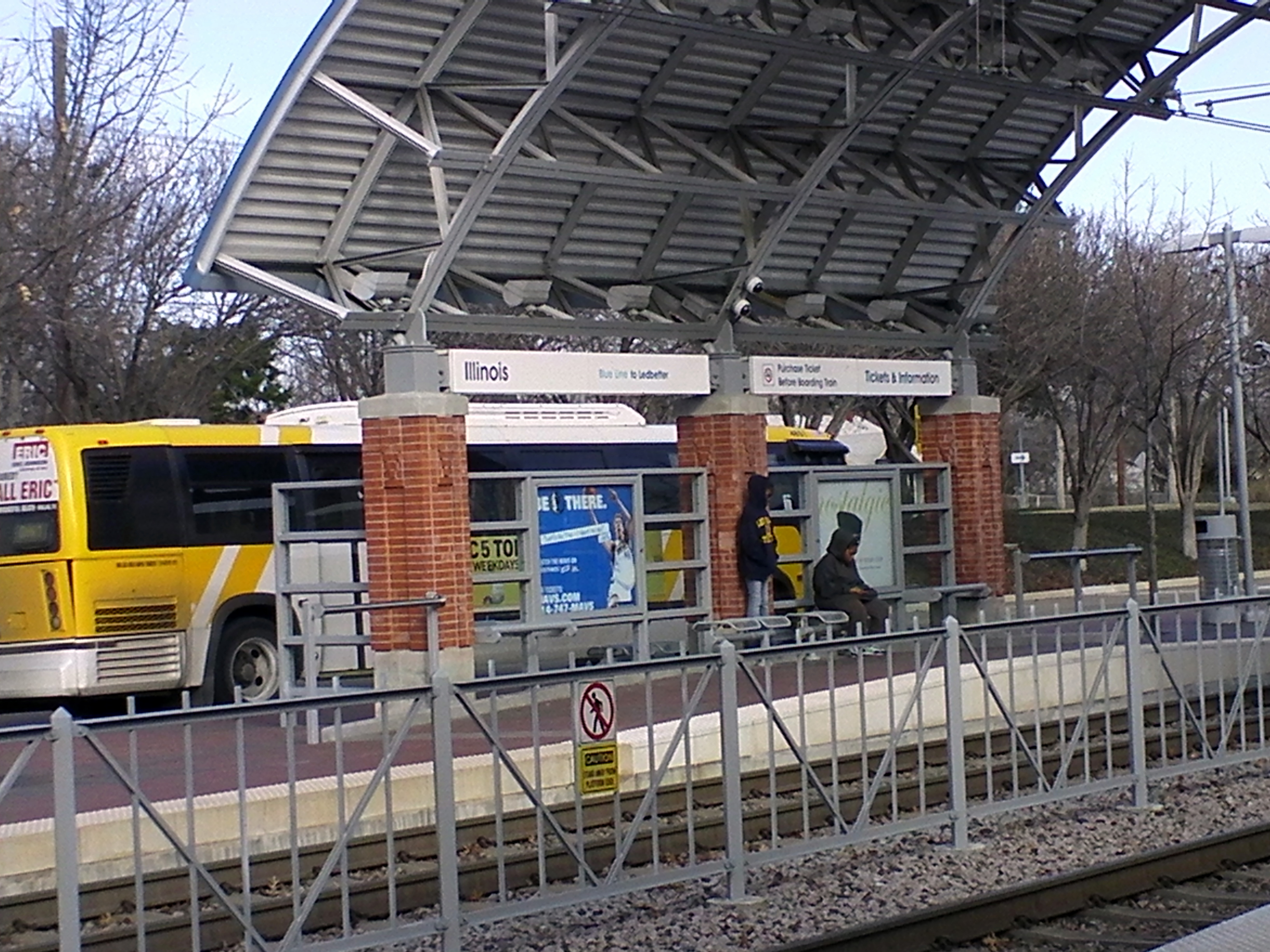

General information
- Location: 2111 South Corinth Road; Dallas, Texas
- Coordinates: 32°43′23″N 96°48′19″W
- System: DART rail
- Owner: Dallas Area Rapid Transit
- Platforms: 2 side platforms
- Tracks: 2
- Connections: DART: 104, 114, 141, 217

Construction
- Structure type: At-grade
- Parking: 350 spaces
- Cycle facilities: 2 lockers, 1 rack
- Accessible: Yes

History
- Opened: June 14, 1996

Services
Preceding station	DART	Following station
Kiest toward UNT Dallas	Blue Line	Morrell toward Downtown Rowlett
Location

Illinois station is a DART rail station in Oak Cliff, Dallas, Texas. The station is located on Denley Drive near its intersection with Illinois Avenue. It serves the Blue Line, as well as four bus routes. Unlike most DART rail stations, Illinois features an indoor waiting area.

The station primarily serves residential neighborhoods in the Cedar Crest area. DART's police department is headquartered near the station in the historic Monroe Shops building. The station's bus routes provide connections to various Oak Cliff neighborhoods, Dallas College Mountain View Campus, and Fair Park (via J.B. Jackson Jr. Transit Center).

== History ==
The station was opened with the DART rail system on June 14, 1996. It served as the initial southern terminus of the Blue Line until the line was extended to Ledbetter in 1997.
