= Morrell station =

DART rail station in Dallas, Texas

Morrell
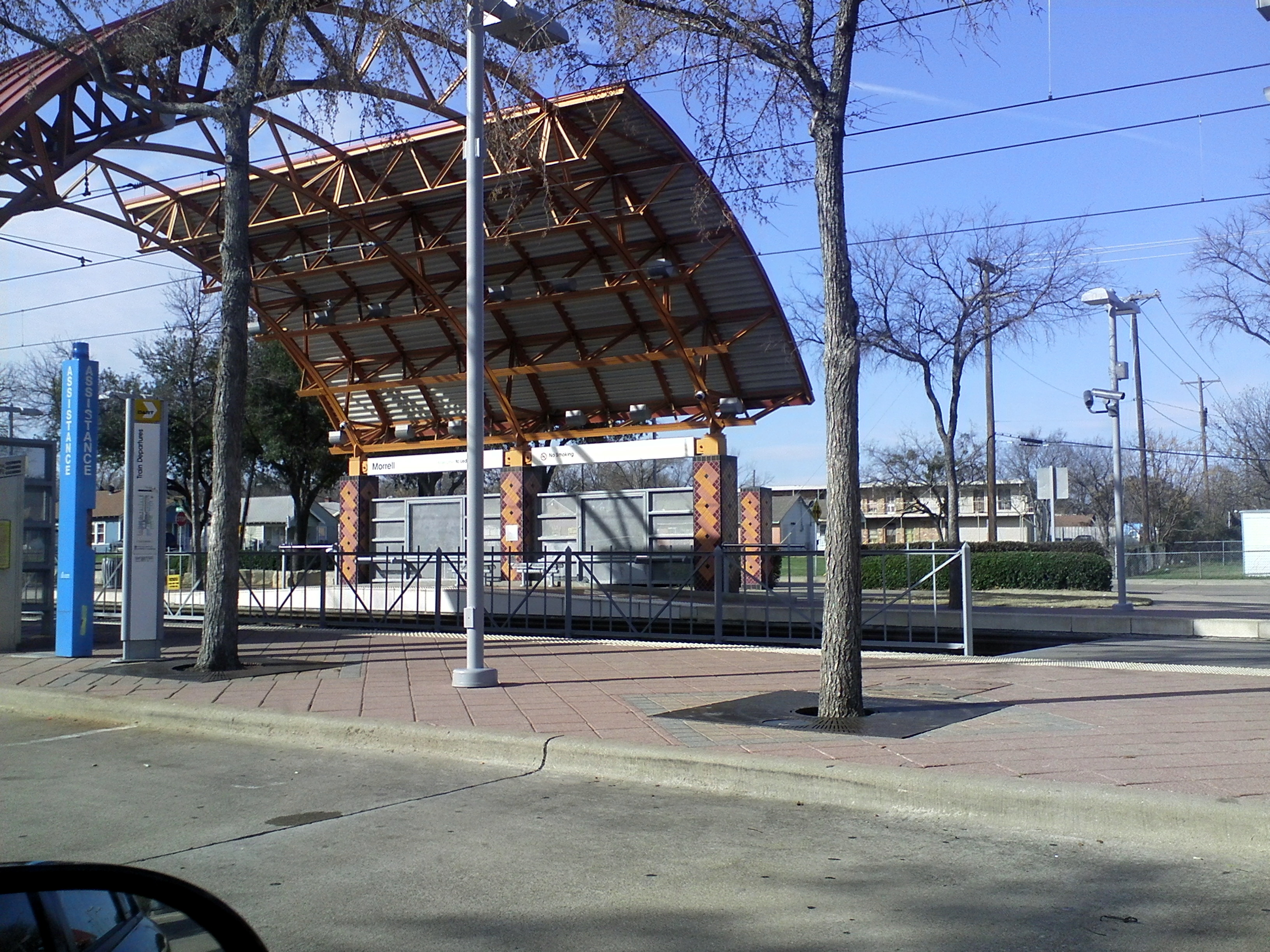

General information
- Location: 1633 Morrell Avenue; Dallas, Texas 75203
- Coordinates: 32°44′23″N 96°48′9″W
- System: DART light rail station
- Owner: Dallas Area Rapid Transit
- Platforms: Two side platforms

Construction
- Cycle facilities: Two lockers, two racks
- Accessible: Yes

History
- Opened: June 14, 1996

Services
Preceding station	DART	Following station
Illinois toward UNT Dallas	Blue Line	8th & Corinth toward Downtown Rowlett
Location

Morrell station is a DART rail station located in Dallas, Texas. It is located at Morrell and Woodbine Avenues in the Oak Cliff neighborhood. It opened on June 14, 1996, and serves the Blue Line, serving nearby residences, businesses, and the nearby Dallas Zoo. This is the first station outbound after the Blue Line diverges from the Red Line.
