= Lake Highlands station =

DART rail station in the Lake Highlands neighborhood of Dallas, Texas

Lake Highlands
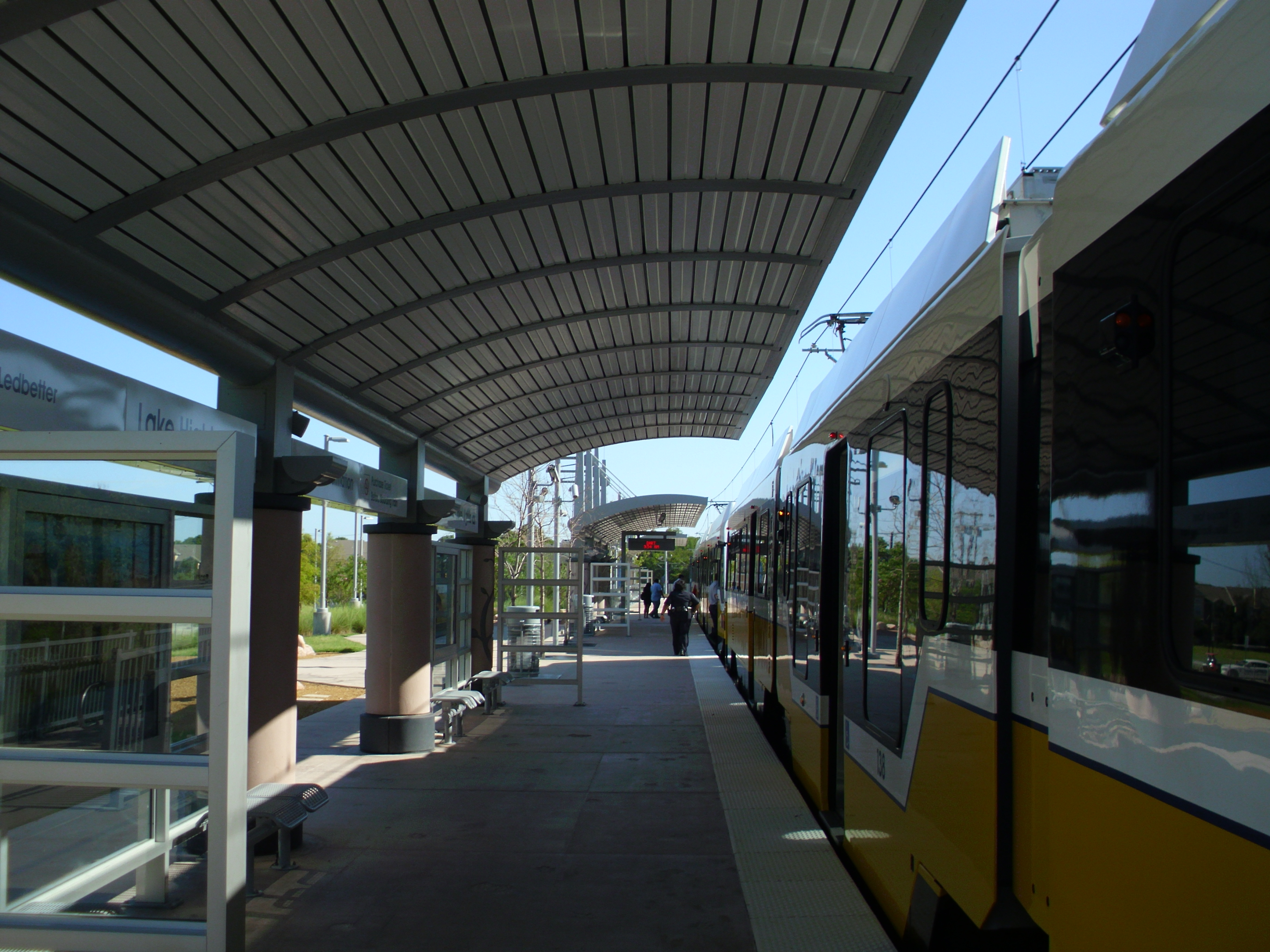
- Passengers getting on and off a Blue Line train at Lake Highlands station.

General information
- Location: 9393 Whistle Stop Place; Dallas, Texas 75231
- Coordinates: 32.880056°N 96.730328°W
- System: DART rail
- Owner: Dallas Area Rapid Transit
- Platforms: Two side platforms
- Connections: DART: 17 242, Lake Highlands GoLink Zone (M-F)

Construction
- Parking: 68 spaces
- Cycle facilities: 1 bike rack
- Accessible: Yes

History
- Opened: December 6, 2010

Passengers
- FY 2025: 375 (avg. weekday) ▲3%

Services
Preceding station	DART	Following station
White Rock toward UNT Dallas	Blue Line	LBJ/Skillman toward Downtown Rowlett
Location

Lake Highlands station is a DART rail station in the Lake Highlands neighborhood of Dallas, Texas. The station serves the Blue Line.

The station is located near the intersection of Skillman Street and Walnut Hill Lane at the Lake Highlands Town Center development. The station is about 0.5 miles (0.80 km) south of Lake Highlands High School and the Lake Highlands Recreation Center, both of which it is connected to via the Lake Highlands Trail.

As of the 2025 fiscal year, the station has the lowest weekday ridership of all Blue Line stations, with an average of 375 riders per day.

== History ==
Plans for the Northeast Corridor, which became the northern leg of the Blue Line, included a station in Lake Highlands under the name Kingsley Road. (Note: Kingsley Road was renamed Walnut Hill Lane in 2005.) While concepts were created for the station, it was not built with the rest of the corridor due to traffic capacity issues on White Rock Trail Road (which would house the station entrance), a junior high school being planned nearby, and neighborhood opposition.

In 2005, Dallas created a tax increment financing district for Lake Highlands Town Center, a proposed 769-acre mixed-use development adjacent to the proposed station site. The following year, DART allocated $10 million towards constructing the station. Unlike in the original plan, the station entrance is located on Skillman Street. It was the first infill station to be built by DART.

The station opened on December 6, 2010, concurrent with the opening of most of the Green Line. Lake Highlands Town Center, which had been delayed following the Great Recession, would not open until 2014 following a management change and substantial redesigns.
