= Forest/Jupiter station =

DART rail station in Garland, Texas

Forest/Jupiter
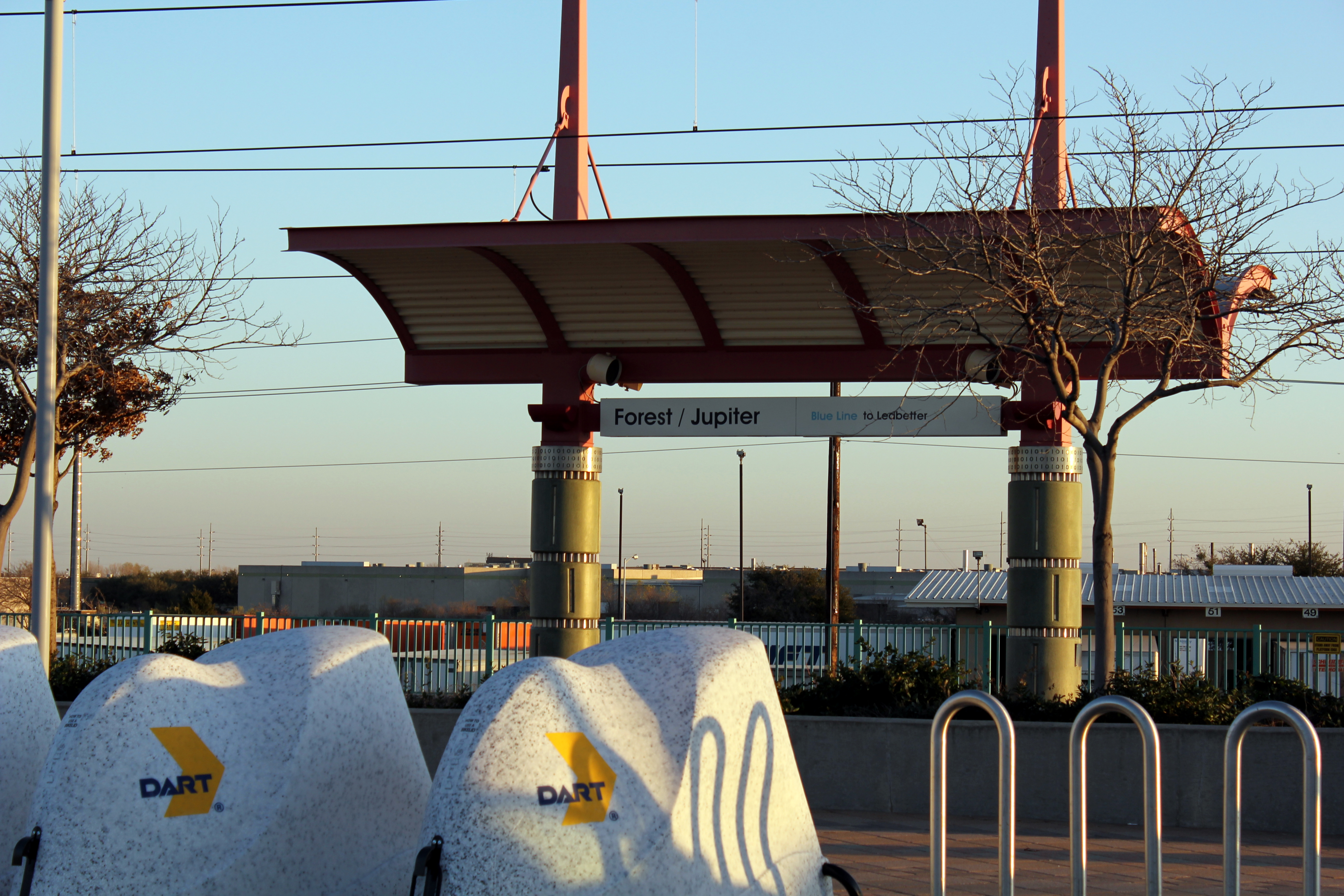

General information
- Location: 3232 Forest Lane; Garland, Texas
- Coordinates: 32°54′29″N 96°40′46″W
- System: DART rail
- Owner: Dallas Area Rapid Transit
- Platforms: 2 side platforms
- Connections: DART: 22, 245, and 247

Construction
- Structure type: At-grade
- Parking: 563 spaces
- Cycle facilities: 4 lockers, 1 rack
- Accessible: Yes

History
- Opened: November 18, 2002

Services
Preceding station	DART	Following station
LBJ/Skillman toward UNT Dallas	Blue Line	Downtown Garland toward Downtown Rowlett
Location

Forest/Jupiter station is a DART rail station in Garland, Texas. The station is located in western Garland at the intersection of Forest Lane and Jupiter Road. It is served by the Blue Line.

The station serves a large industrial corridor (including facilities for Sherwin-Williams and Kraft Heinz) and the Garland Independent School District administration building. A neighborhood 2/3 mile (1.1 km) north of the station contains the Walnut Creek Branch of Garland's Nicholson Memorial Library System.

== History ==
Plans for a station at the Forest/Jupiter intersection date back to DART's first rail plan in 1983. The station would be built on an existing freight corridor constructed by the Missouri–Kansas–Texas Railroad. A more detailed plan of the corridor in 1997 proposed that the station and the crossings over Forest and Jupiter be elevated; ultimately, the station was constructed at-grade, but the crossings remained elevated.

The Blue Line was extended to both Forest/Jupiter and Downtown Garland on November 18, 2002. The station was decorated with stylized plows and gearworks, as well as a 25-foot (7.6 m) wind-activated sculpture, which contains stylized prayer wheels in tribute to the area's Asian population.

On August 15, 2009, the station was temporarily closed due to a chemical spill in an adjacent industrial park.

In 2013, the city of Garland created a tax increment financing district for the area around the station.
