= Blue Line (DART) =

Light rail line in the Dallas-Fort Worth Metroplex, Texas

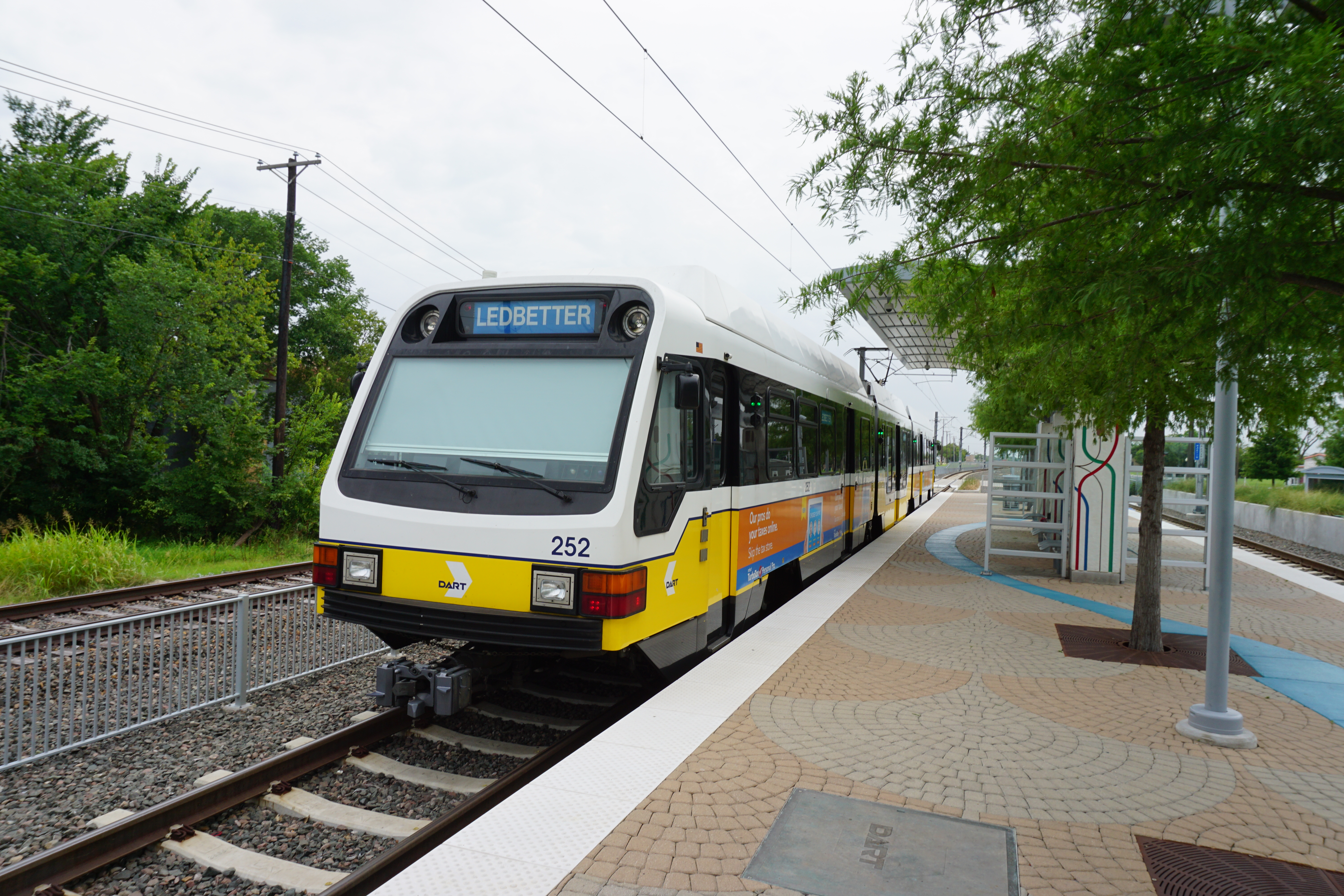
- Blue Line train at Downtown Rowlett

Overview
- Owner: DART
- Locale: Dallas, Texas
- Termini: Downtown Rowlett (north); UNT Dallas (south)
- Stations: 23

Service
- Type: Light rail
- System: DART rail
- Operator(s): DART
- Rolling stock: SLRV

History
- Opened: June 1996

Technical
- Line length: 26.8 mi (43.1 km)
- Track gauge: 4 ft 8 1/2 in (1,435 mm)
- Electrification: Overhead catenary, 750 V DC
- Highest elevation: At grade, elevated, underground
Route map
Blue Line highlighted in blue

The Blue Line is a light rail line in the system of mass transit in Dallas, Texas (USA), operated by the Dallas Area Rapid Transit system. Along with the Red Line, it is one of the original modern rail lines in Dallas.

== Route ==
The southern terminus of the line is currently at UNT Dallas in south Dallas at University Hills Blvd. just south of Camp Wisdom Rd. The line runs north, under the Dallas Convention Center and through downtown Dallas. After leaving Mockingbird, the line diverts to the northeast towards White Rock Lake. The line then goes north and then east into Garland, finally ending in Rowlett.

== History ==
The rail line was part of the initial launch of DART's light rail service in 1996. At the time, the line only ran from Illinois to Pearl in the northeast corner of downtown. In May 1997, the Blue Line was extended south to Ledbetter and was extended along the Red Line to Mockingbird in September 1999, in preparation for the future extension to Garland.

On September 24, 2001, the Blue Line extended to White Rock, just northwest of White Rock Lake. On May 6, 2002, the Blue Line was extended to the LBJ/Skillman, just beyond LBJ Freeway (Interstate 635). It was extended to Downtown Garland on November 18, 2002, and to its current northern terminus, Downtown Rowlett, on December 3, 2012.

DART's 2030 Transit System Plan, approved in October 2006, calls for the Blue Line to be extended south beyond Ledbetter to the University of North Texas at Dallas, as well as a branch along Bonnie View road to Interstate 20 and the SouthPort Intermodal Terminal. The plan also includes a new Lake Highlands station near Skillman Street and Walnut Hill Lane, which opened as DART's second infill station in December 2010.

In October 2014, construction began for a 2.6-mile extension south from Ledbetter station to the University of North Texas at Dallas, adding two new stations to the line: Camp Wisdom and UNT Dallas. The extension opened for service on October 24, 2016.

=== Future plans ===
The D2 Subway was planned to be implemented in 2028 and reroute the Blue Line off of the downtown transit corridor and over the former Green Line's western segment to terminate at North Carrollton/Frankford station. In 2023, DART put D2 plans on an indefinite hold and removed it from DART's 20-year funding plan. This change was due to greatly reduced ridership following the pandemic.

== Stations ==
=== Daily Service ===
Listed from north to south; stations in grey are temporarily closed

Station	Other lines	Opened	Notes
Downtown Rowlett		December 3, 2012	Northern terminus
Downtown Garland		November 18, 2002	
Forest/Jupiter		November 18, 2002	
LBJ/Skillman		November 18, 2002	
Lake Highlands		December 6, 2010	
White Rock		September 24, 2001	
SMU/Mockingbird	Red Line (DART) Orange Line (DART)	January 10, 1997	Northernmost transfer for Red and Orange lines
Cityplace/Uptown	Red Line (DART) Orange Line (DART)	December 18, 2000	Transfer to M-Line Trolley
Pearl/Arts District	Red Line (DART) Green Line (DART) Orange Line (DART)	June 14, 1996	Easternmost transfer for Green Line
St. Paul	Red Line (DART) Green Line (DART) Orange Line (DART)	June 14, 1996	Transfer to M-Line Trolley (one block north)
Akard	Red Line (DART) Green Line (DART) Orange Line (DART)	June 14, 1996	
West End	Red Line (DART) Green Line (DART) Orange Line (DART)	June 14, 1996	Westernmost transfer station for Green and Orange lines
EBJ Union Station	Red Line (DART)	June 14, 1996	Transfer to Dallas Streetcar, Trinity Railway Express, and Amtrak
Convention Center	Red Line (DART)	June 14, 1996	Closed to allow renovations to Kay Bailey Hutchison Convention Center; will reopen in 2029
Cedars	Red Line (DART)	June 14, 1996	
8th & Corinth	Red Line (DART)	June 14, 1996	Southernmost transfer for Red Line
Morrell		June 14, 1996	
Illinois		June 14, 1996	
Kiest		May 31, 1997	
VA Medical Center		May 31, 1997	
Ledbetter		May 31, 1997	
Camp Wisdom		October 24, 2016	
UNT Dallas		October 24, 2016	Southern terminus

=== Special Event Service ===
- Deep Ellum (Also served by Green Line)
- Baylor University Medical Center (Also served by Green Line)
- Fair Park (Also served by Green Line)
- Victory (Also served by Green Line, Orange Line)

=== Deferred ===
- Knox-Henderson Station in Uptown, Dallas
- Plano Road in Lake Highlands, Dallas

== Gallery ==
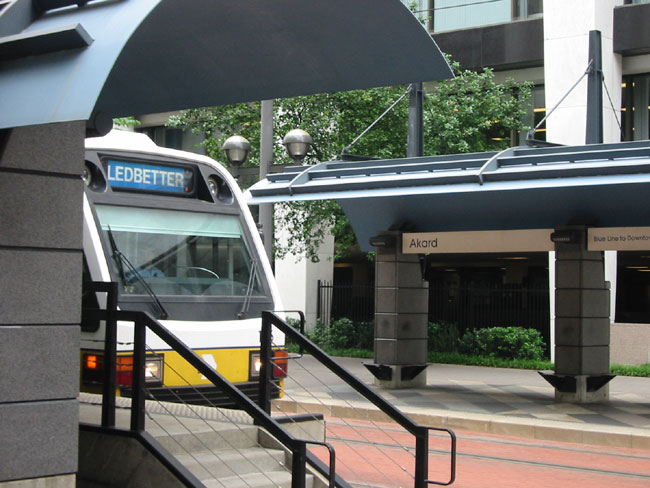
Southbound Blue Line train at Akard

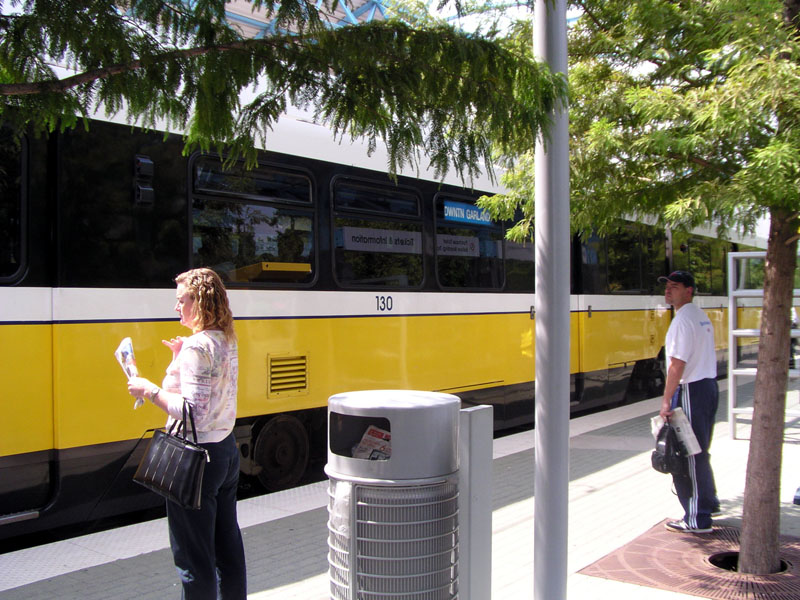
Passengers at White Rock
