= Ledbetter station =

DART rail station in Dallas, Texas

Ledbetter
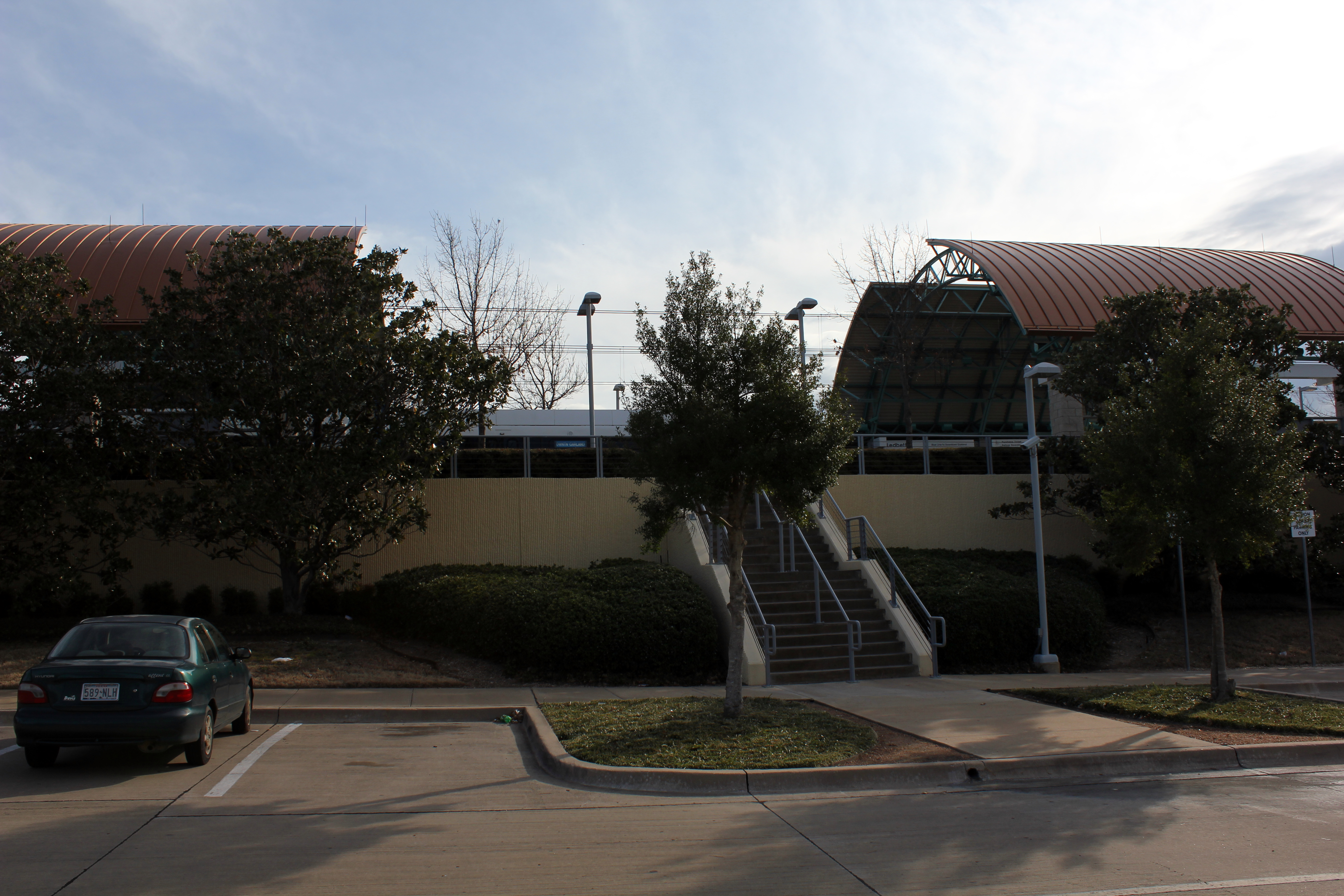

General information
- Location: 2006 East Ledbetter Road; Dallas, Texas 75216
- Coordinates: 32°41′0″N 96°47′19.5″W
- System: DART rail
- Owner: Dallas Area Rapid Transit
- Platforms: Two side platforms
- Connections: DART: 38 217, Inland Port GoLink Zone (M-Sun), Inland Port Connect GoLink Zone (M-F)

Construction
- Parking: 377 free spaces, no overnight
- Cycle facilities: Two lockers, one rack
- Accessible: Yes

History
- Opened: May 31, 1997

Services
Preceding station	DART	Following station
Camp Wisdom toward UNT Dallas	Blue Line	VA Medical Center toward Downtown Rowlett
Location

Ledbetter station is a DART rail station in Dallas, Texas. It is near the Intersection of Lancaster Road (SH 342) and Ledbetter Drive in the Oak Cliff neighborhood. It serves Paul Quinn College. It opened on May 31, 1997, and served as the southern terminus for the Blue Line until an extension to UNT Dallas station opened October 24, 2016.
