= SMU/Mockingbird station =

DART rail station in Dallas, Texas

SMU/Mockingbird
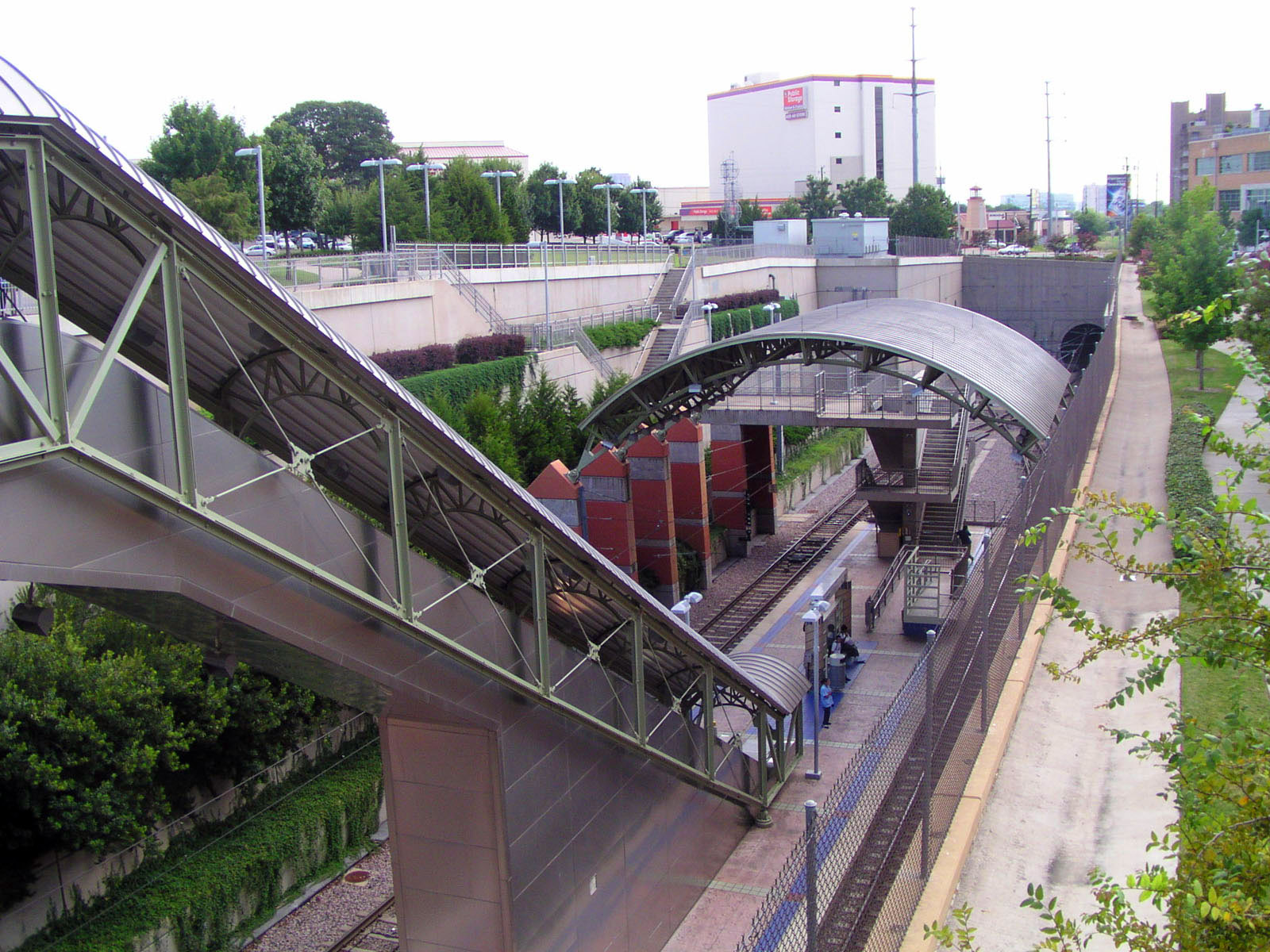
- Station platform viewed from street level

General information
- Location: 5465 East Mockingbird Lane; Dallas, Texas
- Coordinates: 32.837874°N 96.774922°W
- System: DART rail
- Owner: Dallas Area Rapid Transit
- Platforms: Island
- Connections: DART: 3, 17, 205, 249, 440-SMU Express Red (M-Sat), Park Cities GoLink Zone (M-Sun); Highland Park On-Demand; Katy Trail

Construction
- Structure type: Trenched
- Parking: 712 spaces
- Cycle facilities: 8 lockers, 6 racks
- Accessible: Yes

History
- Opened: January 10, 1997
- Former names: Mockingbird

Passengers
- FY 2025: 2,016 (avg. weekday) ▲0.7%

Services
Preceding station	DART	Following station
Cityplace/Uptown toward Westmoreland	Red Line	Lovers Lane toward Parker Road
Cityplace/Uptown toward DFW Airport Terminal A	Orange Line	Lovers Lane toward LBJ/Central or Parker Road
Cityplace/Uptown toward UNT Dallas	Blue Line	White Rock toward Downtown Rowlett
Location

SMU/Mockingbird station (originally Mockingbird station) is a DART rail station in Dallas, Texas. The station is located at the intersection of Mockingbird Lane and North Central Expressway (US 75). The station serves the Red Line, Orange Line, and Blue Line. It is the northernmost station to serve all three lines: the Red and Orange Lines continue north towards Richardson and Plano, while the Blue Line continues northeast towards Garland and Rowlett.

The station is located 1/2 mile (0.80 km) east of the main campus of Southern Methodist University (SMU), which is on Mockingbird Lane on the opposite side of US 75. SMU operates a shuttle route between the station and the campus. The station also serves the University Crossing neighborhood of Dallas and the Park Cities (i.e., Highland Park and University Park). It directly connects to the University Crossing Trail, which in turn connects to the Katy Trail, Ridgewood Trail, and SoPac Trail.

As of the 2025 fiscal year, the station has the highest ridership of all Blue Line stations outside of Downtown Dallas and the highest Saturday ridership of all DART rail stations outside of Downtown Dallas, with an average of 2,016 riders on weekdays, 1,755 riders on Saturdays, and 1,261 riders on Sundays.

Mockingbird Station is a mixed-use development adjacent to the station, which contains an open-air shopping district, an Angelika Film Center, apartments, and office space. Because of this, SMU/Mockingbird has the highest population density within three miles of any mass transit station in Texas.

== Station ==
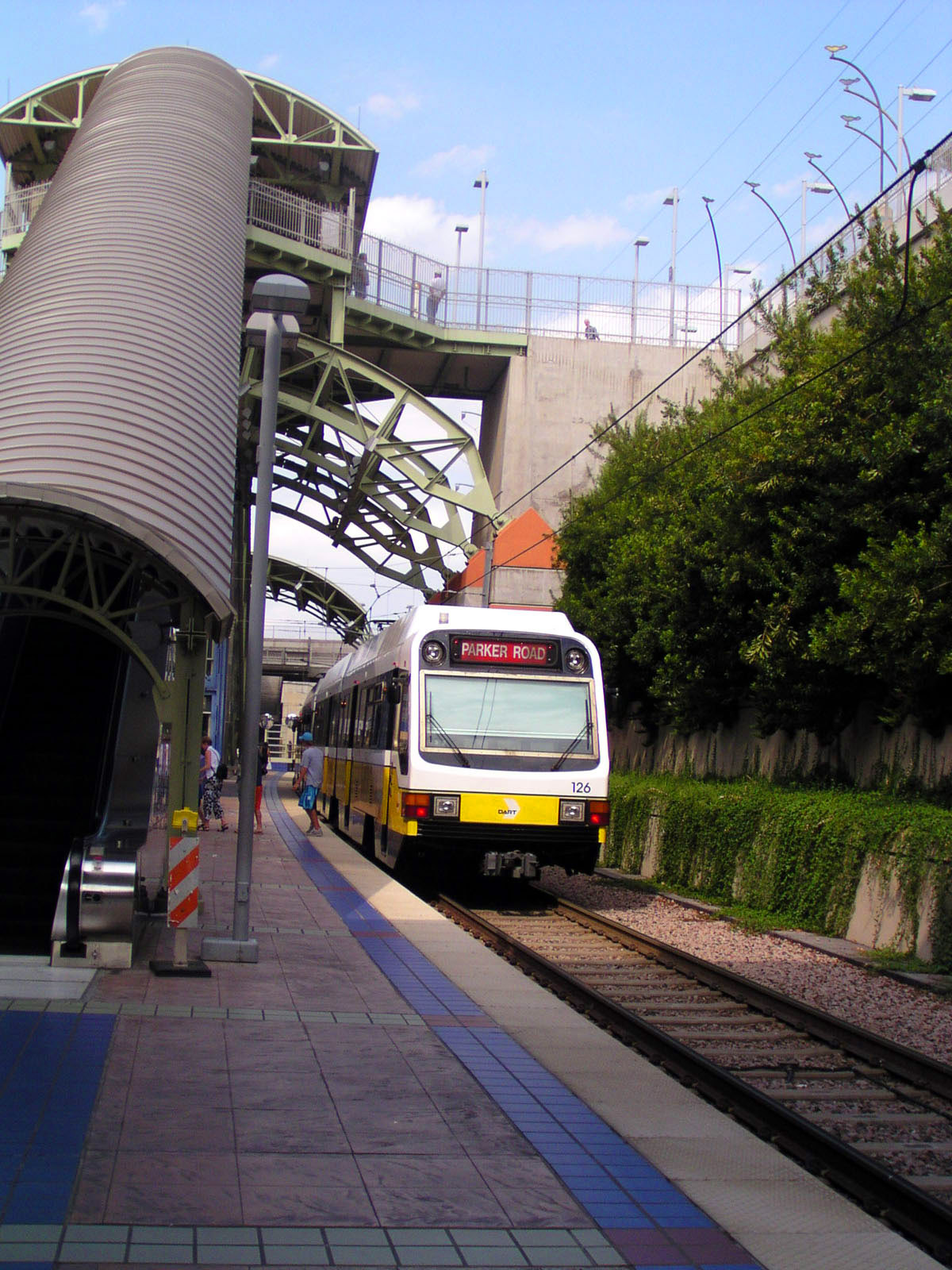
A northbound train at the station

SMU/Mockingbird is one of two entrenched stations in the DART rail system (the other being University of Dallas), with the main platform located 40 feet (12 m) below ground level. The station is the northern end of a 3.5-mile (5.6 km) tunnel to Downtown Dallas.

The station's upper level consists of a small plaza containing ticket machines, an elevator, and a pair of escalators. The west entrance to the plaza leads to the Mockingbird Station development and the University Crossing Trail, while the east entrance leads to buses, passenger drop-off/pick-up, bicycle parking, and vehicle parking. A stairwell to the rail platform is located at each end of the bus platform.

On the lower level is the rail platform, which is an island platform. Southbound and westbound trains board on the western side, while northbound and eastbound trains board on the eastern side. All three lines use the same platforms.

=== Artwork ===
The eastern entrance to the station contains six 20-foot (6.1 m) archways, each of which are decorated with colorful mosaic tiles and topped with a stained-glass mockingbird. The western retaining wall is decorated with a colorful ribbon pattern, while the eastern retaining wall is landscaped with shade-tolerant plants.

== History ==
Plans for a station at North Central and Mockingbird date back to DART's 1983 rail plan. A revised plan in 1986 called for the Mockingbird Lane station to open in 1994 as the initial northern terminus for the North Central line. Later in the decade, DART obtained two rail corridors that intersected north of Mockingbird Lane, one from Southern Pacific (which became the Red Line) and the other from Union Pacific (which became the Blue Line).

A 1990 study of the Southern Pacific corridor determined two possible locations for the Mockingbird Lane station. One location would consist of two separate stations north of the Southern Pacific/Union Pacific junction, while the other would consist of a single station south of the junction. Both proposals included a 950-space parking lot. DART ultimately chose the southern site. The site was located near the former headquarters of Dr Pepper, which was demolished in 1997. A proposal was made to name and theme the station after Dr Pepper, but this was rejected.

Mockingbird station opened on January 10, 1997 as part of a Red Line extension from Pearl to Park Lane. The station did not receive Blue Line service until September 27, 1999, and said service was weekday-only until the opening of White Rock station on September 24, 2001.

In 2015, DART added two dedicated spaces for carsharing company Zipcar to the station's passenger pick-up/drop-off zone. An additional space was added later in the year.

On November 4, 2017, a pedestrian bridge over Mockingbird Lane, which connected the station to the Katy Trail, was opened.

On August 12, 2019, DART renamed the station to SMU/Mockingbird station, with SMU paying DART $463,000 for a 10-year naming rights agreement.

On May 13, 2026, the town of Highland Park exited DART following a successful pullout election. As a replacement for DART, Highland Park announced its own microtransit service, which would connect to SMU/Mockingbird station to allow for transfers to DART rail.

== Development ==
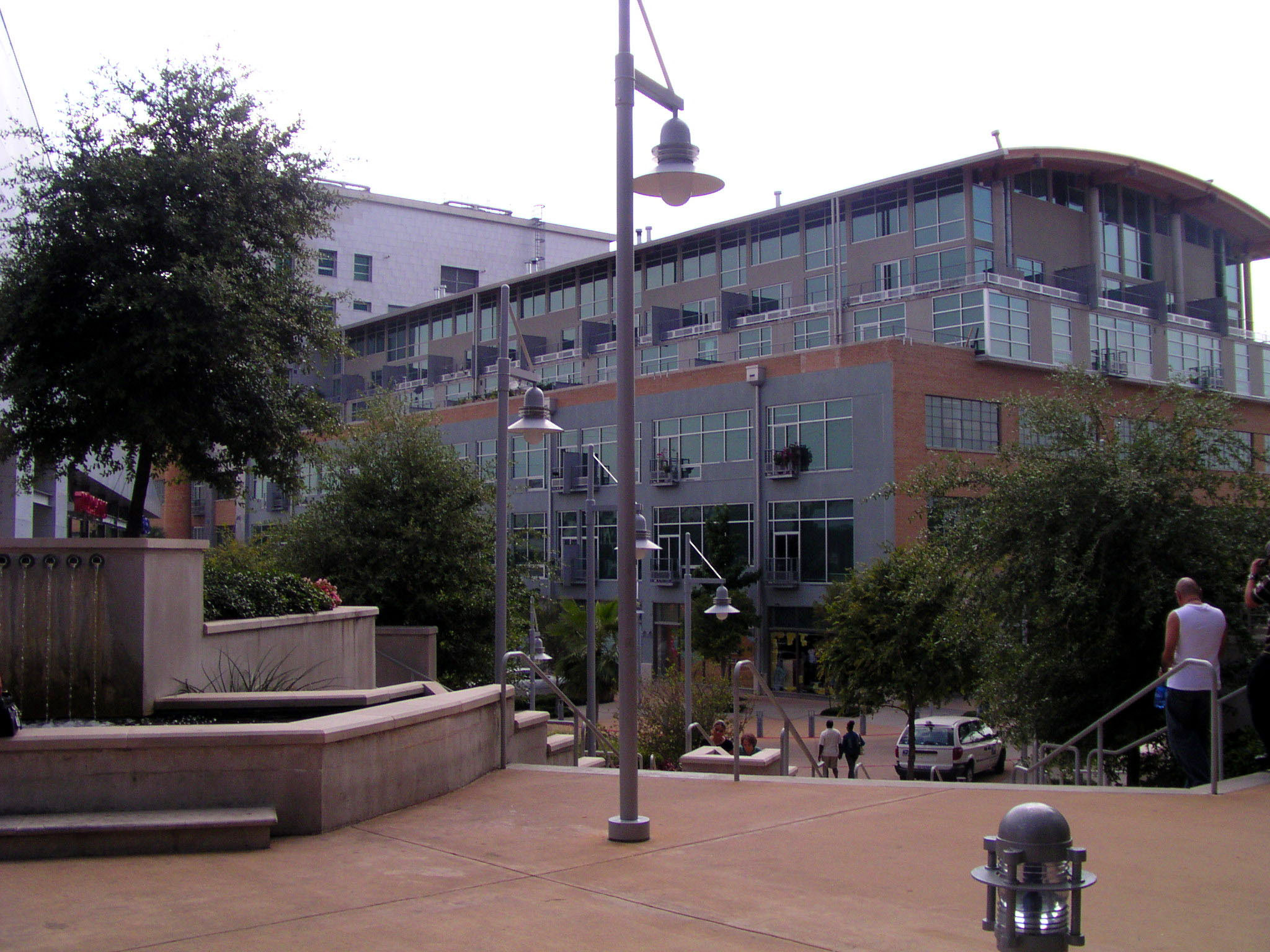
The Lofts at Mockingbird Station, the residential section of the development

Several months after the DART station opened, developers Ken Hughes and Archon Group announced plans for Mockingbird Station, a transit-oriented development complex with a pedestrian connection to the DART station. The 10-acre, $100 million complex, built on top of a former Western Electric warehouse, opened on July 1, 2001.

The complex contains 211 apartments, 150,000 square feet (14,000 m^{2}) of office space, and 200,000 square feet (19,000 m^{2}) of retail and restaurant space. Notable retail tenants include Angelika Film Center, Bath & Body Works, Loft, and Urban Outfitters. The property is currently owned by CBRE Group, which purchased the property in 2015.

A 2004 study of transit-oriented developments by the Transportation Research Board called Mockingbird Station "a TOD success story," praising it for its location with "strong local demographics, and an abundance of adjacent regional attractions," as well as for being driven by private developers.
