= LBJ/Skillman station =

DART rail station in Dallas, Texas

LBJ/Skillman
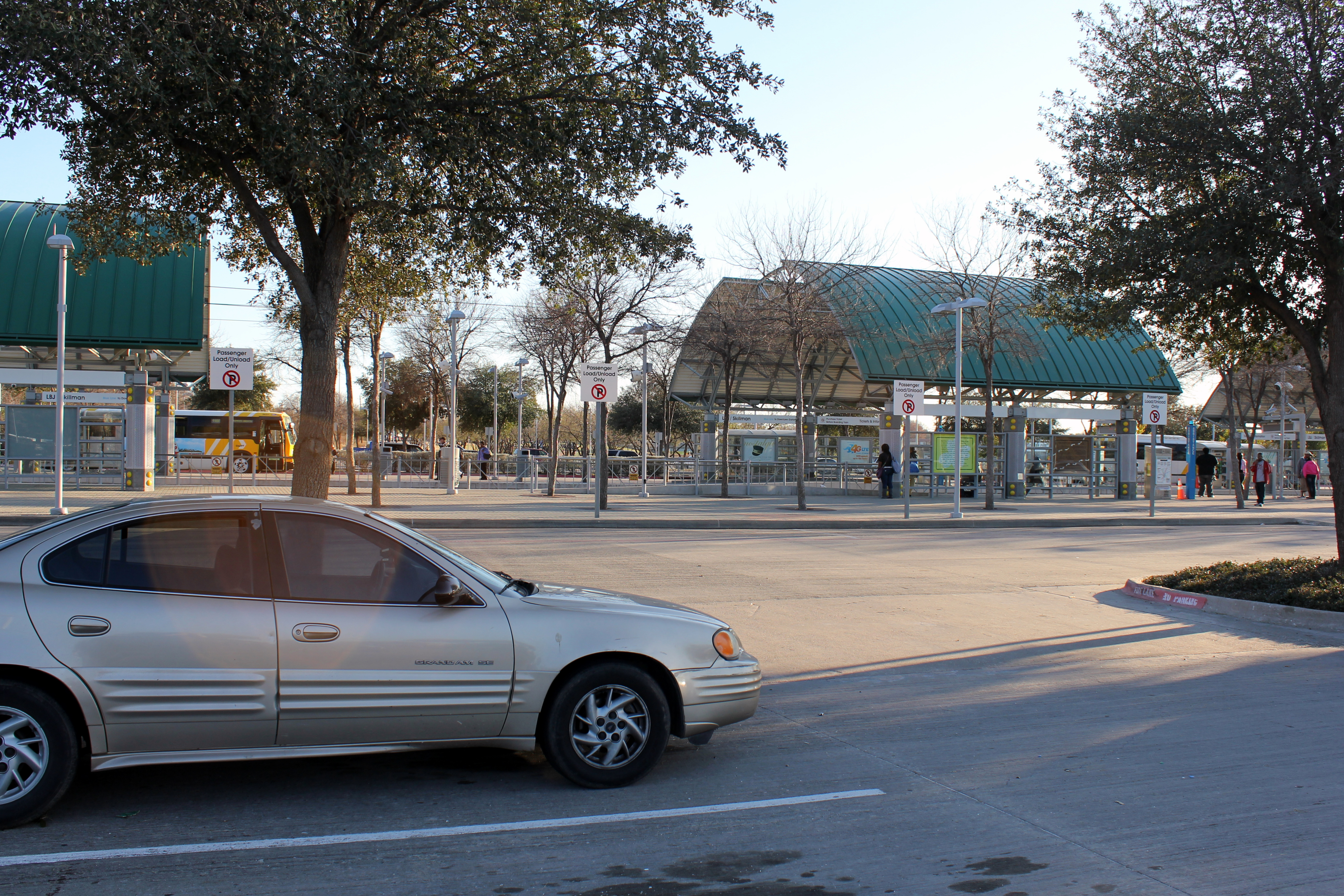

General information
- Location: 10100 Lyndon B. Johnson Freeway; Dallas, Texas
- Coordinates: 32°53′53″N 96°42′42″W
- System: DART rail
- Owner: Dallas Area Rapid Transit
- Platforms: Two side platforms
- Connections: DART: 17, 204, 243

Construction
- Structure type: At-grade
- Parking: 654 spaces
- Cycle facilities: 2 lockers, 1 rack
- Accessible: Yes

History
- Opened: May 6, 2002

Services
Preceding station	DART	Following station
Lake Highlands toward UNT Dallas	Blue Line	Forest/Jupiter toward Downtown Rowlett
Location

LBJ/Skillman station is a DART rail station in Dallas, Texas. It is located on the western frontage road of Lyndon B. Johnson Freeway (I-635), approximately 1/2 mile (0.80 km) southeast of the road's interchange with Skillman Street and Audelia Road. (Note: Skillman Street and Audelia Road temporarily merge while crossing I-635.) The station serves the Blue Line.

The station is a park-and-ride lot. A bus route connects the station to Dallas College Richland Campus.

== Artwork ==
In tribute to both I-635 and Lady Bird Johnson's support of highway beautification, LBJ/Skillman station is decorated with a highway theme. The station's columns feature tire tread patterns containing DART's chevron logo, and the station's paving contains a stylized map of I-635. Windscreens contain quotations from Lyndon B. Johnson and Lady Bird Johnson stylized to resemble highway signage.

A seating area on the northwest corner of the platform is designed to resemble a highway rest area. The surrounding parking lots contain a central median with mile markers counting down to the station platform. The station is landscaped with native plants and wildflowers similar to those used on Texas roadways, which Lady Bird Johnson personally praised.

== History ==
Plans for a station at the intersection of LBJ and Skillman/Audelia, which would be located on an existing Missouri–Kansas–Texas freight corridor, date back to DART's original 1983 rail plan. A 1997 proposal, which called the station LBJ/Audelia, outlined five potential locations: two north of I-635 on its frontage road, two south of I-635 on Audelia Road, and one on the bridge crossing I-635.

The station opened on May 6, 2002. It served as the northern terminus of the Blue Line until the line was extended to Downtown Garland in November.

In 2009, the city of Dallas announced the construction of a 650-foot (200 m) pedestrian bridge over I-635, which would connect the station to Audelia Road south of I-635. The bridge was completed in 2011.
