= DART rail =

Urban rail transit system in the Dallas-Fort Worth Metroplex

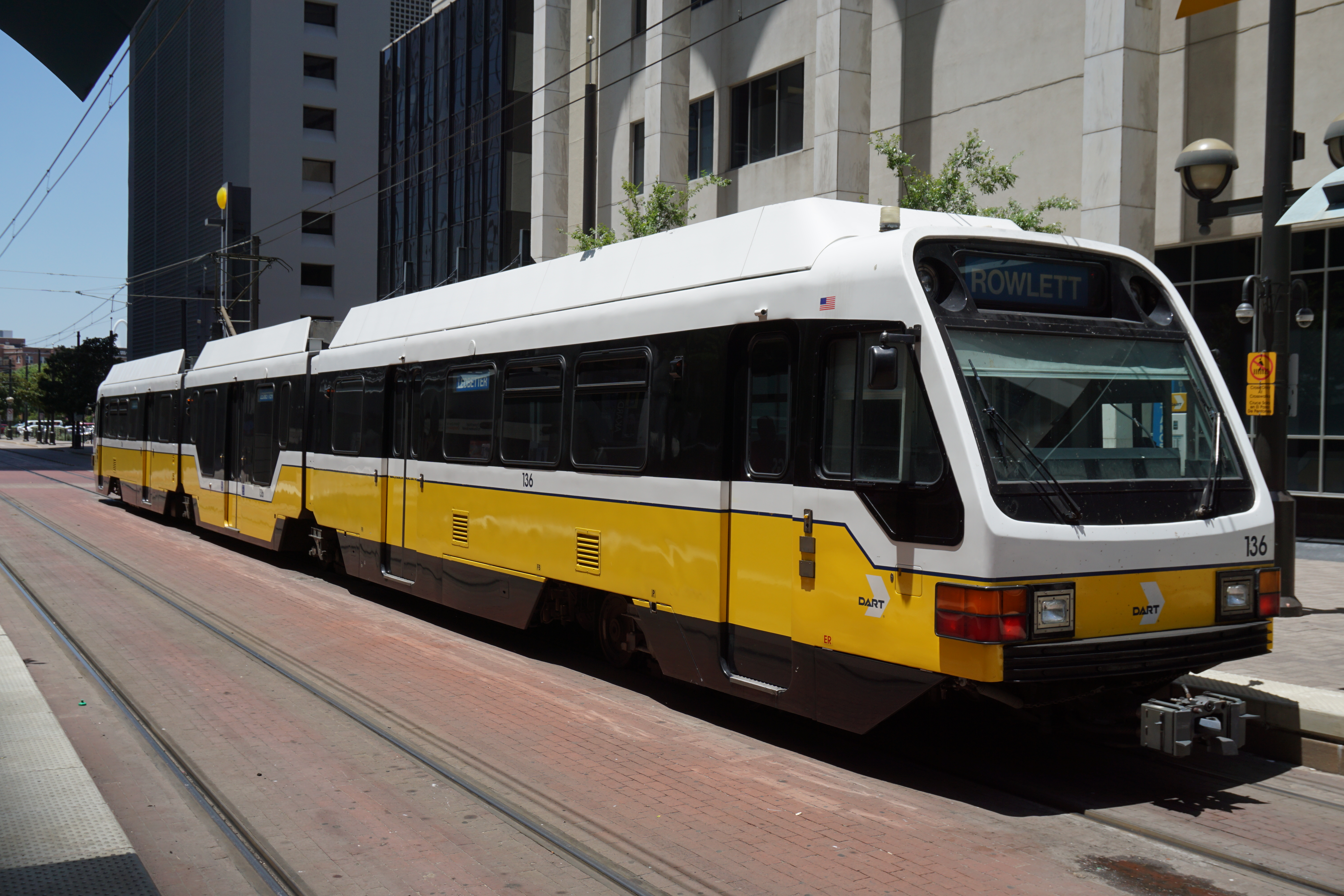
- Light rail train

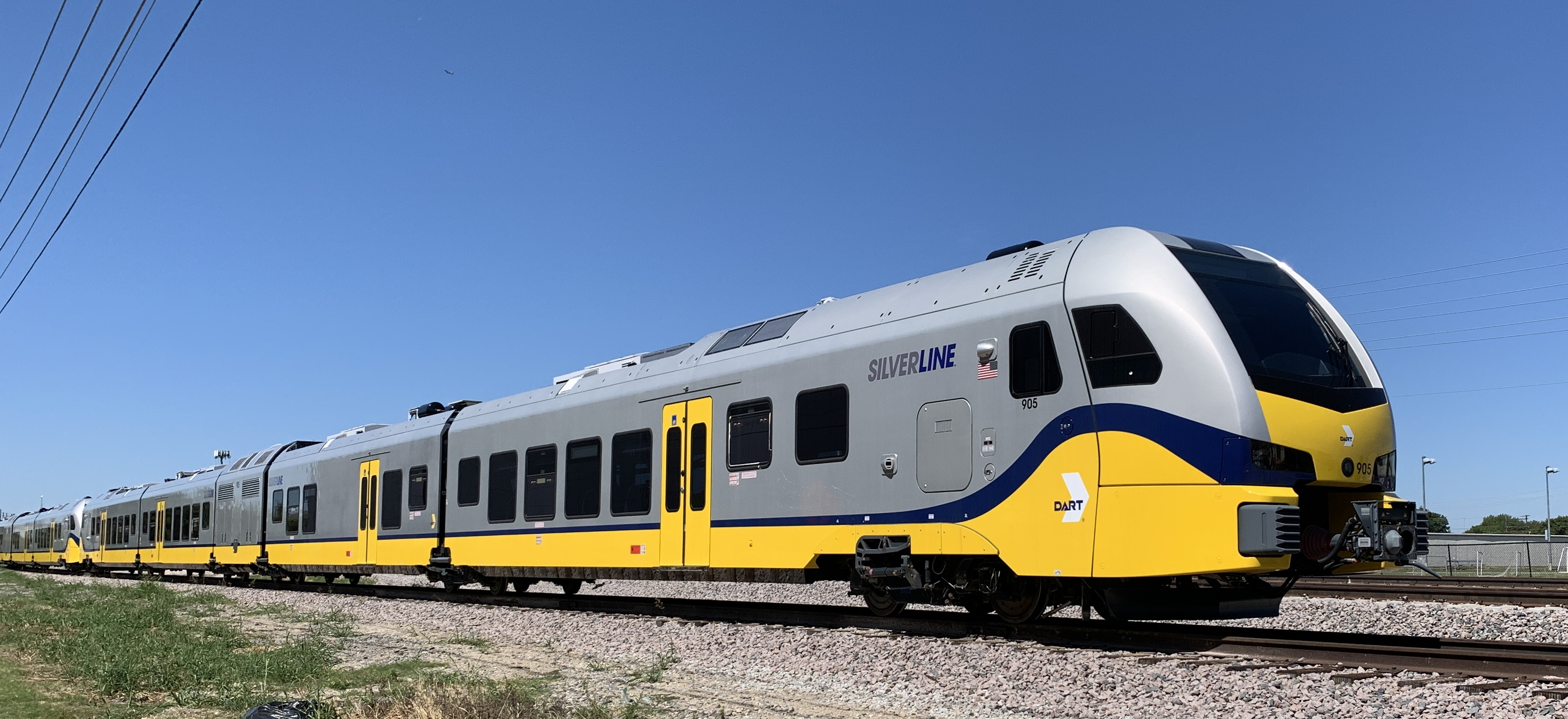
- Hybrid rail train

Overview
- Owner: DART
- Locale: Dallas, Texas
- Transit type: Light rail; Hybrid rail
- Number of lines: 4 light rail lines; 1 hybrid rail line
- Line number: Red Line; Blue Line; Green Line; Orange Line; Silver Line
- Number of stations: 73
- Daily ridership: 65,300 (weekdays, Q2 2026)
- Annual ridership: 21,611,600 (2025)
- Website: dart.org

Operation
- Began operation: June 14, 1996; 30 years ago
- Operator: DART
- Number of vehicles: 163 Kinki Sharyo SLRVs; 8 Stadler FLIRT DMUs
- Headway: Light rail: 20 mins (peak); 20-30 mins (off-peak); Silver Line: 30 mins (peak); 60 mins (off-peak)

Technical
- System length: 119 mi (192 km)
- Track gauge: 4 ft 8 1/2 in (1,435 mm) standard gauge
- Electrification: Overhead line, 750 V DC (light rail)
System map
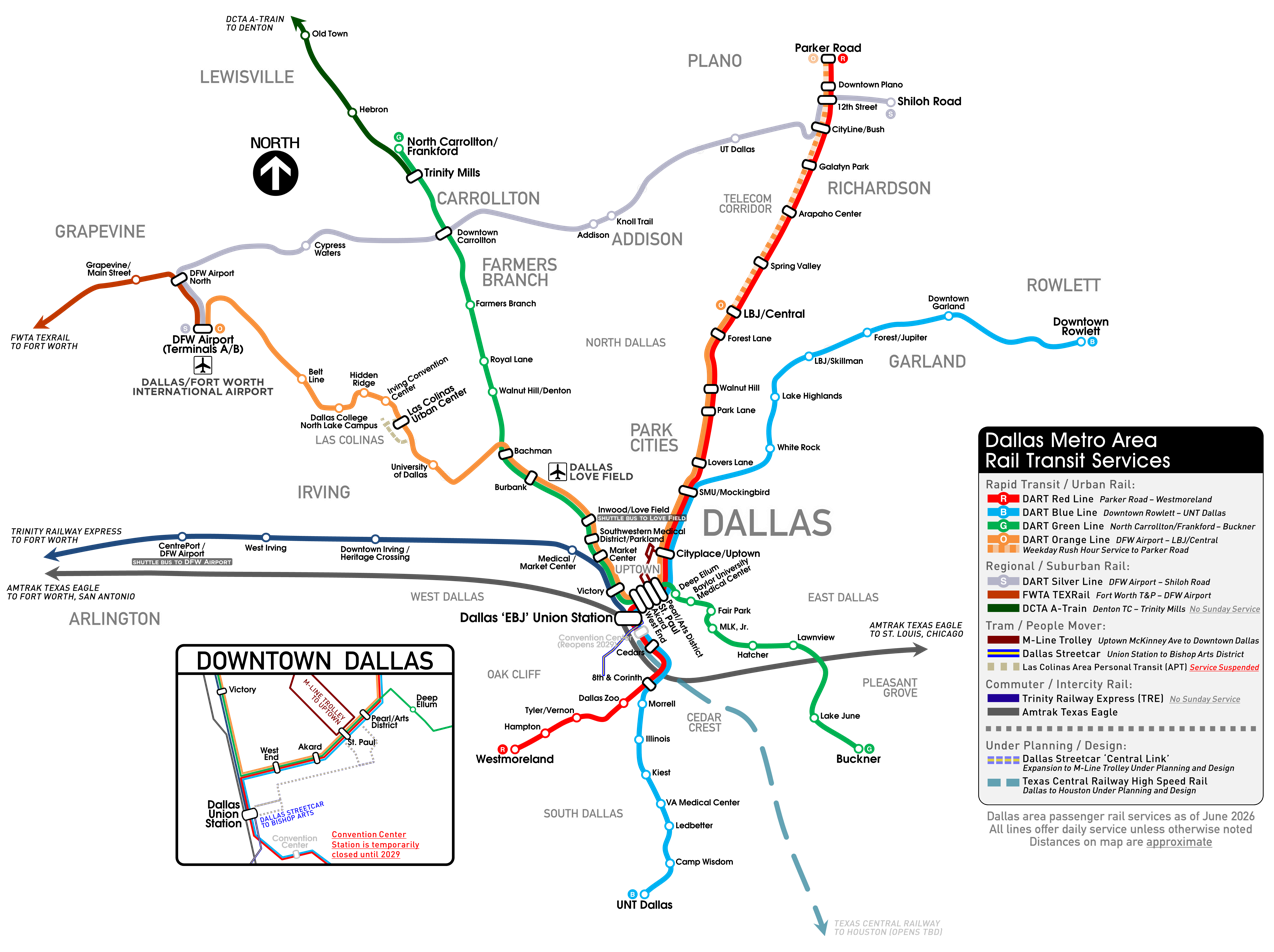
Key

Dallas Area Rapid Transit operates light rail and hybrid rail in the Dallas metropolitan area. The agency's rail system consists of four light rail lines (Red, Blue, Green, and Orange) and one hybrid rail line (Silver), which together span 73 stations across 119 miles (191.5 km) of track.

In 2025, the four light rail lines had a ridership of 21,611,600, or about 65,300 per weekday as of the second quarter of 2026. DART's light rail lines have the 7th highest ridership of light rail systems in the United States. However, the system was also one of the country's worst financial performers.

== History ==
=== Planning ===
In the 1970's, public officials in Dallas became concerned about traffic and air pollution in the area. They proposed light rail as a possible solution to these problems. DART's initial plans called for 160 miles (257.5 km) of commuter rail. The election plan was pared down to 147 miles (236.6 km) when Duncanville, Grand Prairie, and Mesquite opted out of joining the agency. DART chose light rail transit as its primary mode of rail transportation. The plan was pared down again to 93 miles (149.7 km) after a bond vote. After that vote, the agency again pared down the regional rail system to 84 miles (135.2 km).

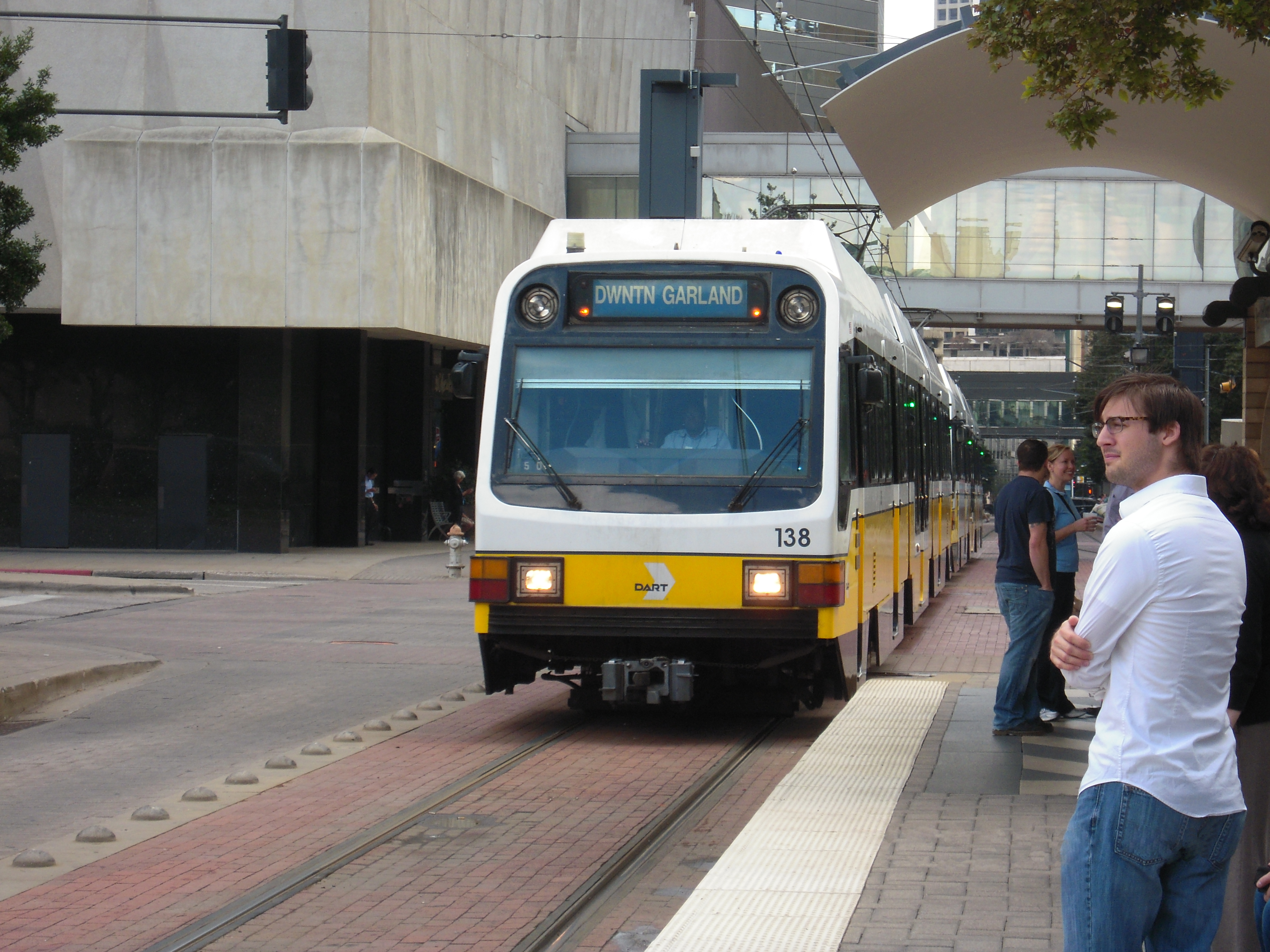
A DART Blue Line train enters Pearl/Arts District station.

=== Starter system ===
After years of scandals involving finances, delays in construction of the rail system, a failed bond election, and nine pull-out votes (two of which were successful), October 1990 was a turning point for the agency, when DART first broke ground on its light rail system. The first sections of track were laid in July 1993. In June 1996, the light rail system began service on time and on budget inaugurating the first light rail system in Texas. Commuter rail service to Irving began in December, after some delays.

To the surprise of critics, Dallasites embraced the new light rail system, with ridership exceeding expectations. The suburbs' confidence in DART was also expressed at the ballot box: four cities held highly publicized pullout elections in 1996 (with the financial assistance of Dallas Cowboys owner Jerry Jones who wanted DART's half-cent sales tax revenue for Texas Stadium in Irving, the Cowboys' home at the time), but all four voted to remain in DART (three of them by margins of more than two-to-one).

The starter system of 20 miles (32 km) opened on June 14, 1996, comprising the Red Line from Westmoreland Road in West Oak Cliff through downtown Dallas to Pearl Street and the Blue Line from Pearl Street to Morrell Station and Illinois Avenue.

The next stage of the starter line opened on January 10, 1997, when DART extended the Red Line from Pearl to Park Lane Station, including the tunnel to Mockingbird Lane, the latter being the site of Dallas's first modern transit village. The northern terminus of the Blue Line remained Pearl Station at that time.

The starter line was completed upon the extension of the Blue Line from Illinois Station to Ledbetter Drive on May 31, 1997, nearly one year after the first part of the starter system opened.

The final change to the starter system came on December 18, 2000, when DART opened Cityplace station, now called Cityplace/Uptown station and the system's first subway station, in the tunnel between Pearl and Mockingbird Lane under North Central Expressway and the Cityplace Tower skyscraper, providing access to the Tower as well as Cityplace West. It was the system's first infill stop.

Commuter rail on the old Rock Island right-of-way began during the series of openings of the light rail starter system. On December 30, 1996, the Trinity Railway Express opened its first segment, as the South Irving Transit Center was connected to Union Station in downtown Dallas with a stop in the middle at Medical/Market Center Station, near the University of Texas Southwestern Medical Center system. At the time, the agency leased rail cars due to a delay in the current stock until the following March.

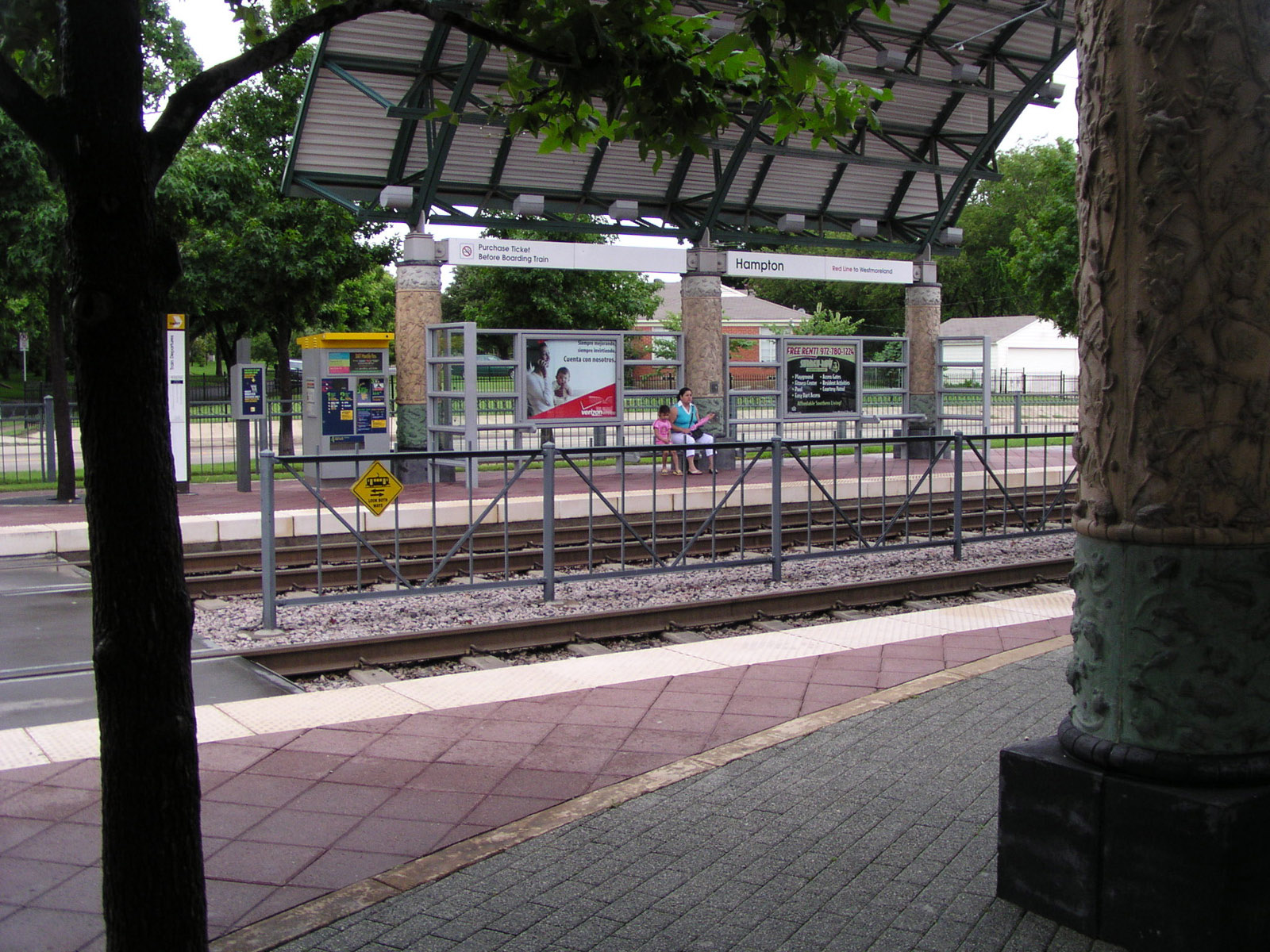
Passengers waiting at the Hampton Station.

=== Suburban expansion ===
After the success of the light rail starter system, voters approved DART's request to use long-term bonds to expedite the construction of the regional light rail system. While DART had originally planned single-track extensions of the Blue Line to Garland and the Red Line to Richardson and Plano, the starter system was so popular that the agency made plans to double-track the entire route.

Work began on the extensions of both the Blue Line and the Red Line on January 15, 1999. On September 27, DART extended the Blue Line to Mockingbird ahead of its eventual expansion to Garland. The first station to open in the 3rd millennium came on September 24, 2001, when the Blue Line was extended from Mockingbird to White Rock station. Later, the Blue Line was further extended east outside the LBJ Loop when LBJ/Skillman station opened on May 6, 2002.

The first extension of the Red Line opened on July 1, 2002, when the line was extended seven stations north from a newly rebuilt Park Lane station to Galatyn Park station. Richardson became the first Dallas suburb to be served by light rail.

The Blue Line was completed to Garland on November 18, 2002, making it the second suburb to get light rail service. Two stations, at Jupiter Road and in Downtown Garland, opened to the public.

The final stage of north-central and northeast "suburban" light rail expansion opened six months ahead of schedule, when the Red Line extension to Downtown Plano and Parker Road opened on December 9, 2002, providing light rail service to Plano for the first time and completing the current configuration of the Red Line.

=== 2030 Plan ===
In October 2006, the DART Board of Directors unanimously approved a long-term "2030 Plan", which included the following proposals for its next round of rail expansion:

- A 2.9-mile (4.7 km) light rail extension of the Blue Line to Bonnie View Road and Interstate 20 to a new SouthPort intermodal port in southeast Dallas.
- A 4.3-mile (6.9 km) light rail extension of the Red Line south to Red Bird Lane.
- A 4.3-mile (6.9 km) light rail extension of the Orange Line along Scyene Road to approximately Masters Drive. The line would branch off the Green Line east of Lawnview Avenue.
- A 6-mile (10 km) light rail line in West Dallas along Fort Worth Avenue or Singleton to Loop 12/Jefferson Boulevard. No color designation was given for this planned line.
- A station for the Lake Highlands neighborhood of northeast Dallas on the Blue Line, between White Rock Station and LBJ/Skillman Station. This area previously opposed rail service, so the tracks were built through the area without a station. Lake Highlands opened on December 6, 2010, becoming the first component of the 2030 plan to be completed and the first infill station in DART's system. This is a key component of the new Lake Highlands Town Center TOD development.
- A nearly 26-mile (42 km) Silver Line commuter service in the east-west Cotton Belt corridor from the Red Line in Plano to DFW International Airport. This line would provide rail service to the bus transfer station in Addison and would intersect the Green Line at Downtown Carrollton Station.

The final 2030 plan included several changes from the draft plan released in July 2006. Removed from the final plan was a 6.3-mile (10.1 km) branch of the Red Line from Forest Lane Station to the Addison Transit Center, which would have included several miles of subway under Interstate 635. DART officials cited the line's high cost, US$700 million, and lack of strong support from the city of Dallas. The Blue Line extension to the Dallas Southport Center (intermodal terminal) was added after strong pressure from Dallas officials. Also, the proposed light rail line serving West Dallas was not originally considered as a priority for rail service.

The Cotton Belt corridor plans continued to generate controversy right up to the day of the vote on the 2030 plan. DART leaned toward diesel powered commuter rail for the Cotton Belt corridor, similar to the Trinity Railway Express. However, the line would pass through affluent Far North Dallas neighborhoods, which formed the Cotton Belt Concerned Coalition to fight the line in 1990. The group lobbied for electric light rail vehicles on the line to avoid perceived air and noise pollution associated with diesel rail, and also proposed that the line be placed in a below-ground trench. These proposals were accepted by the City of Dallas in June 2006 in a unanimous resolution. DART, however, balked at the cost of trenching the line, which they estimated at $250 million. This set up a confrontation between DART and the city of Dallas, which appoints eight of the board's 15 members. The final plan compromised by promising $50 million "to help address neighborhood concerns".

The current Cotton Belt freight corridor runs just south of the Downtown Plano station on the Red Line, but DART maps of the 2030 plan indicated that the commuter rail line would run to the nearby Bush Turnpike station, the nearest station to the south of downtown Plano. The Cotton Belt line would run through former DART member city Coppell between Carrollton and DFW Airport; although no station locations are included in the plan, the promise of a future station could entice Coppell, which withdrew from DART in 1989, into rejoining the agency.

In 2010, citing deficits and drops in revenue, DART scrapped much of their 2030 plan.

=== Green and Orange Line expansion ===
On July 3, 2006, the Federal Transit Administration (FTA) approved a US$700 million Full Funding Grant Agreement (FFGA) — the largest grant ever awarded to DART — to kick-start a US$2.5 billion expansion of the light rail system. This phase included two new light rail lines that doubled DART's light rail mileage. Construction began in September 2006. Upon completion of the project in 2013, the size of DART's light rail system doubled to 90 miles (145 km).

In maps before 2006, DART labeled the Pleasant Grove to Carrollton route the "Orange Line", and the Irving route was the "Purple Line". Green was generally used on DART maps to denote the route of the Trinity Railway Express. By the time construction started, DART was using the new Green Line designation as part of its marketing efforts, saying "Like the color green, this line is a symbol of our city on the move."

The Green Line began operation on September 14, 2009, with a route from downtown Dallas southeast to Fair Park; this short route was scheduled to open in time to service the 2009 State Fair of Texas. On December 6, 2010, the line extended further at both ends – to Pleasant Grove, as well as continuing northwest from Victory Station to Farmers Branch and Carrollton; both extensions, completing the Green Line.

The Green Line's northern end connects with the A-train line run by the Denton County Transportation Authority (DCTA). This line connects Denton to Carrollton, with stops in Lewisville and Highland Village. The commuter train may stop in other Denton County cities, should they choose to join the DCTA.

The second line, the Orange Line originates at LBJ/Central on the Red Line and runs concurrently with the Red Line to downtown, then with the Green Line to northwest of Love Field Airport at Bachman Lake, where it branches off toward Irving, then continuing to DFW International Airport. DART is cooperating with Love Field to link that airport to the Orange Line, but service is currently connected by a bus shuttle. The line runs through Las Colinas and connects to the Las Colinas APT System. DART had preliminary plans for the Orange Line to run concurrently with the Red Line from downtown Dallas to LBJ/Central Station. The line ends at LBJ/Central Station with rush hour service to Parker Road Station. The first Orange Line stations opened on July 30, 2012, while service to Belt Line Station in Irving began on December 3, 2012. An extension of the Orange Line from Belt Line Station to DFW Airport Station opened on August 18, 2014.

=== Downtown Dallas (D2) Transit Study ===
In 2007, DART recognized that with Blue and Red Line trains sharing tracks through the Dallas Central Business District corridor, and the Orange and Green Lines also using this trunk segment through downtown, a single alignment would not have the capacity to support all four rail lines. Under a 1990 agreement with the City of Dallas, DART agreed to build a second rail alignment through downtown once certain operating or ridership figures were met, and DART projected that it would hit these targets by the early 2010s. As a result, DART commissioned its Downtown Dallas Transit Study, known as the D2 Study, to study the possibility of building a second rail alignment through downtown.

In spring 2008, DART announced it had considered 16 possible plans for a second rail alignment, and selected four for more detailed consideration. All four proposals provided for an alignment between Victory Station and Deep Ellum Station, indicating the D2 alignment would be used for Green and Orange Line service while the Red and Blue Lines would continue to use the existing alignment. However, on April 27, 2010, DART announced financial problems would prevent it from funding construction of the D2 alignment, putting the plan in limbo.

After a three-year hiatus, DART announced on February 6, 2013 that it would begin holding public hearings on "Phase II" of the D2 study, to discuss alternatives and refinements to its D2 options since it ended "Phase I" of the D2 study in 2010. At a public hearing on February 13, 2013, DART announced it was expanding to consider eight possible D2 alignments, some of which would connect to Union Station instead of Victory Station and thus provide Red and Blue Line service. While the D2 Study is being funded by a $700,000 grant, the $500 million to $1 billion alignment is unfunded, and construction is not expected to begin before 2025.

In August 2015, the Dallas City Council voted to only recommend an alignment above-ground along Jackson Street, over the objections of DART officials, who requested the addition of a Young Street route as a fallback. The alignment along Young Street was opposed by the First Presbyterian Church of Dallas, as the light rail would run through its property. However, the church and local residents, along with structural issues (the local library would have to be demolished, and many historic buildings would be close to or within the path of the line), helped to form an opposition to the new Jackson locally preferred alternative (LPA). Due to this, the City of Dallas voted against the Jackson alignment and instead for the alignment to be in a subway for the majority of its time in downtown. This led DART to have to reconsider the alignment, and also balance funding for the Silver Line, which created tension between supporters of both rail lines, who believed that only one of the two could be built. However, DART eventually voted in favor of eventually funding the Cotton Belt and D2.

DART is considering three alignments, all of which are underground for a majority of their routes. A decision was intended to be made by 2018 as to which route will be pitched to the FTA, although city leaders in 2017 had endorsed the Commerce subway route (along with a downtown streetcar design) to move forward into consideration. A preferred alignment was chosen by DART and the city of Dallas in 2022; all stakeholders in the project agreed on this preferred alternative for the first time in the project's history.

The D2 subway project was quietly removed from DART's long-term financial plan in July 2023. DART will instead use debt capacity intended for the D2 subway to improve the current system, including new trains, signal upgrades, and reliability and cleanliness improvements. The agency intends to explore alternatives to increase capacity in downtown Dallas and methods to increase ridership across the system.

=== Platform extensions ===
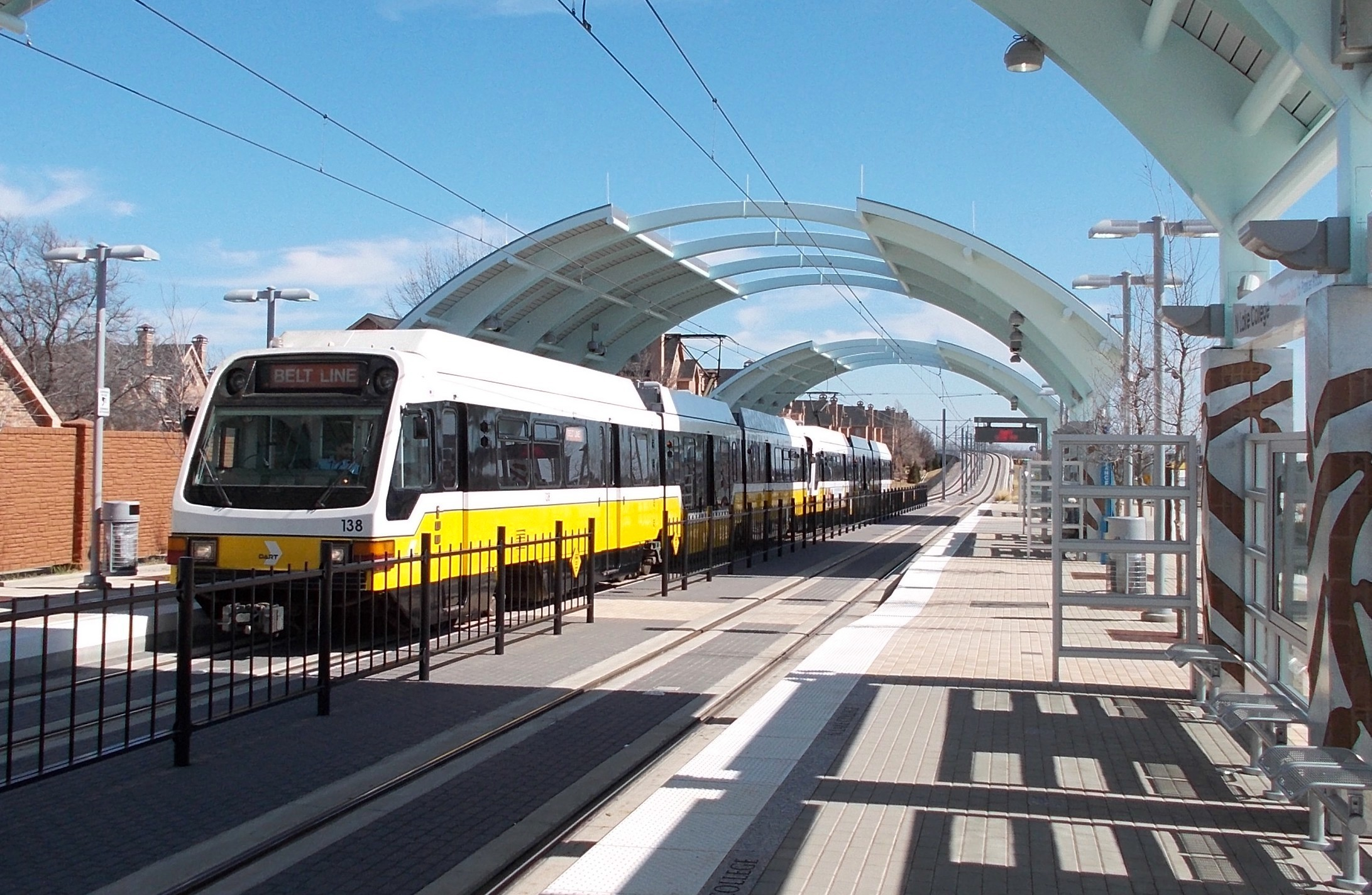
A two-car SLRV on the existing long platform at NL College on the Orange Line (the pantographs are each over the low floor sections of the train)

To allow for more capacity, the "platform extensions" will be completed before tunneling on the D2 corridor starts. This project allows for three-car trains during rush hour. There are 28 stations on the red and blue line that will be rebuilt at an estimated cost of $129 million. The planning for the platform extensions started in 2014 and the construction was approved in 2017. Regular operation of three-car trains is expected for 2022. In March 2018 the contract was awarded to Lockwood, Andrews & Newnam (LAN). Construction started in July 2019 to be finished in August 2022. As of 2026, three-car trains do not operate regularly outside of events and the State Fair of Texas due to reduced amount of reliably operating SLRVs in the fleet.

Apart from capacity the project allows for barrier-free access to trains even on the oldest lines of the network. The platforms will be raised to the 15.5 inches (40 cm) floor height of the low-floor middle section of the SLRV trains. This concept allows to get half of the funding from the Teax Mobility Funds. Almost another half of the funding comes from federal resources leaving mostly the planning costs to DART, which is below ten million.

The project has accordingly two phases. In the first phase the platforms are raised by 7.5 inches (20 cm) on their existing length. In the second phase the platforms are extended from their original 300 feet (91 m) to accommodate long trains. A common street-level station will have side platforms of 450 feet (140 m) length with a raised boarding area of 385 feet (117 m). At each end crossings and ramps are built.

The Green and Orange lines had been constructed to that standard from the beginning, however they could not use that length in regular operation. The platform extensions were part of the initial planning of system with reserved space on each station since the 1980s. However, this concept was expecting a possibility of four-car trains with the LRV type vehicles of the time. The newer SLRV have that length with three-car trains already. The raised and underground stations had been constructed at 400 feet (120 m) from the beginning but it is a higher effort to rebuild them to a raised platform in the first phase due to existing stairs.

=== Silver Line construction ===
Construction commenced on the Silver Line in 2019 after DART secured a $908 million Railroad Rehabilitation and Improvement Financing federal loan from November 2018 to pay for most of the line's projected $1.1 billion cost. To cover the remainder, DART asked some cities to pick up a share of the tab to help pay for the costs of stations in places where the line diverts from the freight track's path. The line opened for service on October 25, 2025.

== Current lines ==
=== Red Line ===
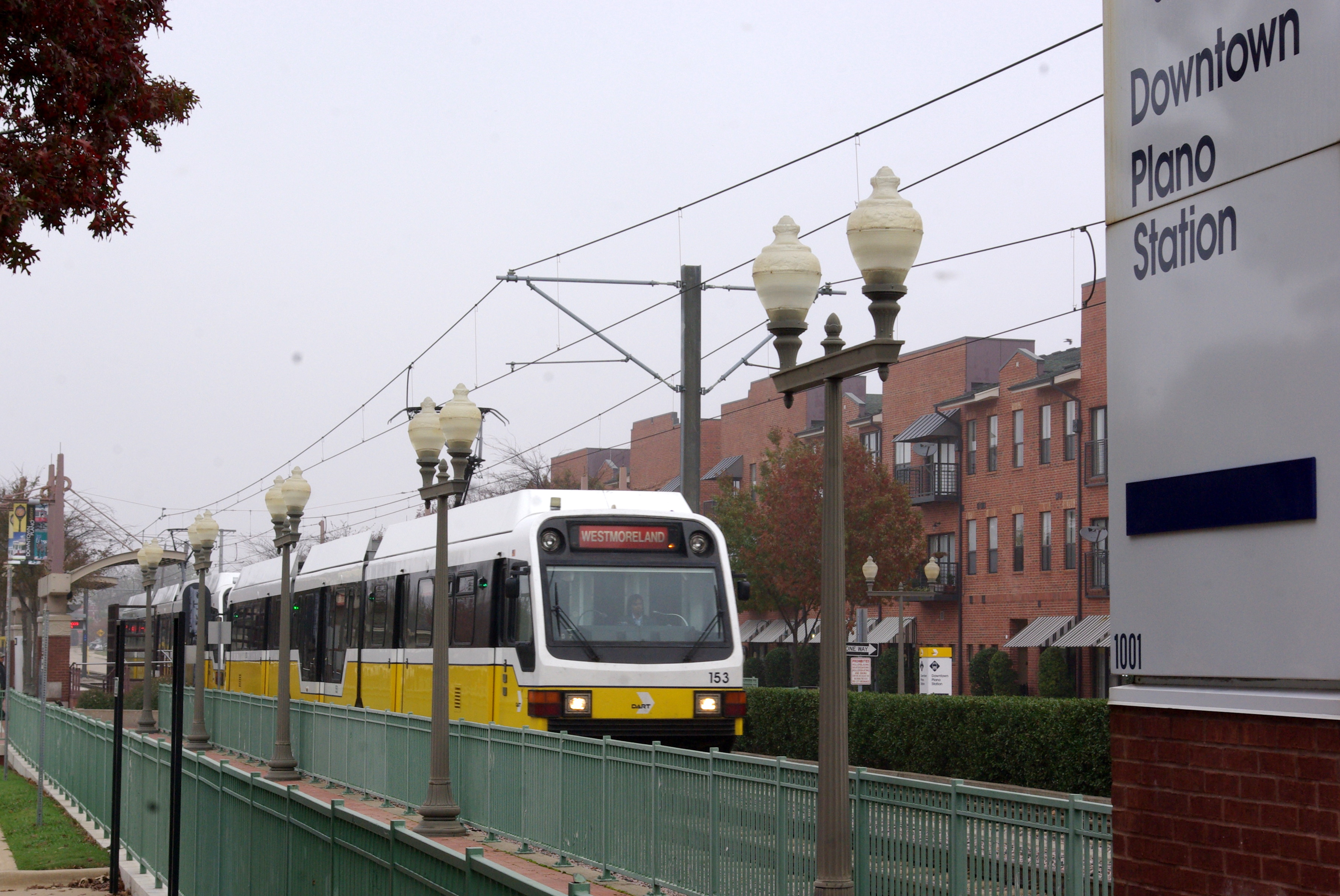
Red Line train leaving Downtown Plano station in Plano

The Red Line runs from southwest to northeast, from Westmoreland Station, in southwest Dallas, to Parker Road Station in Plano. Heading north from Westmoreland, the line provides service to Dallas Convention Center, Union Station, and the Dallas Central Business District, then follows Central Expressway (US 75) through North Dallas, Richardson and Plano.

=== Blue Line ===
The Blue Line runs from southwest to northeast, UNT Dallas, in southwest Dallas, to Downtown Rowlett Station in Rowlett. Heading north from UNT Dallas, the line provides service to Dallas Convention Center, Union Station, and the Dallas Central Business District, then turns northeast, providing service to White Rock Lake, Garland, and Rowlett.

=== Green Line ===
The Green Line runs from Buckner Station, near Loop 12 in southeast Dallas, to North Carrollton/Frankford Station in Carrollton in the northwest. Heading north from Buckner, the line serves Fair Park, Deep Ellum, and the Dallas Central Business District, then turns northwest along the Interstate 35E (Texas) corridor, serving the American Airlines Center, Parkland Hospital, Love Field, Farmers Branch, and Carrollton, where a transfer is available to the A-train line run by the Denton County Transportation Authority (DCTA).

=== Orange Line ===
The Orange Line runs between Parker Road station in Plano and Dallas/Fort Worth International Airport. The Orange Line duplicates the Red Line along the Central Expressway (US 75) corridor from Parker Road to the Dallas Central Business District, then follows the Green Line along the Interstate 35E (Texas) corridor, serving the American Airlines Center, Parkland Hospital, and Love Field, before branching west along the Highway 114 corridor to Irving. The final leg of the Orange Line from Belt Line to DFW Airport opened on August 18, 2014.

Silver Line train arriving at the Cityline/Bush station in Richardson, Texas

=== Silver Line ===
The Silver Line runs east–west between DFW Airport Terminal B station and Shiloh Road station in Plano. The Silver Line follows a former rail right of way previous owned by the St. Louis Southwestern Railway, commonly known as the Cotton Belt, a subsidiary of the Southern Pacific Railroad. The line runs through the North Dallas region, serving the cities of Grapevine, Carrollton, Addison, Richardson, and Plano along its route through Tarrant, Dallas, and Collin counties. The line serves Dallas Fort Worth International Airport, Addison Airport, Prestonwood Town Center, and the University of Texas at Dallas

== Rolling stock ==
=== Light rail ===
Upon opening in 1996, DART's light rail utilized Kinki Sharyo LRV vehicles, which were articulated, bi-directional, two-section cars. Between 2007 and 2010, DART converted these vehicles into SLRVs, which added a central section with level boarding (dubbed the "C-car") to increase capacity and improve accessibility. DART is the only transit agency that utilizes the SLRV.

DART's current fleet of SLRVs contains 163 vehicles, each of which have a seating capacity of 94 passengers and a crush capacity of 274. Up to three vehicles can be coupled together. The SLRV fleet is maintained from two facilities: the Central Rail Operating Facility in The Cedars and the smaller Northwest Rail Operating Facility near Bachman Lake.

Due to the age of its SLRV fleet, in 2025, DART announced plans to procure new light rail vehicles as part of its DART Transform initiative. The new vehicles are expected to enter service in 2029.

=== Hybrid rail ===
The Silver Line utilizes Stadler FLIRT diesel multiple unit (DMU) trainsets, which were ordered in June 2019. The fleet consists of 8 vehicles, each of which have a seating capacity of 222 passengers and a crush capacity of 457.

The FLIRT vehicles will be maintained from a dedicated facility in Plano between the 12th Street and Shiloh Road stations, which is currently being constructed.

== Operation ==
The light rail lines operate seven days a week from 4:30 a.m. to 12:30 a.m., On each individual line, service operates Monday through Friday every 15 minutes during commute periods and every 20 minutes middays and early evening, while operating every 30 minutes after approximately 10 p.m. On Saturday and Sunday, service operates every 20 minutes between 9 a.m. and 8 p.m., and every 30 minutes early morning and at night. Portions of the system have headways cut in half where at least two lines share rail tracks, with all four lines which converge in downtown Dallas along the Pacific Avenue/Bryan Street corridor commanding headways of 3.5 minutes at the most to 5–7 minutes at the least.

The Silver Line operates seven days a week. On weekdays, trains run from 4 am to 1 am, with 30-minute headways during peak periods (5–9 am and 3–7 pm) and hourly service during all other times. On weekends and major holidays, trains operate hourly in both directions between 5 am and 1 am.

== Accidents and incidents ==
- On June 3, 1997, a front-end loader ran a red light into the path of a train in Oak Cliff. The loader driver and 19 of the train's 20 passengers were injured, and the lead car was derailed. The incident was investigated by the National Transportation Safety Board.
- On March 1, 2014, a car driver died in a collision near Fair Park. A DART representative claimed the car driver had ignored the intersection's crossing signals.
- On May 15, 2014, six passengers and a train driver were injured in a collision with a trailer truck in Farmer's Branch.
- On June 30, 2014, a passenger died when he attempted to board a departing northbound train at Bachman station and fell under the train.
- On December 29, 2014, a car collided with a southbound train after driving through a crossing arm near LBJ/Central station. Three passengers were injured, and the train was derailed.
- On December 19, 2020, two passengers were injured when a northbound train derailed in Downtown Dallas and collided with a southbound train.
- On October 16, 2021, a person died after being hit by a southbound train near Farmers Branch station.
- On October 5, 2023, a southbound train derailed at Galatyn Park station due to a mechanical failure. No injuries were reported, but the station's catenary wires were damaged.
- On July 23, 2024, four firefighters were injured after a Dallas Fire Rescue truck drove off Interstate 345 in Downtown Dallas and fell onto the light rail tracks. The incident caused a power outage in DART's downtown corridor due to catenary damage.
- On July 30, 2025, a northbound train caught fire while entering a tunnel in Downtown Dallas, injuring 15 passengers and passerby. Following the fire, DART closed the downtown corridor for six days. A preliminary report by the National Transportation Safety Board stated that the fire occurred due to an arcing catenary wire.

== See also ==
- List of DART rail stations
- Dallas Streetcar
- M-Line Trolley
- Light rail in the United States
- List of United States light rail systems by ridership
- List of tram and light rail transit systems
- Hybrid rail
