= Downtown Rowlett station =

DART rail station in Rowlett, Texas

Downtown Rowlett
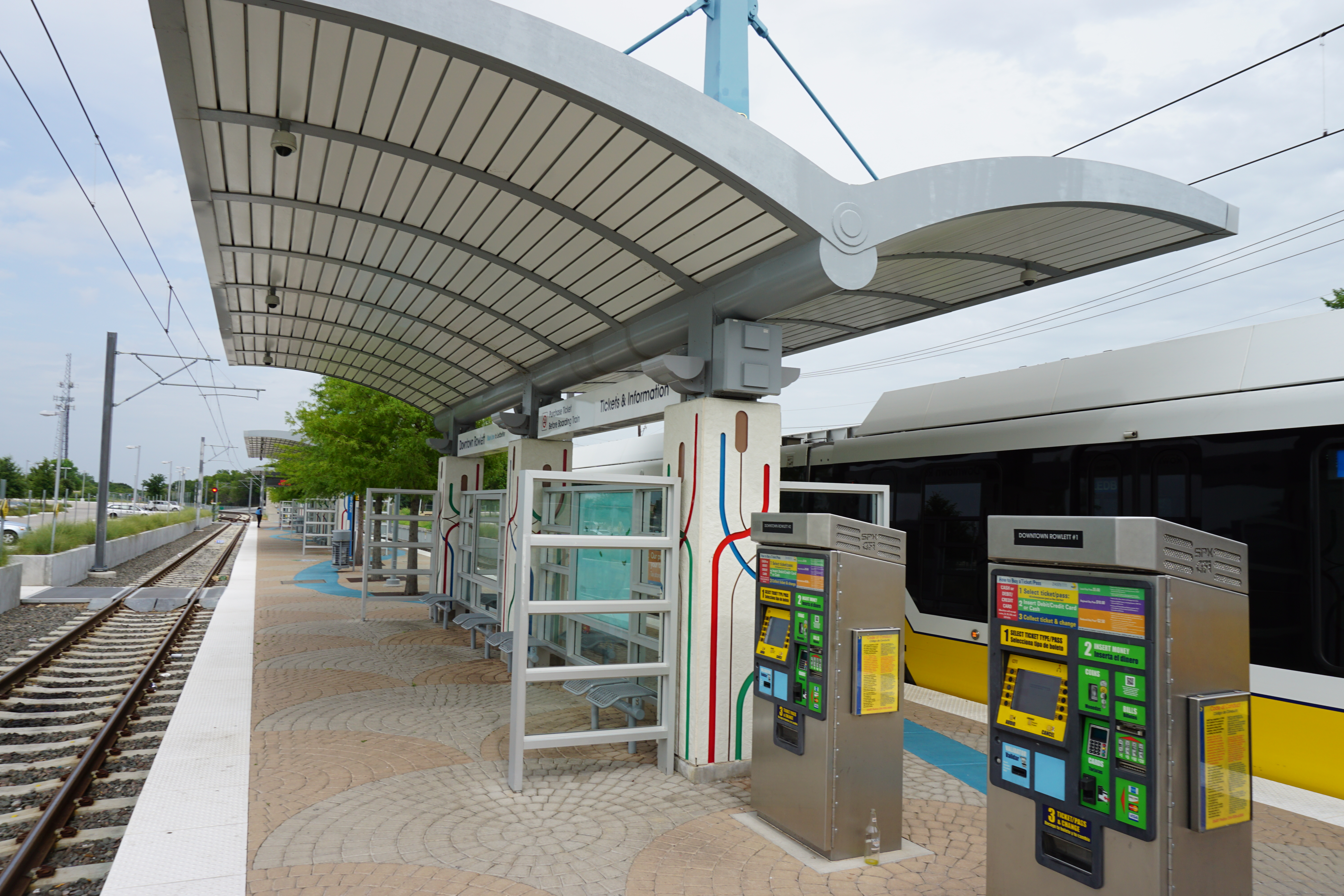
- Downtown Rowlett station in July 2015

General information
- Location: 5000 Martin Drive; Rowlett, Texas
- Coordinates: 32.9042°N 96.5634°W
- System: DART rail
- Owner: Dallas Area Rapid Transit
- Connections: Rowlett GoLink Zone (M-Sun), Southeast Garland GoLink Zone (M-Sun); Rockwall Dial-A-Ride (M-F); Hunt County Connection (M-F)

Construction
- Parking: 750 spaces
- Cycle facilities: 3 lockers, 1 rack
- Accessible: Yes

History
- Opened: May 22, 2000 (bus); December 3, 2012 (rail)

Passengers
- FY 2025: 1,106 (avg. weekday) ▲5%

Services
Preceding station	DART	Following station
Downtown Garland toward UNT Dallas	Blue Line	Terminus
Location

Downtown Rowlett station (previously Rowlett Park and Ride) is a DART rail station in Rowlett, Texas. The station is located in Rowlett's historic downtown district, approximately 1/4 mile (0.40 km) south of Lakeview Parkway (SH 66) and 1/2 mile (0.80 km) west of President George Bush Turnpike (SH 190).

The station is the northern terminus of the Blue Line and the main transfer point for Eastern Pilot GoLink, a microtransit service that serves Rowlett and southeastern Garland. The station is also served by the Rockwall Dial-A-Ride service and a shuttle to Greenville.

== History ==
Dallas Area Rapid Transit originally serviced the city of Rowlett through a park-and-ride lot at Christian City Church, located about 3.5 miles (5.6 km) east of the current station at the intersection of Lakeview Parkway and Dalrock Road. DART paid the church $10,000 per year to lease the site on weekdays.

In 1997, DART announced the construction of a dedicated park-and-ride lot in downtown Rowlett, which would allow for more streamlined bus routes. The facility opened on May 22, 2000, as the Rowlett Park and Ride. The opening of the facility coincided with the introduction of DART On-Call, a demand-response service for Rowlett neighborhoods east of the lot.

The lot was located on a former Missouri–Kansas–Texas rail corridor which DART had purchased for a future extension of its light rail system. On March 25, 2011, DART held a groundbreaking for the extension. Testing began in April 2012, and the completed extension opened on December 3, 2012. In tandem with the opening, the facility was renamed to Downtown Rowlett station.

On September 30, 2016, Hunt County-based transit service The Connection announced the creation of a shuttle route between the station and Greenville.

On May 7, 2018, DART implemented a parking permit system at the station. Certain segments of the lot are reserved on weekdays for drivers with a free permit indicating that they are a resident of one of DART's 14 member cities. A similar system is in use at Parker Road station, though the two permits are not interchangeable.
