= Market Center =

Market Center may refer to:

- Dallas Market Center
  - Market Center station, a DART Light Rail station in Dallas
  - Medical/Market Center station, a train station in Dallas
- Market Center (San Francisco), a skyscraper complex
- Market Center (Baltimore, Maryland), a national historic district

== See also ==
- Market Centre (disambiguation)
