= Wade College =

Private, for-profit school in Dallas, Texas

Coordinates: 32.800386°N 96.818672°W

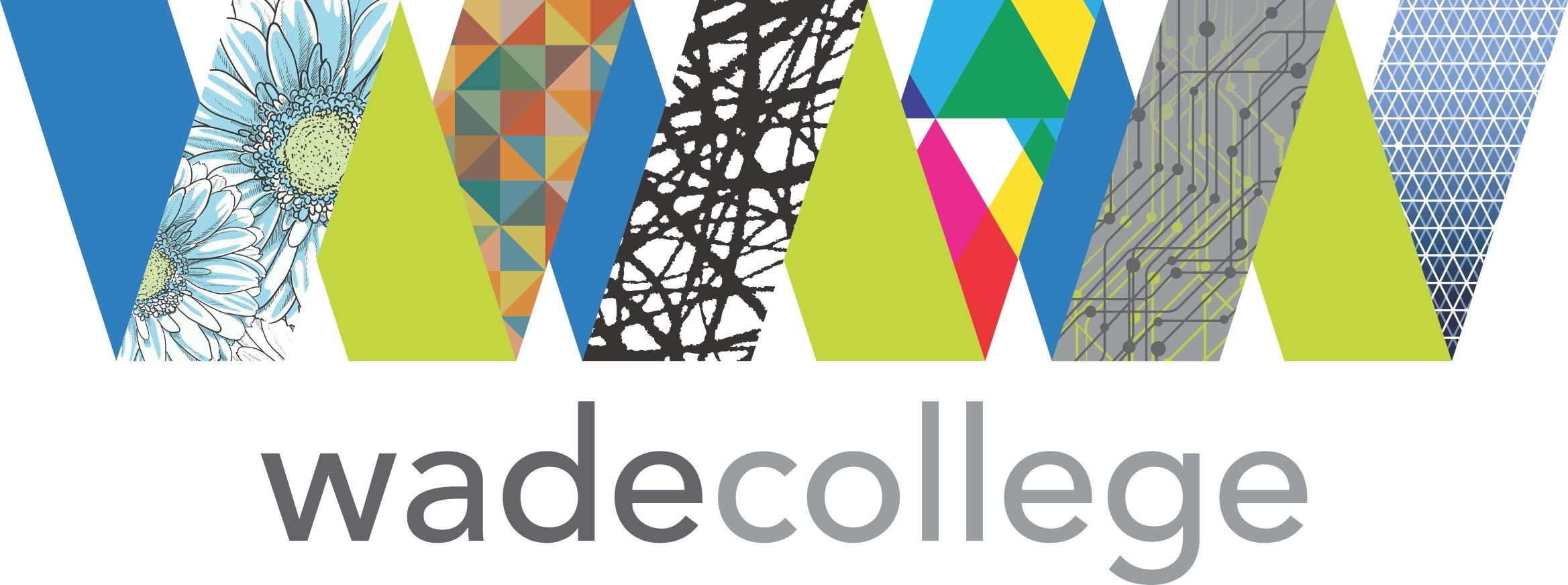
- Logo introduced in 2017
- Type: Private for-profit college
- Established: 1962
- Accreditation: SACS, CIDA
- President: Harry Davros
- Location: 8350 N Central Expy m2200, TX 75206, Dallas, Texas, United States
- Campus: Urban
- Colors: Green and Blue
- Website: www.wadecollege.edu

Wade College is a private for-profit college in Dallas, Texas. It awards associate and baccalaureate degrees. The college was founded in 1962 as Miss Wade's Fashion Merchandising College and renamed Wade College in 1999. The college is located in the Infomart building in the Design District, Dallas.

== History ==
The college was founded by Sue Wade in 1962 and was originally located in the Turtle Creek area. It moved to the Dallas Apparel Mart in the Dallas Market Center area in 1965. It relocated again in 2004 to its current location in the Infomart which is in the heart of the Dallas Design District.

The Wade College logo has evolved from the first Miss Wade's Fashion Merchandising College one designed by a student in the early 1960s, the second was also designed by a student in 2002/2003; and the third was designed in 2009 by Jason Graham former Graphic Design Chairman at Wade College who is currently LA-based graphic designer. The 2014 logo/brand was designed by the Richards Group and RBMM in 2014. The 2014 artwork from the Richards Group was used to create the revised 2017 logo/brand by a Wade College alumnus/marketing director.

Sue Wade, Wade College Founder and Executive Director, was honored by Fashion Group International and awarded their Lifetime Achievement Award in Fashion Education at the annual Night of Stars Gala event on November 16, 2012.

== Accreditation ==
Wade College has been accredited by the Southern Association of Colleges and Schools (SACS) since 1985 to award associate's and bachelor's degrees. The college confers Bachelor of Arts and Associate of Arts degrees in Merchandising and Design.

Wade College received candidacy status from the Council for Interior Design Accreditation (CIDA) in March 2015 and full accreditation from CIDA in April 2019. This accreditation enables students to sit for the National Council for Interior Design Qualification (NCIDQ) exam to become licensed interior designers in the state of Texas.

== Student organizations ==
- Phi Theta Kappa

== Publications ==
D & M Magazine is Wade College's print publication, published once or twice each year. Students, faculty and staff all contribute and highlight current and former students, events, and news.

== Notable alumni ==
- Erin Brockovich attended Wade College and graduated with an associate degree in applied arts in 1980.
- Donna Roy attended Wade College, receiving a degree in design. Roy served as a Executive Director in the Department of Homeland Security's Information Sharing Offices.
