= Stemmons Corridor, Dallas =

Stemmons Corridor
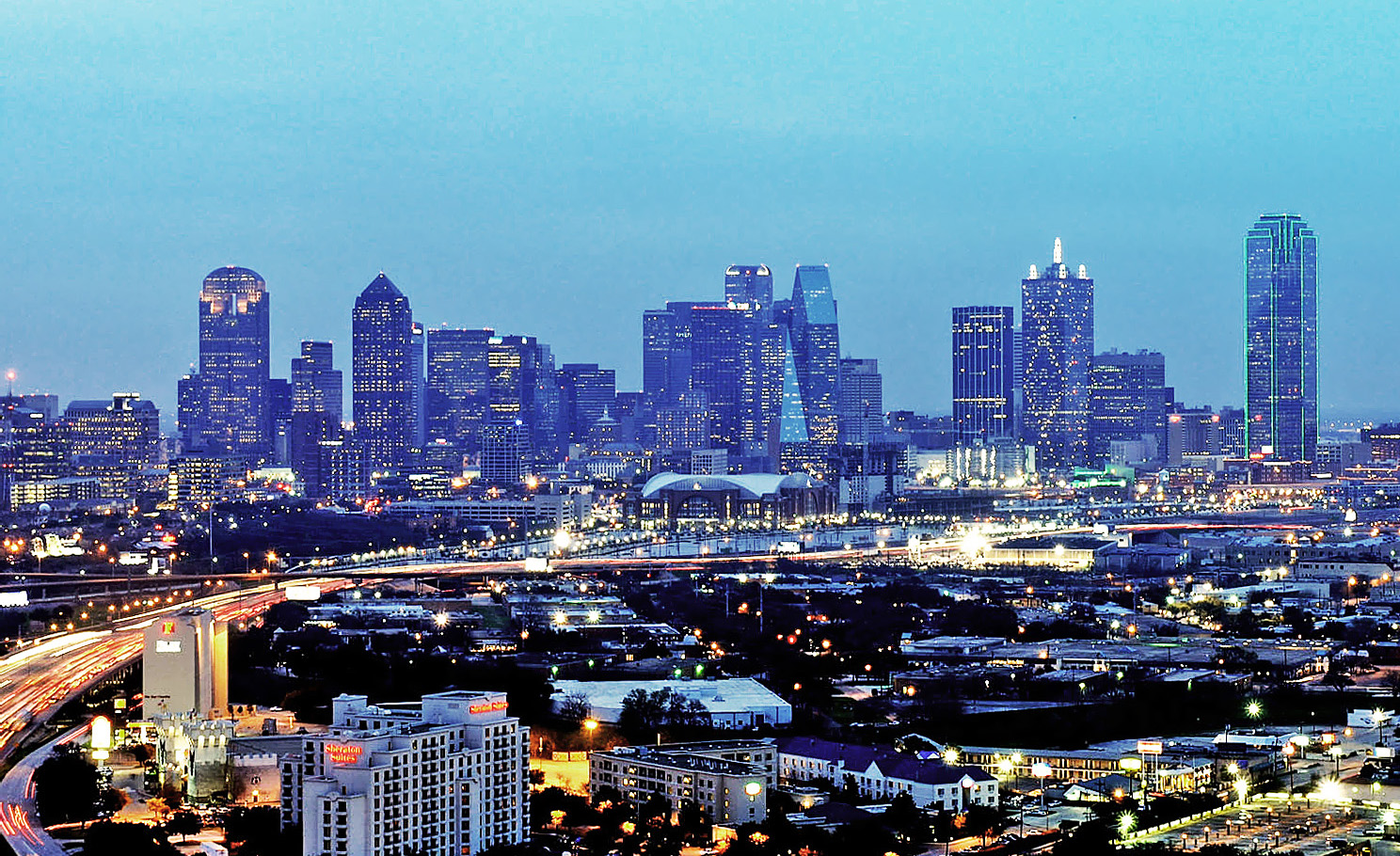
- A portion of the Stemmons Corridor (the buildings at the bottom of the photo, the top is downtown Dallas' skyline.)
- Country: United States
- State: Texas
- Counties: Dallas
- City: Dallas
- Area: northwest Dallas
- Elevation: 397 ft (121 m)
- ZIP code: 75207, 75235, 75247
- Area codes: 214, 469, and 972

The Stemmons Corridor or Lower Stemmons is a stretch of industrial and commercial property in northwest Dallas, Texas (USA). From downtown north, Interstate 35E (I-35E) is known as the Stemmons Freeway, named so for Leslie Stemmons by his son, John M. Stemmons. It lies north of downtown, west of Oak Lawn, east of the Trinity River and Irving, and south of the Elm Fork of the Trinity River. The area has a considerable amount of hotels and office towers. Property in the district accounts for 20% of Dallas' tax base. I-35E in Dallas Texas is currently the widest freeway in the DFW area with 16 total lanes, 10 lanes of high speed freeway with 6 lanes of access roads, stretching from the Woodall Rodgers Expressway in Downtown Dallas to the State Highway 183 split. I-35E is one of the most congested freeways in the country.

== Neighborhoods ==
- Dallas Market Center
- Victory Park (also considered part of downtown or Oak Lawn).
- Arlington Park (also considered a part of West Dallas).

== Other Key Buildings (excluding the Market Center) ==
- Hilton Anatole
- Infomart
- Renaissance Dallas Hotel

== Infrastructure ==
=== Health systems ===
Southwestern Medical Center, Parkland Memorial Hospital (County Hospital), Dallas county Children's Medical center, and St. Paul Hospital is located in the Stemmons Corridor.

=== Transportation ===
==== Commuter rail ====
- Medical/Market Center (TRE station)

==== Light rail ====
- DART: Orange Line and Green Line

==== Highways ====
- Interstate 35E
