= Crow Holdings =

American asset management company

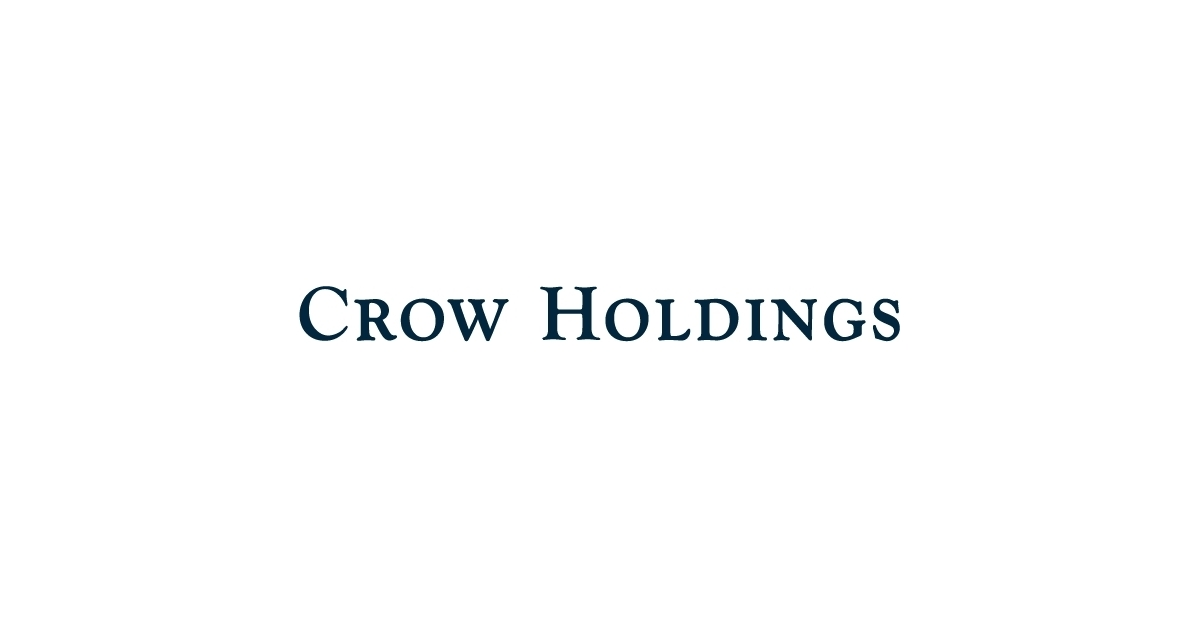
- Type: Private
- Industry: Real estate
- Founded: 1948; 78 years ago
- Founder: Trammell Crow, Harlan Crow
- Headquarters: Dallas, Texas, United States
- Key people: Michael Levy (CEO); Ken Valach (CEO, Crow Holdings Development); Bob McClain (CEO, Crow Holdings Capital); Harlan Crow (chairman)
- AUM: $33 billion (2024)
- Website: www.crowholdings.com

Crow Holdings is a privately held real estate investment and development firm based in Dallas, Texas, US, which has been operating since 1948. The firm provides investment and portfolio management as well as multifamily, industrial, and retail property development through its respective platforms, Crow Holdings Capital and Crow Holdings Development. Originally founded by Trammell Crow, the firm was expanded under the direction of his son, Harlan Crow, and current CEO Michael Levy. As of 2018, the company employed 550 people through its operating businesses in 19 locations throughout the US. As of 2024, Crow Holdings managed $33 billion.

== Business ==
Founder Trammell Crow began developing real estate at the end of World War II. Since then, Crow Holdings has been an active investor and/or developer in industrial, multifamily, office, retail, mart, land and hotel real estate businesses in the US, Europe, and South America. Crow Holdings also holds stakes in privately held businesses and other financial assets.

Crow Holdings subsidiaries include: Crow Holdings Capital and Crow Holdings Development. Trammell Crow Residential, Crow Holdings Industrial, and Crow Holdings Office operate under Crow Holding Development. The firm maintains a broad portfolio of investments including various signature properties including Old Parkland office campus, the Anatole Hotel, the Dallas Market Center, The Brussels Trade Mart and The Windsor Court hotel in New Orleans.

=== Crow Holdings Capital ===
Crow Holdings Capital is an investment management company of Crow Holdings. It was registered in 2011 as an Investment Advisor to continue Crow Holdings private equity real estate fund business which was launched in 1998 with a $281 million fund. As of 2024, Crow Holdings Capital managed $19 billion in assets under management (AUM).

=== Trammell Crow Residential ===
Trammell Crow Residential (TCR) is the multifamily real estate development company of Crow Holdings and primarily focuses on Sun Belt markets. Founded in 1978, TCR develops multifamily real estate projects in major markets across the U.S. During its 40-year history TCR has built over 275,000 multifamily residences. In 1997, TCR was the largest builder of apartments in the US. Since 2014, TCR has been annually ranked in the top ten of the National Multifamily Housing Council’s NMHC’s 25 Largest Developers list. Most recently, TCR was ranked #3 on this list in 2024.

=== Crow Holdings Development ===
Crow Holdings Industrial was launched in 2013 to develop industrial facilities such as distribution, fulfillment, and last-mile logistics centers. Since 2013, it has developed about 60 properties and 23 million square-feet of industrial space for companies such as Amazon, Whole Foods, LG, and Williams Sonoma. During the fourth quarter of 2019, it had 8 million square-feet under construction and $275 million in property sales.

In 2016, CHD opened an office in Southern California, and in 2018, opened additional offices to cover the Midwest and Northeast of the United States. CHD has established more than 285,000 multifamily units since 1977 and more than 68 million square feet of industrial space since 2013.

CHD is committed to the use of green warehouse standards, using green and recycled construction materials whenever possible, and the installation of LED lighting and EV car charging stations is typical of CHI projects.

=== Crow Holdings Office ===
Crow Holdings Office (CHO), launched in January 2020, designs and builds high-end office projects.

CHO is currently expanding its Old Parkland headquarters in Dallas. In 2024, CHO unveiled the largest mass timber office building in North America. Based in Frisco, Texas, this 7-story building sequestered more than “4,000 metric tons of CO2 and generated a 34% smaller CO2 footprint than comparable construction using reinforced concrete.”

== History ==
=== 1948-1979 ===
Trammell Crow built his first warehouse in Dallas, Texas in 1948. From its founding through the 1980s, Trammell Crow Company's (TCC) primary business was the development and management of industrial, office and retail projects. In 1965, Trammell Crow and Mack Pogue founded Lincoln Property Company as a developer and manager of residential communities throughout the US.

By 1971, Trammell Crow was the biggest private landlord in the US, with over $1 billion in real estate. In 1976 and 1977 the company re-organized into three separate but connected entities: the Trammell Crow Company for commercial development; the Trammell Crow Residential Companies for residential development; and Crow Family Holdings, which included the Dallas Market Center, warehouses and hotels. Trammell Crow held the position of CEO until 1977. In 1977 Pogue purchased Trammell Crow's share in the company.

=== 1980s ===
In 1981, Trammell Crow founded Wyndham Hotel Corporation.

In 1982 Trammell Crow Interests was established. TCI was headed by Trammell's son, Harlan Crow. TCI is the predecessor of Crow Holdings. By 1984 Trammell Crow was the biggest real estate developer in the U.S., with 140 million square feet of property in 73 cities.

=== 1990s ===
In 1993, Trammell Crow Residential spun off its Northeastern division to create Avalon Properties Inc, a REIT based in Wilton, Connecticut.

Also in 1993, TCR combined its Atlanta, Dallas, and Houston divisions, as well as Nashville assets to form REIT Gables Residential Trust. Gables Residential issued its IPO in 1994. Gables merged with Lion Gables Apartment Fund LP in 2004, an investment fund managed by ING Clarion Partners and Lehman Brothers. It was then taken private under the name Lion Gables Apartment Fund LP. Clarion acquired Gables Residential in 2015.

In 1996, Homegate Hospitality, Inc., an extended-stay hotel chain, was founded by TCR, Greystar Capital Partners, L.P. and Crow Investment Trust, the real estate investment arm of the Crow Family. In 1997, lodging company Prime Hospitality Corp. acquired Homegate Hospitality, Inc.

In 1997, the Trammell Crow Company went public, trading shares on the New York Stock Exchange. At the time, TCC was one of the largest diversified commercial real estate services companies and the largest commercial property manager in the US. Around this time, several Crow Holdings alumni spun off multifamily development companies such as AvalonBay Communities and AMLI Residential.

Avalon acquired properties from TCR Midwest and TCR Pacific Northwest in 1997 and 1998, respectively. In 1998, Avalon merged with Bay Apartment Communities to create, AvalonBay Communities. It was the first bi-coastal multifamily REIT and, as of 2020 it was the largest apartment REIT in the country by equity market capitalization.

Wyndham merged with hotel REIT Patriot American Hospitality in 1998.

In 1998 Crow Family Holdings dropped “family” from the name of the private holding company. Also in 1998, Crow Holdings closed its first real estate fund establishing the foundation for Crow Holdings Capital. Also in 1998, it acquired TCR South Florida.

=== 2000s ===
Patriot American Hospitality was later converted from a REIT to a corporation and renamed Wyndham International. Blackstone acquired Wyndham International in 2005.

In 2006 Trammell Crow Company was sold to the CB Richard Ellis Group.

In 2008, Crow Holdings moved into its Old Parkland headquarters located in Dallas, Texas, having acquired the historic campus in 2006.

In 2017, Michael Levy was appointed as CEO of the firm. In 2023, Crow Holdings founded Crow Holdings Renewables to develop solar and energy storage assets.

In February 2024, Crow Holdings Capital closed its tenth value-add real estate fund at $3.1 billion. In addition to the primary fund, the company secured co-invest agreements of nearly $600 million. The fund will continue to invest in industrial, multifamily, and specialty real estate.

== Management team ==
Harlan Crow was CEO of Crow Holdings until 2017, remaining as chairman of the board. Anne Raymond was managing director of Crow Holdings until 2017 and is a member of the board. Michael Levy became CEO of Crow Holdings in November, 2017. Ken Valach is the CEO of Crow Holdings Development. Bob McClain is CEO and head of the Real Estate Investment Committee for Crow Holdings Capital.

== Selected properties ==
Crow Holdings specializes in multifamily and industrial projects however throughout its history the company has developed and continues to own several notable properties.

Parkland Hospital was built in 1894, but fell into disrepair after the hospital relocated in 1954. In 2006 Crow Holdings redeveloped the property to office space, renaming it Old Parkland. In 2009 the company moved its headquarters into the renovated building called Old Main.

Trammell Crow developed the Trademart Brussels, Belgium, in 1973, and opened it in 1975.

Trammell Crow was the original developer of the Anatole Hotel in 1979. At the time it was the largest hotel in North Texas, with 900 rooms. A second tower was added in 1984 which added 720 rooms.

In 2009 the company purchased the luxury The Windsor Court Hotel in New Orleans, Louisiana. The hotel was built in 1984 and is known for its Anglophilic styling.

In March 2015, Crow Holdings paid $140 million to buy the Dallas Market Center complex, purchased from CNL Lifestyle Properties, Inc., which co-owned the property with Crow Holdings since 2005. Trammell Crow had first developed the market center in 1957.

== Mergers and acquisition ==
In 1997, BRE Properties acquired the western US assets and operations of TCR, effectively merging TCR-West and BRE to create a REIT with a portfolio of over 21,000 units. In 1997, AMLI Residential acquired a percentage of TCR Midwest while Avalon acquired the remaining portion. In 1998, Merry Land & Investment Co., a publicly held REIT, acquired 13 apartment communities containing over 3,900 units from TCR North Florida.

In 2002 Crow Holdings Industrial Trust was sold as a portfolio of properties to Clarion, which formed the beginnings of the Lion Industrial Trust.

In 2010 Crow Holdings formed the Mill Creek Residential Trust, LLC to develop, operate and buy apartments in major US metropolitan areas. In 2018 the Arizona State Retirement System purchased a 50% stake in Mill Creek Residential Trust.

In October 2025, Crow Holdings recapitalized a national retail portfolio of 194 properties totaling 4.5 million square feet across 30 states.
