= Victory station (disambiguation) =

Victory station may refer to:

- Victory station, a transit station in Dallas, Texas, USA.
- Victory station (Los Angeles Metro), a planned light rail station in Los Angeles, California, USA

It may also refer to:

- The Park Pobedy (Moscow Metro), railway station in Moscow, Russia
- The Ploshchad Pobedy (Площадь Победы, Victory Square) railway station in Minsk, Belarus, part of Maskoŭskaja line
