= Mozee =

Arlington-based autonomous transportation company

- Type: Private
- Industry: Autonomous transportation
- Founded: April 2021
- Founders: Shawn Taikratoke; Jamaal Landry
- Headquarters: Arlington, Texas, U.S.
- Products: Autonomous vehicles
- Services: Transportation solutions
- Website: mozeealong.com

Mozee is an American company headquartered in Arlington, Texas, specializing in autonomous transportation solutions. Founded in April 2021 by Shawn Taikratoke and Jamaal Landry. The company provides driverless, electric, multi-passenger vehicles for campuses and communities. Mozee aims to bridge first-mile and last-mile mobility gaps in controlled speed areas, such as academic and urban districts while promoting sustainability and accessibility.

== History ==
Mozee was founded in April 2021 by Shawn Taikratoke, Jamaal Landry, and Hoyt Fuller, focusing on innovative transportation solutions. In 2025, Mozee announced plans to relocate its headquarters from Dallas, Texas, to Arlington, Texas, where the company expanded to a 63,000 square-foot manufacturing plant. The manufacturing plant will be used to produce the company's 12-passenger electric shuttles.

Mozee will provide several 12-passenger autonomous shuttles on fixed routes, intended for use around AT&T Stadium during the 2026 FIFA World Cup.

== Products and services ==
Mozee's primary products are autonomous, electric vehicles designed for multi-passenger transportation, with a range of approximately 100 miles and capacity for up to 12 passengers. These vehicles are built for controlled speed areas and feature a mobile app for ride booking, route updates, and passenger information. The services aim to reduce traffic congestion and carbon emissions. In March 2025, one of its shuttles was spotted in downtown Austin, Texas, as reported by TechCrunch, highlighting its presence alongside other advanced vehicles like the Tesla Cybertruck.

== Operations ==
Mozee operates in locations such as the University of North Texas, Dallas Design District, and Dallas, Texas. In Arlington, the company provides transportation in the Entertainment District for major events.

== Technology ==
Mozee's vehicles are equipped with self-driving software, which includes sensors, stereo cameras, radar, and IR, which provide a 360-degree view for safe navigation. The software uses computer vision and algorithms to anticipate hazards and optimize real-time routes, enhancing safety and efficiency.

== Partnerships and collaborations ==
Mozee collaborates with the Clarkson University for campus transportation and has a piloted program beginning in June 2025 The company is exploring partnerships with the University of Texas at Arlington to develop vehicle-to-everything (V2X) technology.

In 2025, Mozee partnered with 46 Labs, a Dallas-based communications infrastructure provider, to equip its autonomous vehicles with cellular connectivity and network support.
