= Donna Roy =

American information sharing and access specialist

Donna Roy is an American information sharing and access specialist, working at the US Department of Homeland Security (DHS).

== Education ==
Roy attended Wade College, receiving a degree in Design. She participated in the Key Executive Program at American University, receiving an MPA in Executive Development.

== Career ==
Donna Roy is the Executive Director of US Department of Homeland Security' Information Sharing Environment Office.

Donna joined the US Department of Homeland Security in 2006.

She helped developing the National Information Exchange Model (NIEM), to guarantee secure data exchanges between government agencies.

She led the technical deployment of the Information Sharing Environment (ISE) for the homeland security enterprise.

== Awards ==
In 2012, she was among the winners of the 2012 Federal 100.

In 2014, she won the US Department of Homeland Security Secretary's Award for Excellence, "in recognition of exceptional service and performance in developing the DHS Data Framework to assist with information sharing across DHS".

In 2016, she won with her team the US Department of Homeland Security Secretary's Award for Excellence, "for contributions to the DHS Data Framework as the DHS solution to increase data access and information sharing while improving protections and safeguarding data".
