= Market Centre =

Market Centre may refer to:

- The Market Centre, a shopping mall on Main Street, Letterkenny, Ireland
- The Market Centre, a shopping mall in Crewe, England
- Market centre, a location in Cockermouth, England

== See also ==
- Market square
- Market Center (disambiguation)
