= Southwestern Medical District/Parkland station =

DART rail station in Dallas, Texas

Southwestern Medical District/Parkland
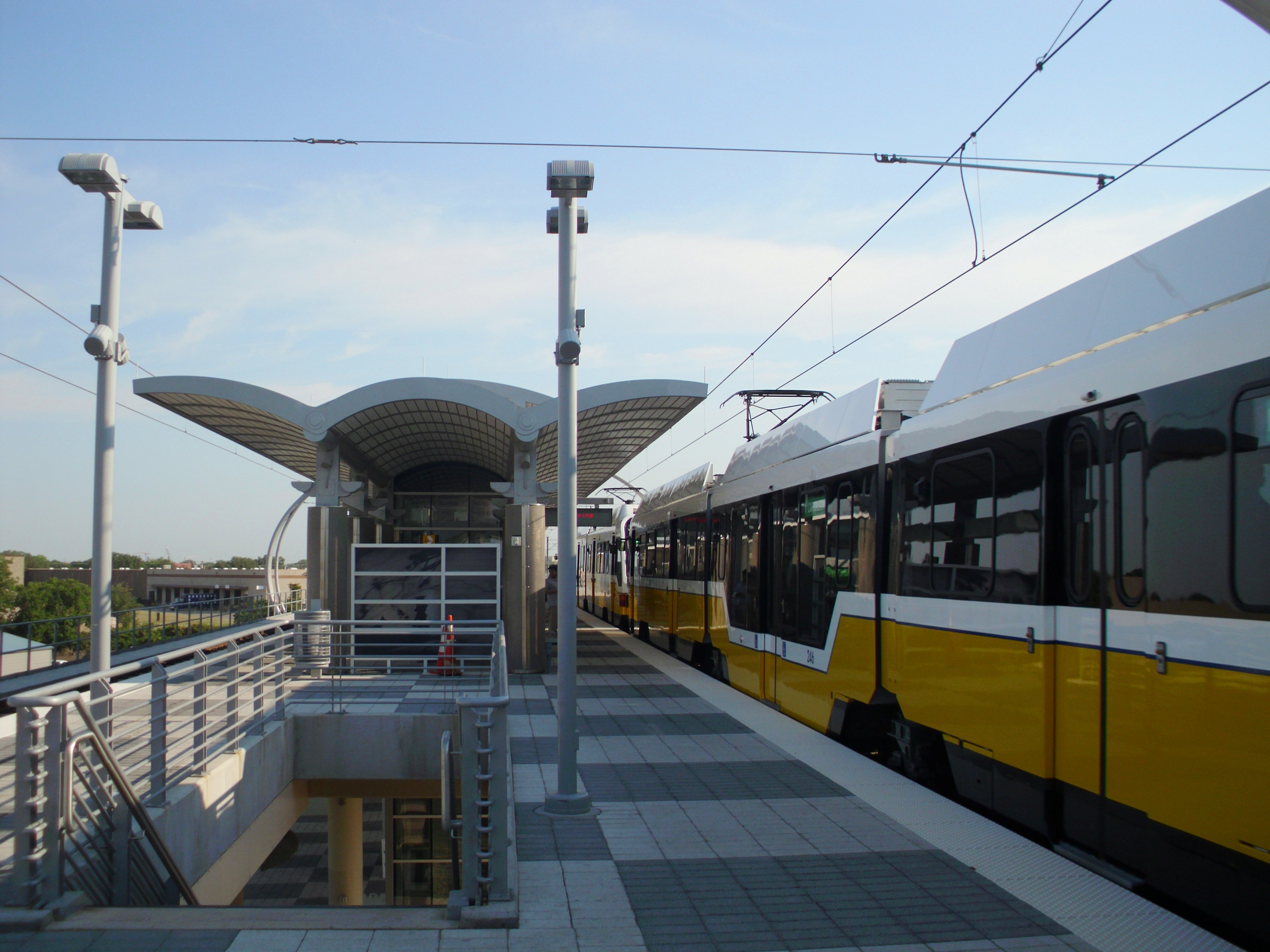
- Southwestern Medical District/Parkland station platform

General information
- Location: 2101 Medical District Drive; Dallas, Texas
- Coordinates: 32°48′49″N 96°50′00″W
- Owner: Dallas Area Rapid Transit
- Platforms: Island platform
- Tracks: 2
- Bus stands: 15
- Connections: DART: 1, 23, 57, 101, 213, 219, 222, 230, 306 (M-F), 422-UT Southwestern Shuttle (M-F); Children's Health Shuttle: DART Route

Construction
- Structure type: Elevated
- Cycle facilities: 2 lockers, 1 rack
- Accessible: Yes

History
- Opened: December 6, 2010

Passengers
- FY 2025: 2,068 (avg. weekday) ▲2.4%

Services
Preceding station	DART	Following station
Inwood/Love Field toward North Carrollton/Frankford	Green Line	Market Center toward Buckner
Inwood/Love Field toward DFW Airport Terminal A	Orange Line	Market Center toward LBJ/Central or Parker Road
Location

Southwestern Medical District/Parkland station (abbreviated SWMD/Parkland station) is a DART rail station in the Southwestern Medical District of Dallas, Texas. It serves the Green Line and Orange Line, and it also serves as a transfer center for nine bus routes.

The station is directly adjacent to Parkland Memorial Hospital. Shuttle routes at the station connect to UT Southwestern Medical Center and Children's Medical Center.

The station opened as part of the Green Line's expansion in December 2010.

== See also ==
- Medical/Market Center station, a Trinity Railway Express station serving the Southwestern Medical District
