= Michelle Larson =

American astrophysicist and academic administrator

President of Clarkson University
- Incumbent
- Assumed office April 1, 2025
- Preceded by: David K. Heacock (acting)

Personal details
- Born: Michelle Beauvais Massachusetts, U.S.
- Children: 1
- Education: Montana State University

Michelle Beauvais Larson is an American astrophysicist and academic administrator serving as president of Clarkson University since 2025. Previously, Larson served for more than a decade as the president and chief executive order of the Adler Planetarium, beginning her tenure in 2013. She was the institution's ninth leader and its first female president.

== Early life and education ==
Larson was born in Massachusetts. As a child, she lived in Turkey due to her father's work as a U.S. Air Force accountant before the family moved to Anchorage, Alaska, when she was ten years old. She is described as a native of Alaska. Larson earned a bachelor's, master's, and doctoral degrees in physics from Montana State University. Her doctoral advisor was Bennett Link. She completed her postdoctoral work in high-energy astrophysics at the California Institute of Technology.

== Career ==
At University of California, Berkeley, Larson's work was funded by NASA to develop programs that brought the science of NASA missions to the public. It was an invitation from NASA to help translate digital images of the sun for use in classrooms and on the internet that led her to discover her calling in science communication. Larson later served as the deputy director of the Center for Gravitational Wave Physics at Pennsylvania State University, where she worked to build awareness of gravitational physics. Larson also served as the deputy director of NASA's Montana Space Grant Consortium, coordinating research and education activities with 24 affiliate campuses.

Larson joined Utah State University in 2006 and served as vice provost and a professor of physics. In her role as vice provost, she worked with deans and department heads and helped the provost's office manage tasks like trimming faculty and budgets. She was also involved in strengthening the university's public outreach, helping to create a Science, Technology, Engineering, Education and Math (STE²M) Center.³ With her husband, she initiated and ran a monthly program called Science Unwrapped, which engaged the public in the workings of modern research.

At age 41, Larson was appointed the ninth president of the Adler Planetarium, becoming the first woman to lead the institution and the first female president of any of the institutions on Chicago's Museum Campus. Her term began on January 1, 2013, succeeding the retiring Paul H. Knappenberger. During her leadership, Larson worked to put the museum on a firmer financial footing, successfully closing a deficit and moving to a balanced budget. She shifted the institution's public approach from one of traditional education to one of engaging people to join in the journey of scientific discovery. This was highlighted by a marketing campaign with the slogan "Space is freaking awesome," which aimed to make the museum feel accessible and fun while taking its science seriously. Under her tenure, attendance grew steadily, hitting a record 568,814 visitors in 2016. The Adler also worked to create exhibits and shows that coincided with major scientific announcements, such as the discovery of gravitational waves and the search for a theoretical ninth planet.

On February 5, 2025, Clarkson University's Board of Trustees announced Larson's appointment as the institution's next president. The selection was made after a search committee, which included students, faculty, alumni, and trustees, considered more than 50 applicants. Her tenure began on April 1, 2025. Larson is the first woman president in the university's 128-year history.

== Personal life ==
Larson is married to Shane Larson, who is also an astrophysicist. They have one daughter. Her husband is a faculty member at Clarkson University's Coulter School of Engineering and Applied Sciences.
