= Victory station =

Mass transit station in Dallas, Texas, United States

Victory
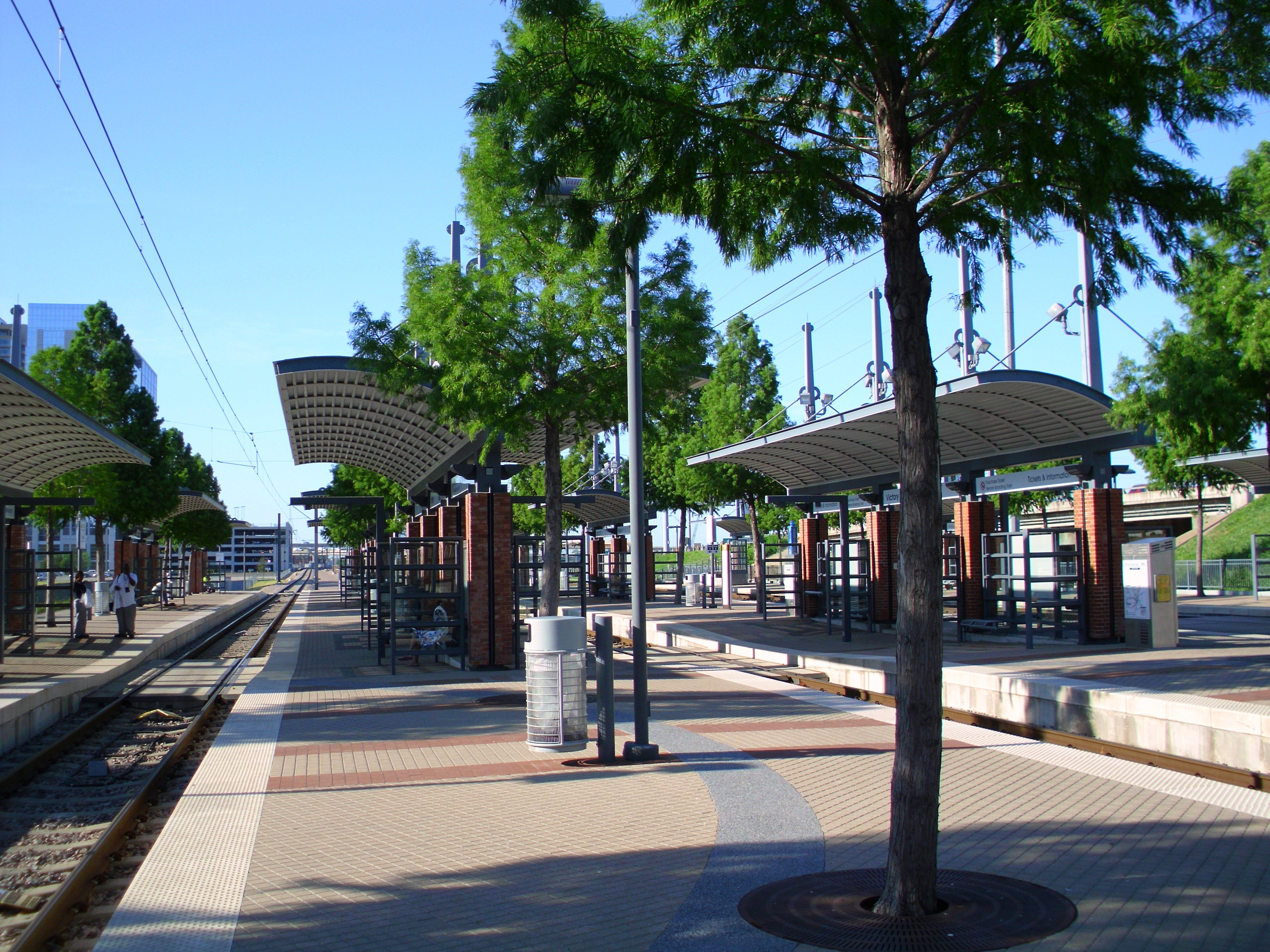
- A view of the DART platform at Victory

General information
- Location: 2525 Victory Avenue; Dallas, Texas
- Coordinates: 32°47′23″N 96°48′45″W
- System: DART rail
- Owner: Dallas Area Rapid Transit
- Platforms: 1 island platform, 1 side platform (DART); 1 island platform, 1 side platform (TRE)
- Tracks: 2 (TRE); 2 (DART)

Construction
- Structure type: At-grade
- Accessible: Yes

Other information
- Fare zone: Eastern Fare Zone (TRE)

History
- Opened: June 28, 2001 (TRE); November 13, 2004 (DART)

Passengers
- FY 2025: 1,601 (avg. weekday) ▲5.8% (DART)
- FY 2025: 573 (avg. weekday) ▼1% (TRE)

Services
Preceding station	DART	Following station
Market Center toward North Carrollton/Frankford	Green Line	West End toward Buckner
Market Center toward DFW Airport Terminal A	Orange Line	West End toward LBJ/Central or Parker Road
Preceding station	Trinity Railway Express	Following station
Medical/Market Center toward T&P Station	Trinity Railway Express	Dallas Union Station Terminus
Location

Victory station is a mass transit station in Dallas, Texas, United States. It serves the Trinity Railway Express commuter rail line, DART rail trains, and DART buses. Located along the Stemmons Corridor in the Uptown neighborhood, the station opened in 2001 in the Victory Park development as a temporary platform shortly after the opening of the American Airlines Center.

== History ==
The station's location was the subject of much debate during the planning and construction of the American Airlines Center. DART originally wanted to extend light rail service up Houston Street, with a station between the proposed center and nearby upscale residential and office areas. But the Dallas City Council, backed by developer Tom Hicks and his Victory Park development partners, forced DART to locate Victory Station on the other side of the center, near the existing freight rail line and Interstate 35E.

On October 2, 2003, the temporary platform was replaced by a permanent platform for the Trinity Railway Express and a future expansion of DART's light rail system (the future Orange and Green Lines). Beginning on November 13, 2004, DART began offering special light rail service on the Red and Blue lines to Victory Station during special events, with the trains serving Victory Station displaying "DART" in their destination signs. Full-time light rail service at the station began on September 14, 2009, with the opening of the Green Line.

On December 6, 2010, the Green Line was extended north to North Carrollton/Frankford station. Special Red and Blue Line service to Victory was discontinued at that date, making transfers to the Green or Orange Line from West End station necessary for passengers coming into Downtown on the Red and Blue Lines.
