= Clarkson University =

Private university in Potsdam, New York

- Former names: Thomas S. Clarkson Memorial School of Technology (1896–1913); Thomas S. Clarkson Memorial College of Technology (1913–1984)
- Motto: A Workman That Needeth Not to be Ashamed (Note: The motto is printed in Clarkson's seal, taken from Thomas S. Clarkson's favorite biblical verse in 2 Timothy 2:15)
- Type: Private research university
- Established: 1896; 130 years ago
- Accreditation: MSCHE
- Academic affiliations: Space-grant
- Endowment: $214 million (2024)
- President: Michelle Larson
- Faculty: 750
- Students: ~4,000
- Location: Potsdam, New York, U.S. 44.664°N 74.998°W
- Campus: Village, 640 acres (2.6 km^{2})
- Other campuses: Schenectady
- Newspaper: The Integrator
- Colors: Green & gold
- Nickname: Golden Knights
- Sporting affiliations: 20 varsity teams NCAA Division I – ECAC Hockey (women's & men's); NCAA Division III – Liberty League
- Mascot: The Golden Knight
- Website: clarkson.edu
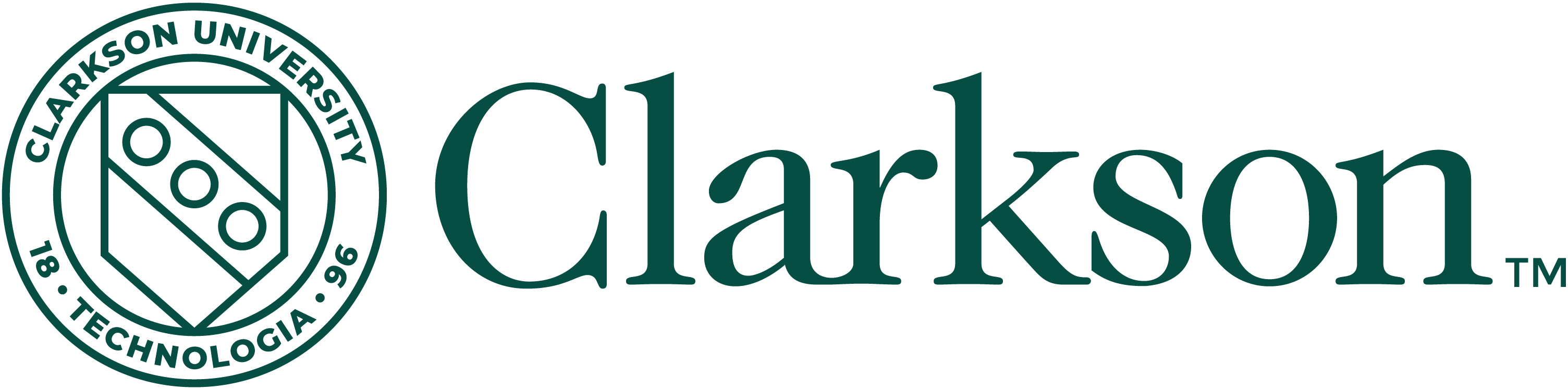

Clarkson University is a private research university with its main campus in Potsdam, New York. Clarkson has additional graduate programs and research facilities in the New York Capital District. It was established in 1896 and enrolled over 4,000 students in 2024. Students pursue bachelor's, master's, and doctoral degrees in each of its schools and institutes: the David D. Reh School of Business, Wallace H. Coulter School of Engineering and Applied Sciences, Earl R. and Barbara D. Lewis School of Health and Life Sciences, Institute for a Sustainable Environment, and Institute for STEM Education. The university is classified among "R2: Doctoral Universities – High research activity".

Clarkson's athletic teams, known as the Golden Knights, compete in 20 varsity sports. While predominantly an NCAA Division III school competing in the Liberty League, both men's and women's ice hockey teams compete in Division I as members of ECAC Hockey. The women's hockey program has won three NCAA championships (2014, 2017, and 2018), marking the university's first national titles.

== History ==
The school was founded in 1896 and was funded by the sisters of Thomas S. Clarkson, a local entrepreneur accidentally killed while working in his sandstone quarry. When a worker was in danger of being crushed by a loose pump, Clarkson pushed him out of the way, risking his own life. He died five days later. The Clarkson family realized great wealth in the development of such quarries, and Potsdam sandstone was highly sought after by developers of townhouses in New York City and elsewhere. The family were important benefactors in the Potsdam area. The school was called the Thomas S. Clarkson Memorial School of Technology.

In 1913, the name was changed to Thomas S. Clarkson Memorial College of Technology, which was used in a shortened version as Clarkson College of Technology (CCT). During the first half of the 20th century, most of the campus was located "downtown". The campus slowly expanded to an area known as the "Hill", located on the southwestern edge of Potsdam village. As of 2001, almost all academics and housing had moved to the hill campus. However, the university still uses the downtown buildings known as Old Snell and Old Main for administrative functions. In 2022, the Clarkson board of trustees named the Hill campus "The Collins Hill Campus" in honor of longtime President Tony Collins.

On February 24, 1984, the school officially became Clarkson University, although the pep band's rallying cry at hockey games is still "Let's Go Tech!". The institution and its hockey team have carried the nickname "Tech" since its 1896 founding. "CCT" is still printed on older school property and equipment.

On February 1, 2016, Union Graduate College merged into Clarkson University and became the Clarkson University Capital Region Campus in Schenectady, New York. This facility was closed in late 2024 and the Schenectady-based personnel transitioned to an office location in Latham, NY.

In the fall of 2023, the board of trustees approved a reorganization plan to gradually phase out all nine majors under the department of humanities and social sciences, as well as the department of communication, media and design, in an effort to cut down on net operating costs. The school of arts and sciences was consolidated with the Coulter School of Engineering and Applied Sciences, and a smaller unit called the department of Arts, Culture and Technology was created.

In 2025, Michelle Larson became the university's 19th and first female president.

== Academics ==
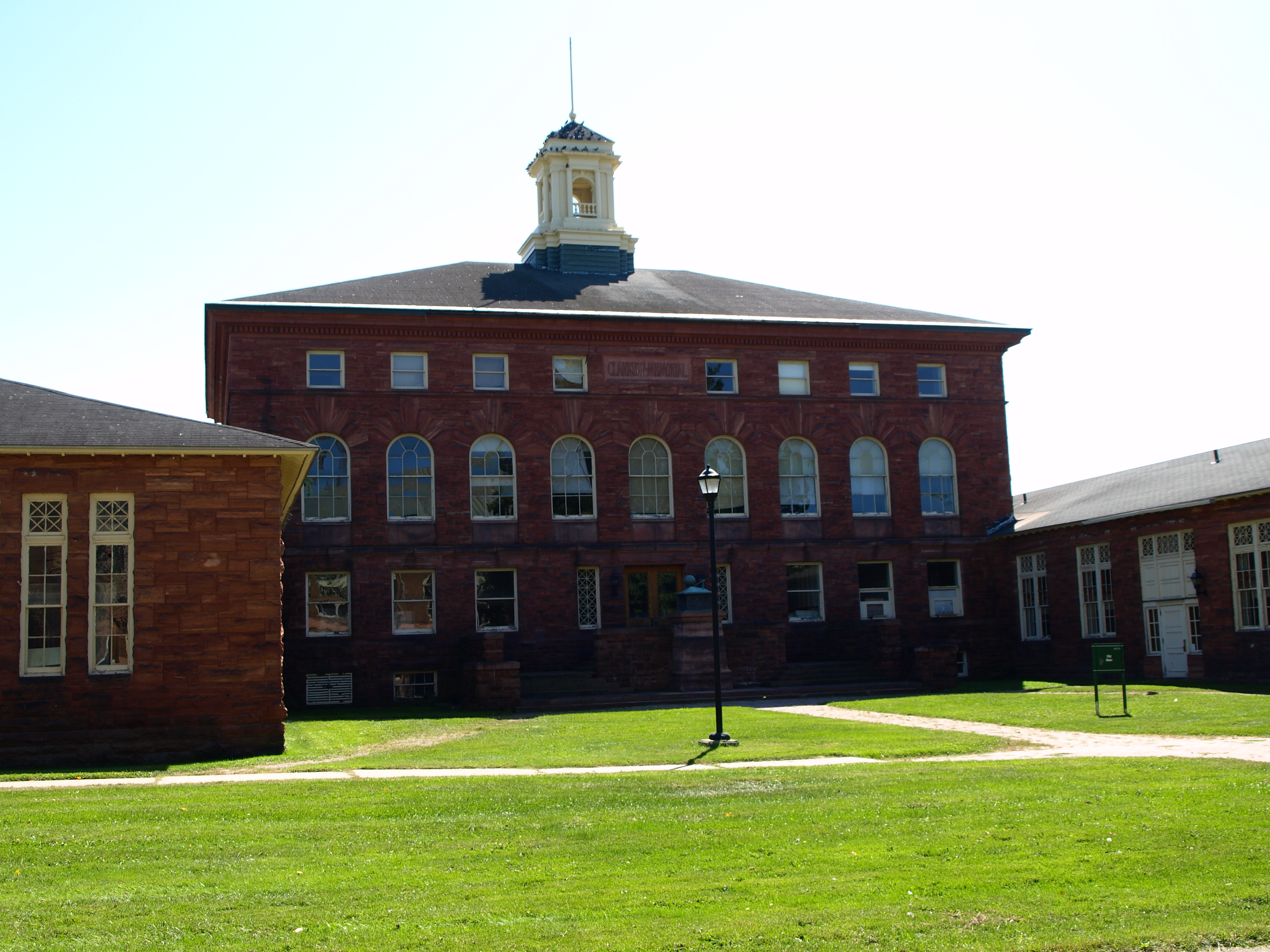
Old Main, 2009

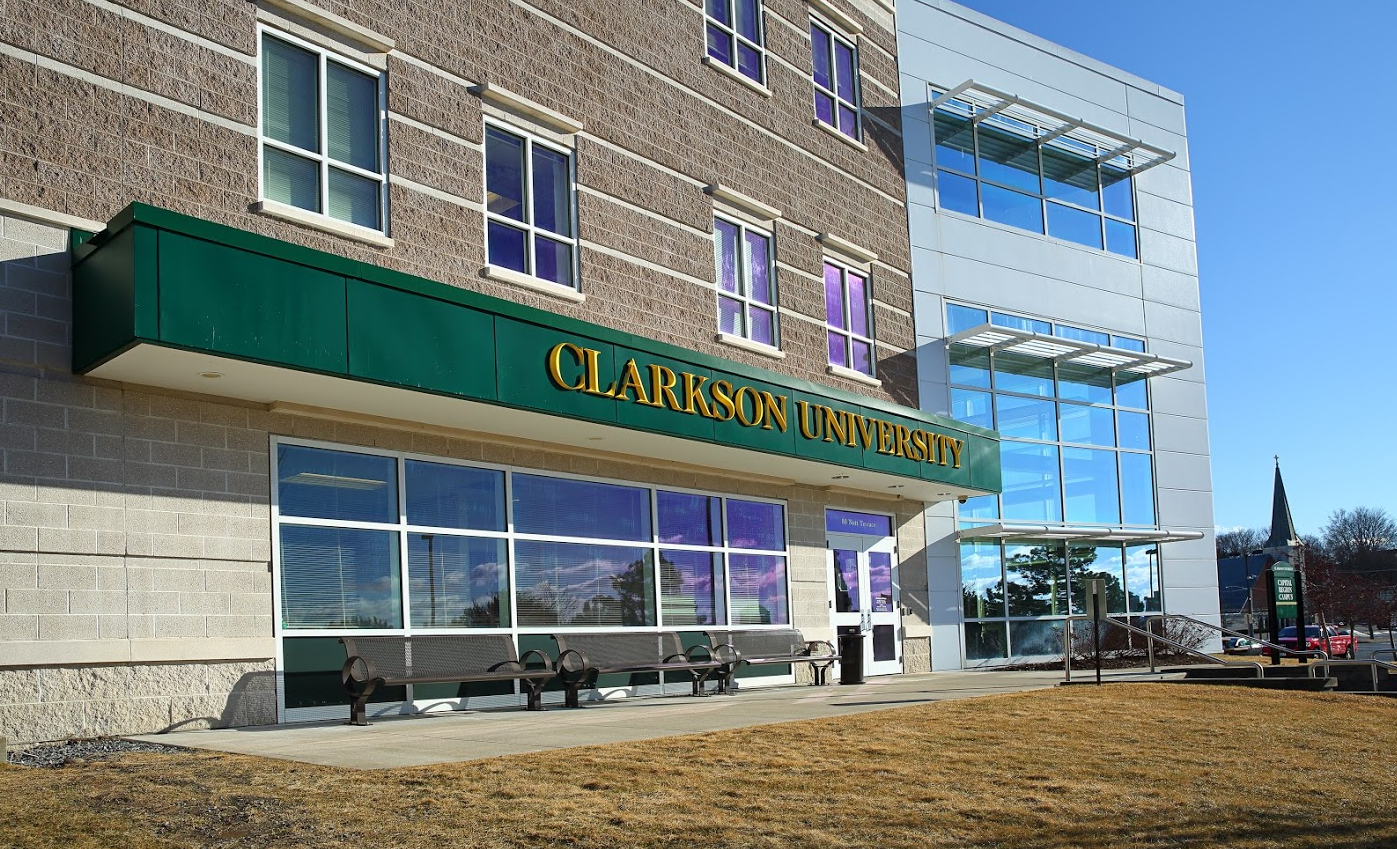
Clarkson University Capital Region Campus in Schenectady, New York, 2016

More than 50 undergraduate majors and minors are available at the university. The university also offers master's and doctoral degrees. These degree programs are offered through the David D. Reh School of Business, Institute for a Sustainable Environment, Wallace H. Coulter School of Engineering and Applied Sciences, the Earl R. and Barbara D. Lewis School of Health and Life Sciences, Institute for STEM Education, and the Clarkson School. Clarkson University is home to the Center for Advanced Materials Processing (CAMP). CAMP is dedicated to developing Clarkson's research and educational programs in high-technology materials processing. It focuses on developing innovations in advanced materials processing and transferring this technology to businesses and industries. The center receives support from the New York State Office of Science, Technology, and Academic Research for research and operating expenses as one of 14 Centers for Advanced Technology (CATs). In addition, CAMP-related work receives several million dollars each year from the federal government and private industry.

Clarkson's 15 Student Projects for Engineering Experience and Design (SPEED) teams allow students across all majors to participate in hands-on, extracurricular projects.

Clarkson participates in student exchange programs with schools in Europe and Australia.

=== Rankings ===
U.S. News & World Report's 2019 rankings "America's Best Colleges" placed Clarkson University in the top 125 institutions in the nation and listed on the "Great Schools, Great Prices" list. Clarkson's supply chain management program was listed as one of the top 20 in the nation. The survey editors also placed Clarkson in the "A+ Options for B Students" list and the "Best Colleges for Veterans" list in the National University category.

Academic rankings

National
- Forbes: 243
- U.S. News & World Report: 152
- Washington Monthly: 79
- WSJ/College Pulse: 202

Global
- QS: 951-1000
- THE: 801–1000
- U.S. News & World Report: 1344

Clarkson University ranked #8 among "Top Salary-Boosting Colleges" nationwide in Money's 2015 rankings.

Clarkson's online graduate business program is #12 nationwide (U.S. News & World Report 2013).

Clarkson is ranked among the nation's most environmentally responsible colleges by Princeton Review Guide to Green Colleges: 2019 edition.

U.S. News & World Report's Best Graduate Schools 2019 ranked Clarkson 40th overall in Environmental Engineering.

=== The Clarkson School ===
The Clarkson School, a special division of Clarkson University, was founded in 1978. The school offers students an early entrance opportunity into college, replacing the typical senior year of high school with a year of college. It is one of few college early admission programs in the country that provides a community living/learning experience on a university campus.

The Clarkson School's Bridging Year is a "bridging year" between high school and college for students who are ready to enter college early. Every year, 50 to 80 high school students are accepted to The Clarkson School, where they may work towards a GED and take college classes. They may also work with their high schools to complete a high school diploma or drop out of high school entirely. After they complete the program, they can enter Clarkson University with all credits from the previous year or transfer to another school, usually as freshmen with advanced standing.

Students in The Clarkson School are fully matriculated undergraduates with freshman status at the university. They take classes with other University students and usually carry a course load of 15 to 18 credits per semester for two semesters. College credits may also be given for college and Advanced Placement courses taken before entering The Clarkson School. Cross-registration at colleges and universities in neighboring areas can provide additional college credits, particularly in art, music, and languages. These credits also appear on an official Clarkson University transcript.

The Clarkson School students are housed in Newell House and Ormsby House in Price Hall and the typical class size is about 50 students. Students participating in this program are often called "Schoolies" by other Clarkson students.

=== Clarkson Ignite ===
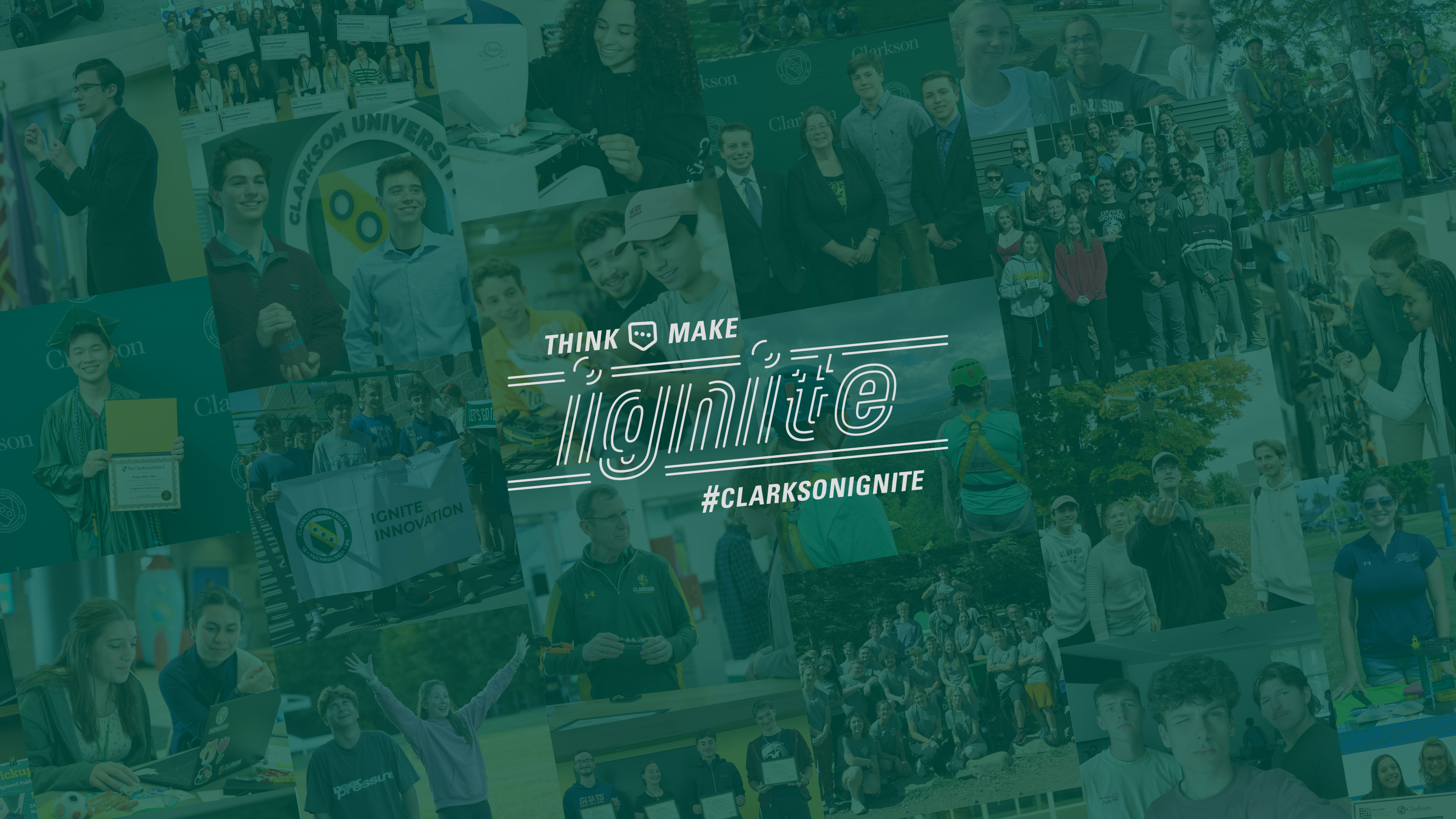
The main promotional banner for Clarkson Ignite, seen on its social media pages and across the Clarkson campus

Founded in 2017, Clarkson Ignite is Clarkson University's innovation hub, providing students and members of the Clarkson community with various unique opportunities for experiential learning. Ignite oversees two hands-on learning facilities known as the Dorf Makerspace and Makers' Loft, which contain equipment for physical and digital creation, such as 3D printers, laser engravers, heat presses, digital cameras, sewing machines, and drones, among other tools. These facilities are staffed by Maker Mentors, specially-trained student workers who have chosen to take their passions for "Making" to the next level.

Ignite hosts multiple annual events and competitions, including the Ignite Project Expo, Research and Project Showcase, President's Challenge, and North Country Regional Business Plan Competition, which engage with students across all majors and academic standing. The organization also offers several opportunities for aspiring student entrepreneurs to develop and grow unique business ideas, with its Cube student business accelerator having supported several successful startup endeavors, including cement replacement producer KLAW Industries

Each year, 10 incoming students receive the Ignite Presidential Fellowship, a scholarship that covers the cost of tuition across up to eight semesters worth of undergraduate study. Along with a similar award known as the Young Innovators & Entrepreneurs scholarship, Ignite supports recipients throughout their entire time at Clarkson, planning special events and activities, such as an exciting Pre-Orientation week before classes begin each August. Several Ignite Presidential Fellows (dubbed "IPFs") have made significant positive impacts at Clarkson and outside of academia, with multiple being recipients of the Levinus Clarkson and Frederica Clarkson Awards (given to the top seniors in each graduating class).

== Campus ==
Clarkson has two campuses in Potsdam—the "downtown" campus and the Collins Hill Campus—and the Capital Region Campus in Schenectady, New York.

The health science departments of Occupational Therapy, Physical Therapy, and Physician Assistant Studies are located on the downtown campus. The campus bookstore is located in downtown Potsdam. The last student dormitory (Congdon) located on the downtown campus closed in May 2006. The only buildings remaining in Clarkson's service at the downtown campus are a few administration buildings, the Army ROTC house, the Clarkson Hall Center for Health Sciences (physical therapy and physician assistant studies), and the Peyton Hall Business Incubator. Other downtown campus buildings contain leased space for businesses.

=== Athletics ===
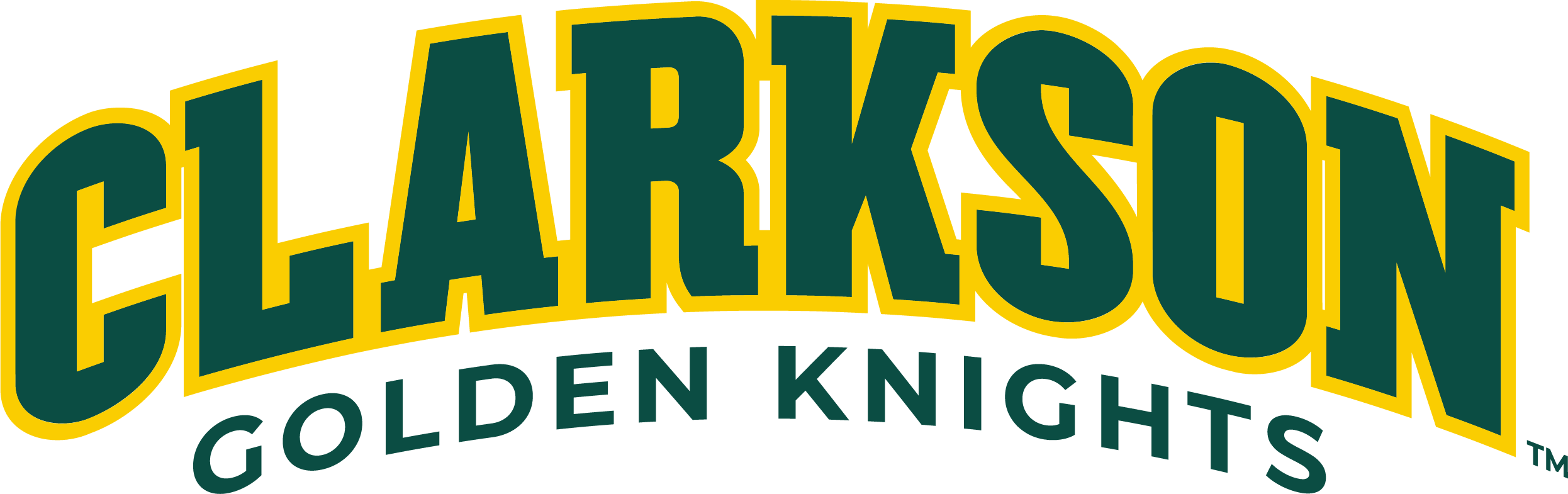
Clarkson Golden Knights wordmark

Clarkson's athletic teams are known collectively as the Golden Knights. There are 20 varsity athletic teams. Except for the men's and women's alpine and Nordic skiing, all of these teams compete in the NCAA.

While Clarkson is an NCAA Division III school, both the men's and women's ice hockey teams compete in Division I, with both teams playing in ECAC Hockey. The men's team is a traditional power in the ECAC. They have won 6 ECAC Tournament Championships, most recently in 2019. Clarkson's most recent NCAA tournament was as the number two seed in the 2019 NCAA Northeast Regional, where they lost in overtime to the University of Notre Dame, 3–2, in the 1st round.

The women's team has appeared in every tournament since entering the ECAC in 2004 and has appeared in four NCAA tournaments, winning the 2018 edition, 2017 edition, and 2014 edition, the first three NCAA titles won by the school, the first NCAA ice hockey title won by a school in St. Lawrence County, and the first Division I NCAA championship won by a school from the North Country.

Division III varsity teams compete in the Liberty League conference and include baseball, men's and women's basketball, men's and women's cross country, men's golf, men's and women's lacrosse, men's and women's soccer, softball, men's and women's swimming, and women's volleyball.

The men's and women's alpine skiing and Nordic skiing teams compete in the MacConnell Division of the Eastern Collegiate Ski Conference (ECSC) within the United States Collegiate Ski and Snowboard Association (USCSA). They are top contenders in their division and conference almost every year and have consistently qualified for the annual USCSA National Championships numerous times. In 2019, the women's Nordic team was the USCSA national champion, and the men placed second.

Other non-varsity clubs include men's and women's ice hockey, men's lacrosse, men's and women's rugby union, men's soccer, combined men's and women's crew, and ultimate frisbee. Clarkson's combined men's and women's club racquetball team won the Division II title at the USRA National Tournament in 2005. In 2010, the school started a club football team.

"The Golden Knight" is the university's hockey mascot, which can be seen at hockey games waving the Clarkson flag. The nickname "Golden Knights" was first suggested in an editorial of the October 28, 1950 issue of the Clarkson Integrator, and was in use by the following month.

=== Clubs ===
Clarkson University's Student Association (CUSA) sponsors more than 130 clubs and organizations, the largest of which are the Outing Club, Ski Club, Cornhole Club, the Clarkson Pep Band, and the Clarkson Union Board. All CUSA-sponsored clubs are entirely student-run, and undergraduate and graduate students are welcome to join.

The Clarkson Union Board (CUB) is the campus's programming board. CUB hosts various campus events throughout the semester and co-sponsors events with other organizations, university offices, and departments. CUB provides professional quality audio and visual support for on-campus events and hosts the annual SpringFest/FallFest concerts. Previous performers have included Yung Gravy, bbno$, Panic! at the Disco, Jay Sean, and The All-American Rejects.

==== K2CC ====
The Amateur Radio Club (K2CC) was established in 1922 and is the university's oldest organization, still active today. The club offers two licensing exam sessions per semester and interacts regularly with the local community. K2CC has both analog and digital voice repeaters and maintains a contest and experimentation room equipped with DX, weak signal, and satellite radios and antennas.

==== WTSC ====
With WTSC 91.1 FM The Source, Clarkson also offers one of the North Country's most popular radio stations run completely by the student body. Students can broadcast their shows and provide various music, from rap to alternative, classical rock to street punk. The station has well over 1,000 CDs and nearly 24 Terabytes of music from vinyl. The station has a fully equipped broadcast studio (studio A), a second studio for mixing (studio B), and a fully functional recording studio.

==== Golden Knotes ====
Clarkson Golden Knotes is the Co-ed a cappella group on campus that formed in the Spring of 2002. Every semester, a Final Performance showcases the songs the group worked on that semester. The group also performs at various events on campus. Each year, executive board members hire music students from the neighboring Crane School of Music to serve as music directors of the group.

==== FIRST Robotics ====
Clarkson Robotics brings Clarkson University students together with local high school students to design, build, and test a robot that competes in the FIRST Robotics Competition each year.

==== Applied Computer Science Labs ====
Applied CS Labs - The Applied Computer Science Labs at Clarkson University consist of the Clarkson Open Source Institute, the Internet Teaching Lab, and the Virtual Reality Lab. However, only the first two are populated. These labs, collectively referred to on campus as COSI, are almost entirely student-run, offering the opportunity to gain experience in managing both facilities and projects. All three labs are located on the 3rd floor of the Science Center in rooms SC334 and SC336. The Applied CS Labs is home to Clarkson University's open-source mirror, which serves downloads for popular projects like Blender (software) and the Ubuntu operating system, among many others.

==== Clarkson Pep Band ====
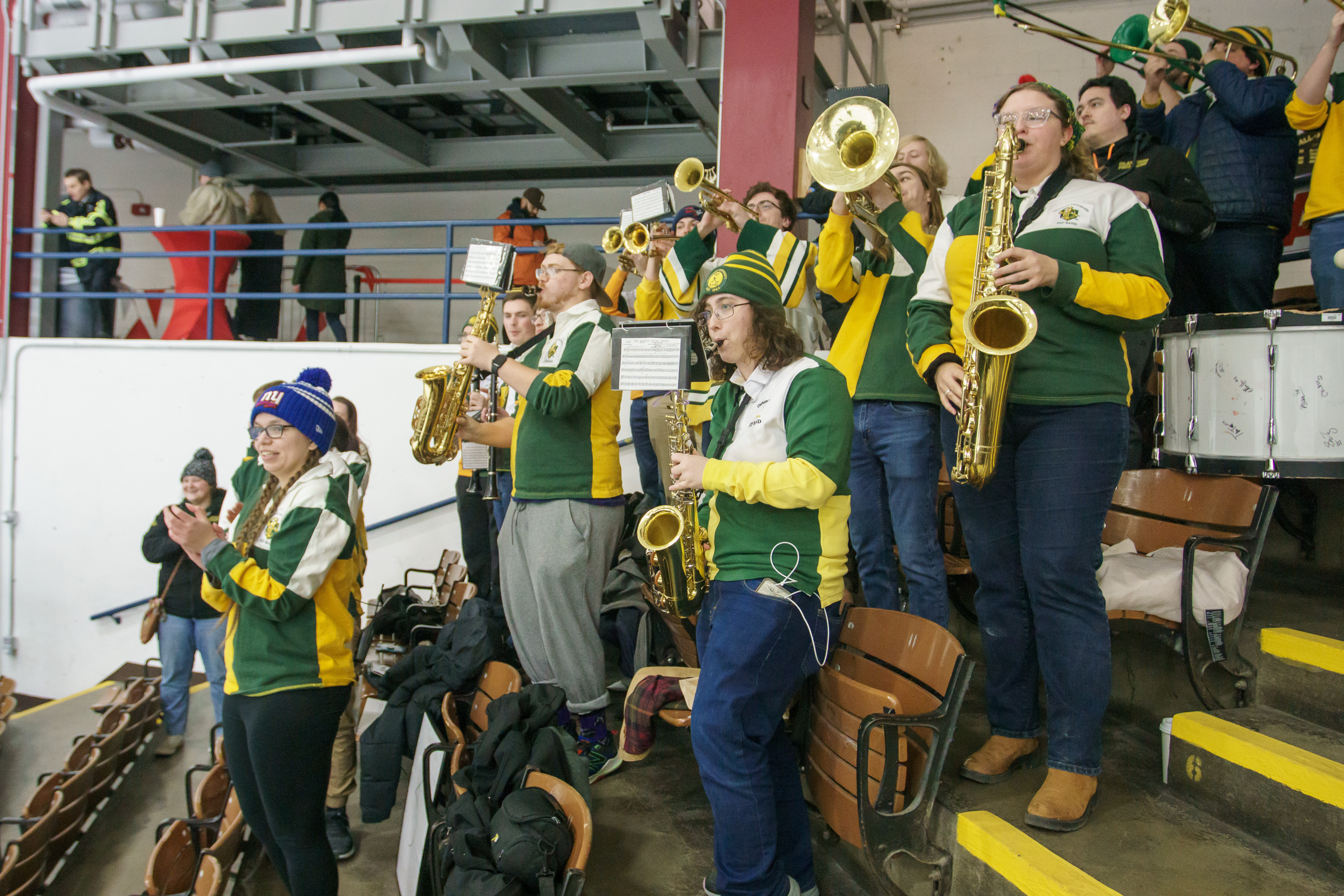
Clarkson's Pep Band traveled to Brown's Meehan Auditorium in 2023

The Clarkson University Pep Band is a student-run organization that supports the Clarkson University Golden Knights ice hockey teams. The band comprises approximately 75 full-time members and performs at Clarkson's Cheel Arena at all home games for the Men's NCAA Division I hockey team and some for the women's NCAA Division I hockey team.

The band also travels to Clarkson Men's ECAC Hockey conference away games with 35–40 members (unless restricted by the policies of the opposing team's arena) and post-season tournaments.

The Clarkson University Pep Band was founded in the fall of 1964 by a small group of Clarkson students.

==== Clarkson Theatre Company ====
The Clarkson Theatre Company (CTC) is a student-run theatre group, part of Clarkson University, and supported by the Clarkson University Student Association (CUSA). CTC's mission is to provide theatrical entertainment and an outlet for artistic self-expression in the realm of the theatre arts at Clarkson. Membership consists of students and faculty from Clarkson and the other Associated Colleges of the St. Lawrence Valley (SUNY Potsdam, SUNY Canton, and St. Lawrence University)

Every fall, CTC puts on a musical over Clarkson University's family weekend, sometime in mid-to-late October. The production time for this show is between 5 and 7 weeks. After the fall production is over, preparations for the One Act Festival begin. This festival is made up of short plays chosen and directed by students, as well as several written by students. This festival is usually put on as a fundraiser for a charity selected by the executive board and takes place at the end of January or the beginning of February. The next show, usually a straight play, is put on near the beginning of April. Show choice for each slot is not limited to a musical or play, but it is traditional to use this structure; as a general member, vote chooses shows; however, any show can be selected to be put on any semester.

Wes Craven, creator of the A Nightmare on Elm Street franchise, was a professor at Clarkson University in 1968, as well as faculty adviser to the Clarkson Drama Club (the predecessor of the current Clarkson Theatre Company). As part of one of Professor Craven's classes, Humanities IV, several Theta Chi members wanted to make a spoof of traditional horror movies about the strange occurrences in their fraternity's house at 18 Elm Street. The filming included CTC's home, Old Snell Hall, where the boiler room scene took place in the basement. While none of those involved had much film experience, they made the film for about $300, and it was shown twice on campus. Much of Craven's inspiration for A Nightmare on Elm Street came from this first filmmaking experience; the house in the movie, while not the house used in the first version, resembles this house and also resides on Elm Street.

=== Fraternities and sororities ===
Clarkson social fraternities began organizing on campus in 1903. Several local organizations accepted members from both Clarkson and SUNY Potsdam. In 1977, the first Clarkson-only sorority was founded, and in 1987, Clarkson discontinued recognition of the local sororities at SUNY Potsdam.

=== Publications and media ===
- The Integrator is a weekly student-run newspaper.
- WCKN Television is a student-run television station and the local cable system's public access station.
- WTSC Clarkson Radio is a student-run radio station.
- The Clarksonian is a student-run yearbook publication group.

=== ROTC ===
Clarkson University hosts both the Army ROTC and Air Force ROTC programs for not only Clarkson students, but also students enrolled at the State University of New York at Potsdam, the State University of New York at Canton, and St. Lawrence University. ROTC has been an institution at Clarkson since May 1936, when the first ROTC Battalion was activated during the tenure of College President James S. Thomas. The ROTC program at Clarkson has commissioned well over 1,150 military officers; these alumni have been represented at each level of the Officer Corps, from Second Lieutenant to General.

==== Army ROTC ====
The Clarkson Army ROTC Battalion (officially the "Golden Knight Battalion") is one of 274 Army ROTC battalions in the United States. The average size of the Golden Knight Battalion is 100 Cadets, the majority of whom are Clarkson students.

== Transportation ==
The autonomous transportation company Mozee has partnered with the university to provide campus transportation for students, beginning with a pilot program in June 2025.

== Notable staff ==
Ernest Blood, basketball coach

== See also ==
- Association of Independent Technological Universities
