= Windsor Court Hotel =

Coordinates: 29.9497°N 90.0664°W

The Windsor Court
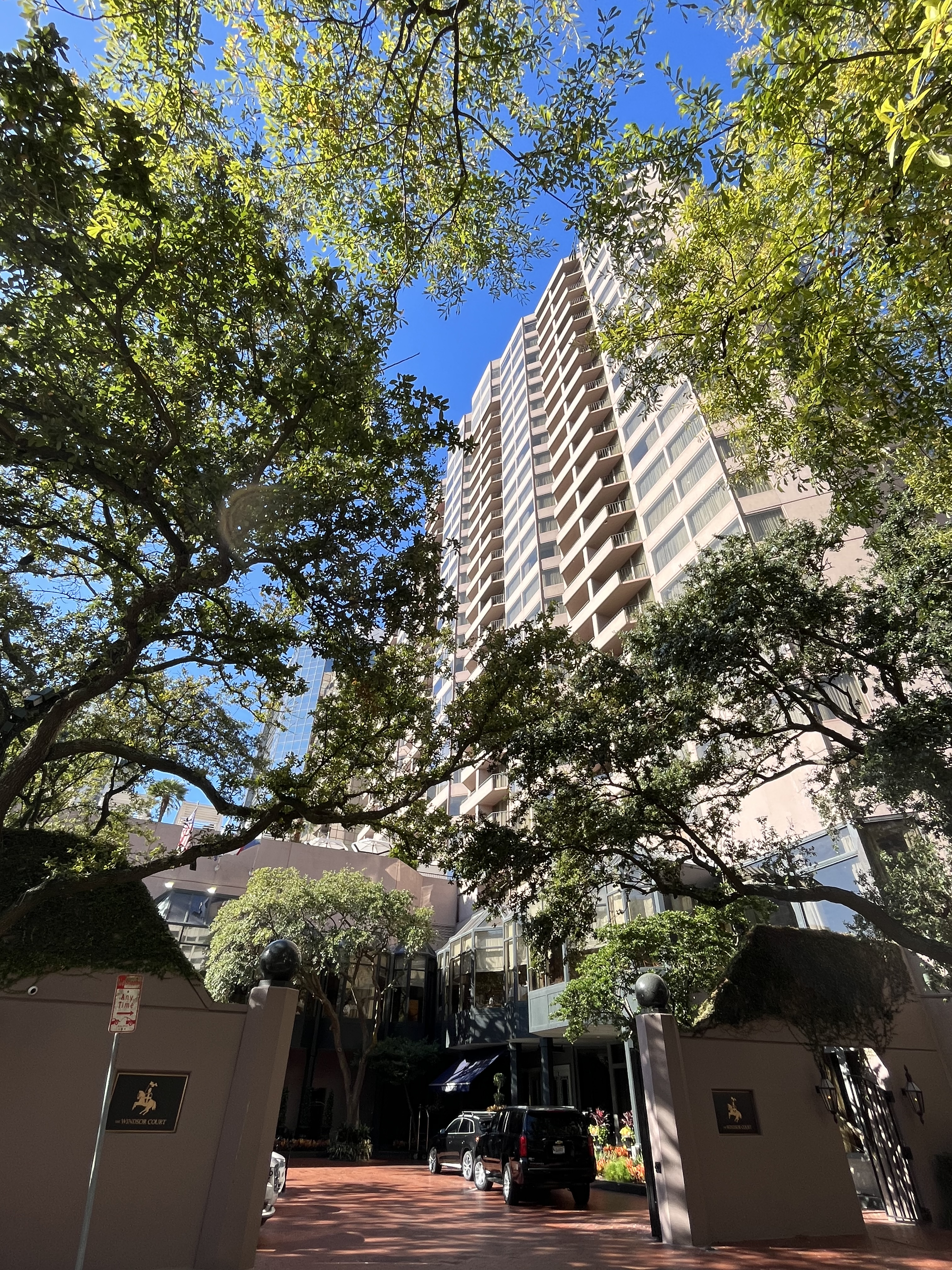

General information
- Type: Hotel
- Location: 300 Gravier Street, New Orleans, Louisiana; United States
- Completed: 1984
- Opening: 1984
- Owner: The Berger Company & Crow Holdings

Height
- Roof: 253 ft (77 m)

Technical details
- Floor count: 23

Design and construction
- Architect: Morris Architects
- Developer: Orient-Express Hotels

The Windsor Court is a luxury hotel in the Central Business District of New Orleans, Louisiana. The building rises 253 feet (77 m). It contains 23 floors, and was completed in 1984. In 2011, Travel + Leisure magazine ranked The Windsor Court as the 6th Best Large City Hotel in the United States and Canada. The Windsor Court currently stands as the 37th-tallest building in the city, and the 10th-tallest hotel. The building is an example of modern architecture.

The building houses a 4-star hotel with 314 guest rooms and features an extensive collection of European art and antiques valued at more than $12 million.

The hotel was one of the least damaged buildings of New Orleans when Hurricane Katrina made impact, suffering only minimal damage and escaping floodwaters. The damage included broken windows in the upper floors and minor flooding from rain that fell inside as a result of the broken windows.

== History ==
The hotel opened in 1984 by Morris Architects. In 2009 an investment team purchased the hotel, led by The Berger Company and Crow Holdings. In 2011-2012 the hotel underwent a renovation. It was a $22 million project that updated the guestrooms and the lounge, as well as revitalized the pool area, and added The Windsor Court Spa. In 2018 the hotel underwent another renovation, worth $15 million that included the addition of a Poolside Bar, and the renovation of all the hotel's rooms.

== Restaurants & Bars ==
The hotel has several dining establishments, including The Grill Room - which is the only AAA Four-Diamond and Forbes Five-Star rated restaurant in the city. The hotel's second-floor The Polo Club is also a popular location for live jazz music and is known for its artwork collection.

== See also ==
- List of tallest buildings in New Orleans
- Buildings and architecture of New Orleans
