= Trademart Brussels =

Business-to-business wholesale trade centre in Brussels, Belgium

Coordinates: 50°53′52″N 4°20′34″E

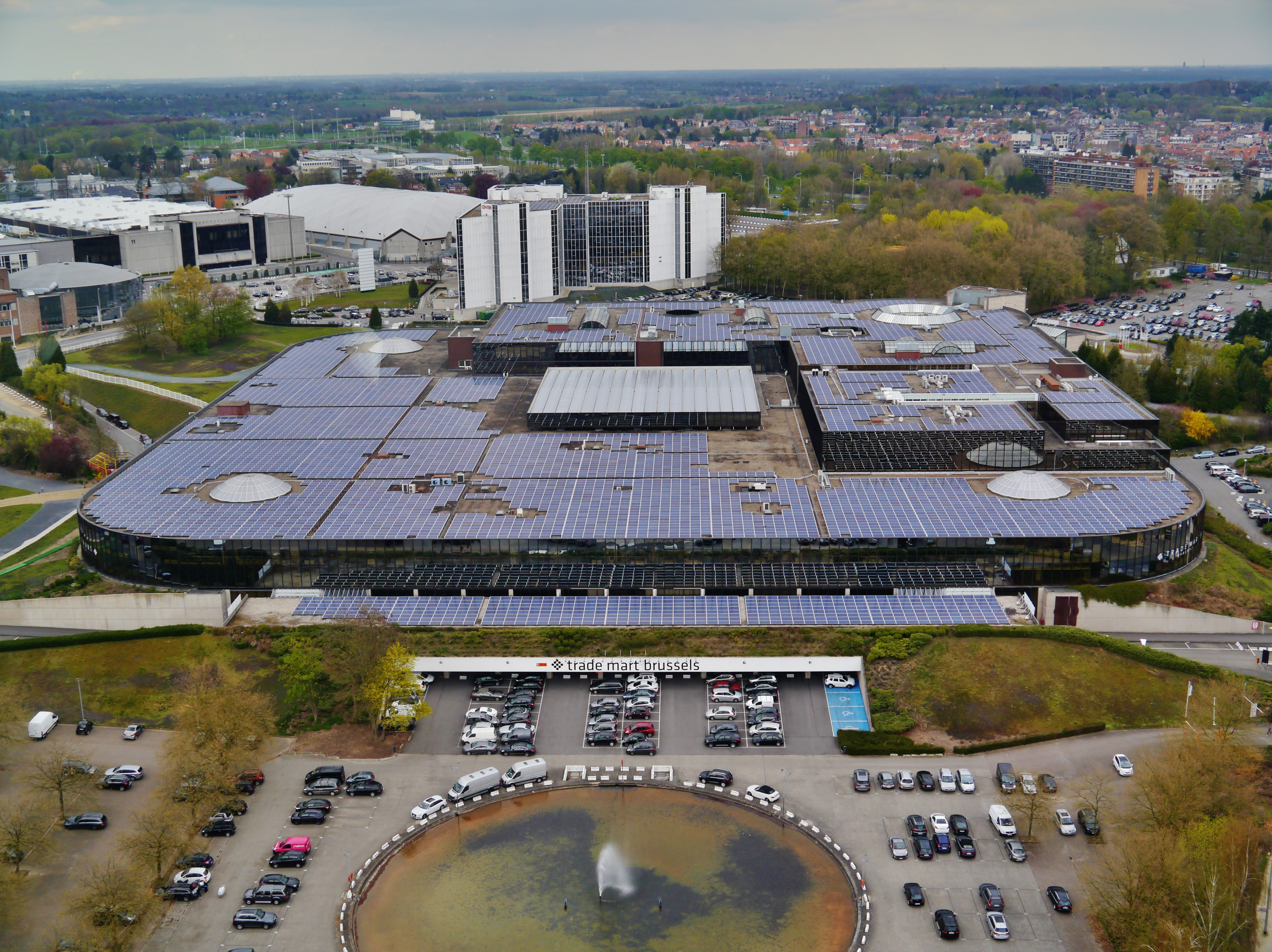
View of Trademart Brussels from the Atomium

Trademart Brussels is a 200,000 m^{2} (2,200,000 sq ft) business-to-business wholesale trade centre in Brussels, Belgium, located on the Heysel/Heizel Plateau, housing showrooms that sell consumer products. The marketplace is closed to the public but open to certified retail buyers and interior designers, manufacturers and industry professionals. It is the largest purchasing centre for retail professionals in Europe.

Trademart houses more than 350 exhibitors and 1,500 brands in fashion, baby and kids, home and living (interior), sports and retail services. It connects demand and supply.

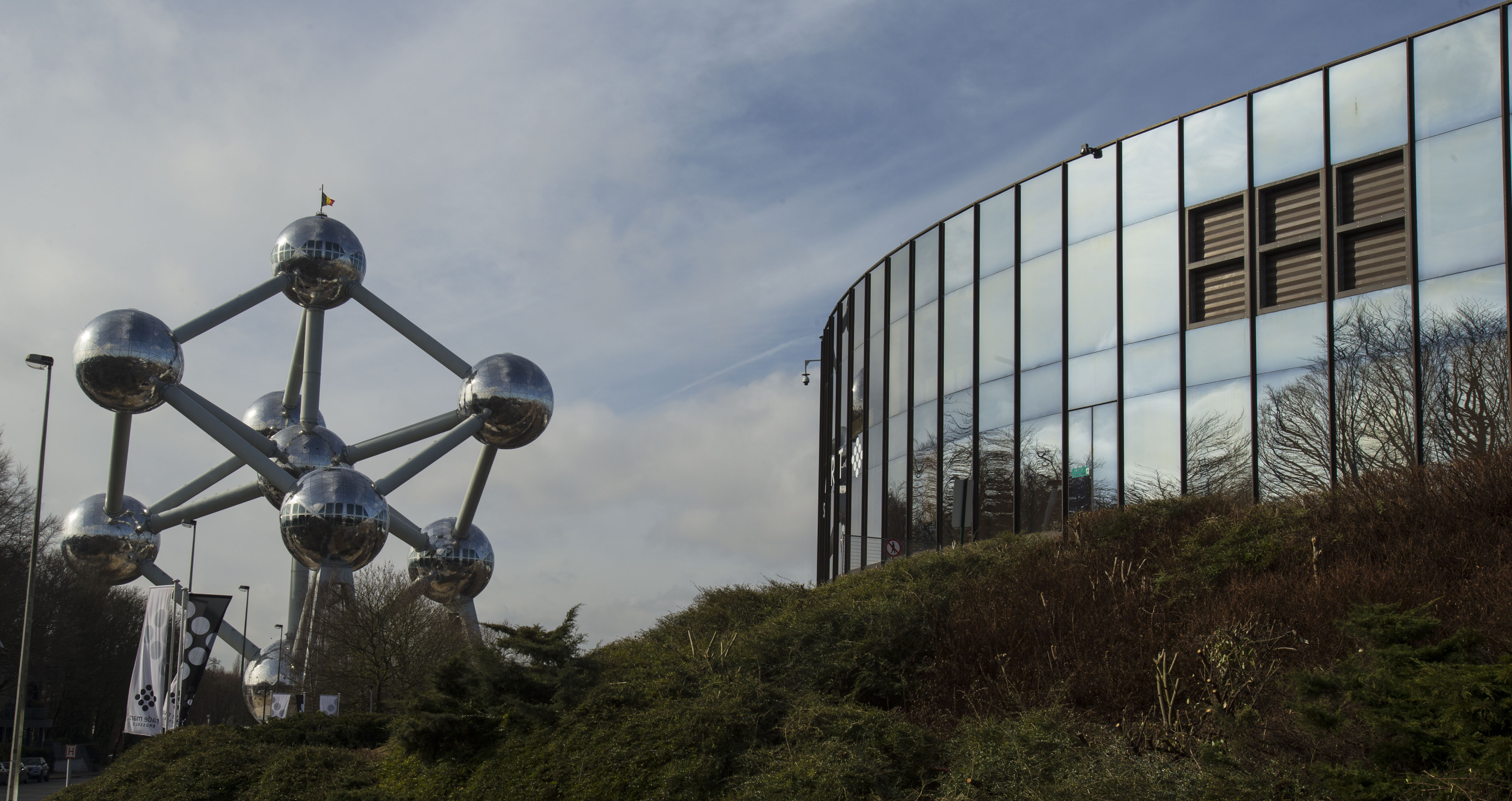
Trademart Brussels next to the Atomium

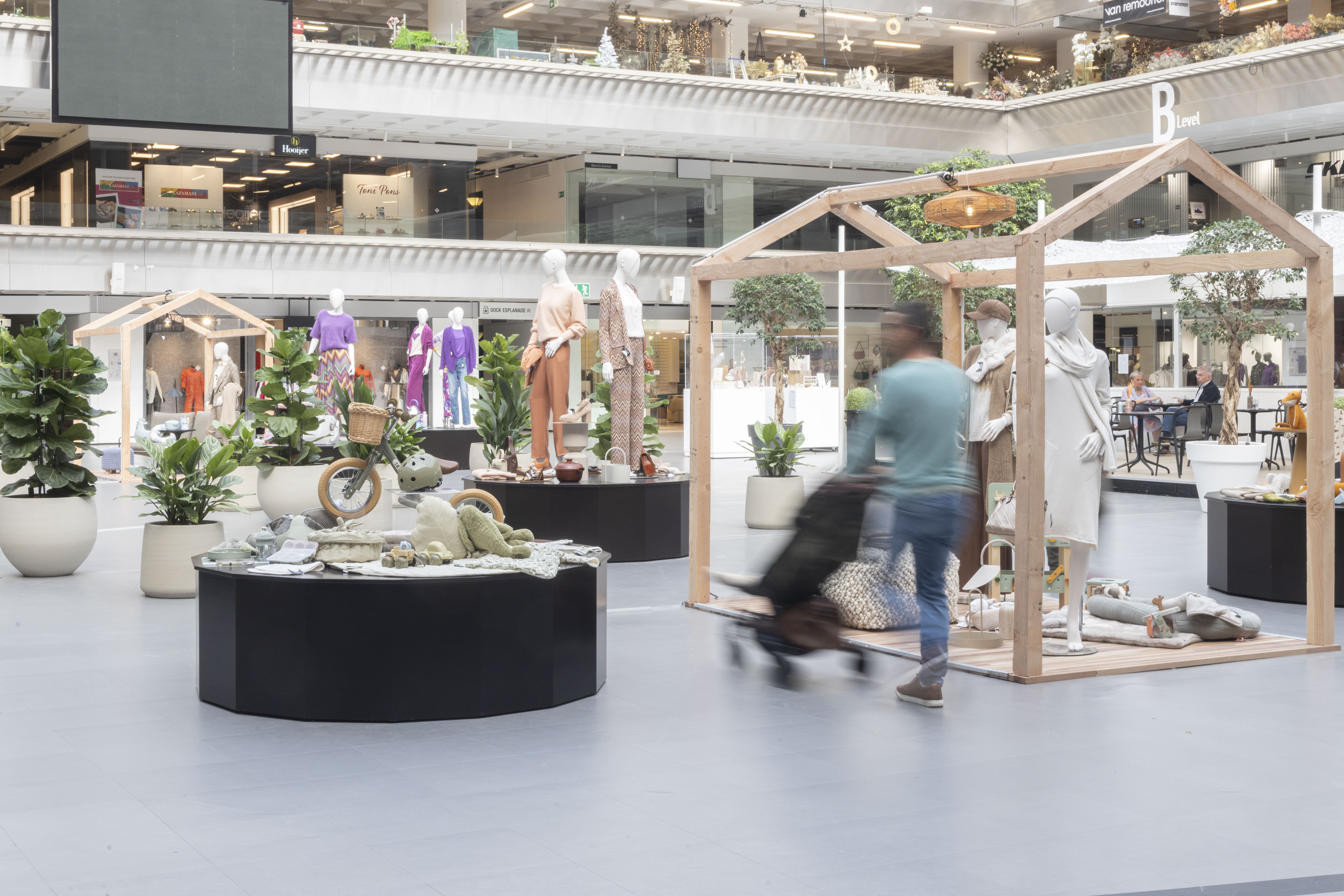
Inside the Trademart building

== See also ==
- Dallas Market Center
