= Infomart =

Equinix Infomart
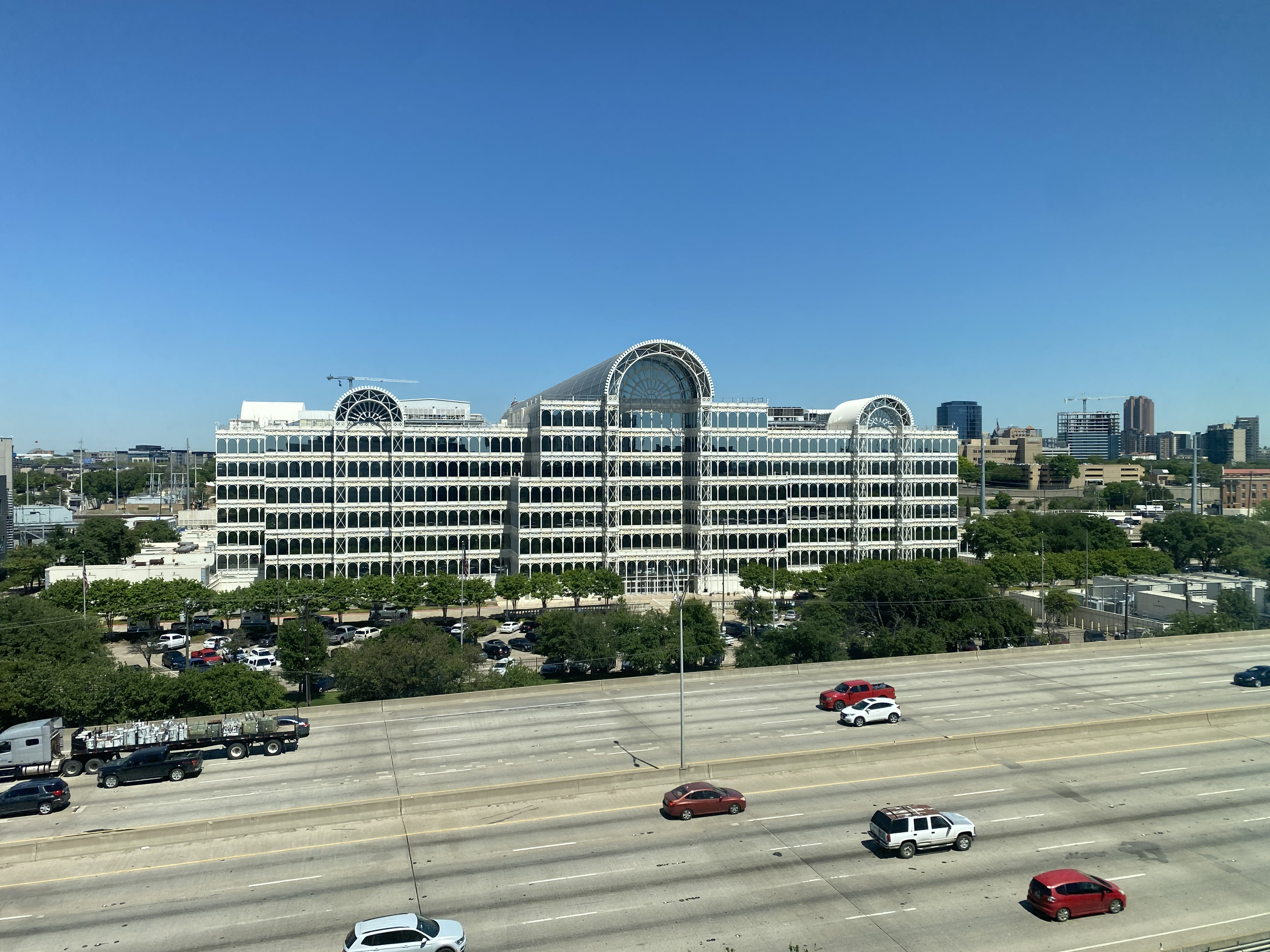
- Interactive map of the Equinix Infomart area

General information
- Status: Completed
- Type: Office
- Location: 1950 N. Stemmons Freeway, Dallas, Texas, United States
- Coordinates: 32°48′03″N 96°49′11″W
- Opening: 1985
- Owner: Equinix

Technical details
- Floor count: 7
- Floor area: 1,583,309 sq ft (147,094.2 m^{2})

Design and construction
- Architect: Martin Growald
- Developer: Trammell Crow

Website
- https://www.equinix.com/data-centers/americas-colocation/united-states-colocation/dallas-data-centers

The Equinix Infomart is one of the largest buildings in Dallas, Texas (USA). It houses mainly enterprise companies and data center providers. The building is supplied by five independent electric feeds to three separate electrical substations. It is also one of the most digitally connected buildings in the world, with over 8,700 strands of fiber optic cabling.

It is located at 1950 N. Stemmons Freeway in the Market Center neighborhood between Oak Lawn and Interstate 35E, and served by DART's Market Center Station.

== History ==
The $85 million Infomart was opened as part of Trammell Crow's Dallas Market Center in 1985 on the site of the P.C. Cobb Stadium. It was built to serve the needs of information technology companies and provide an environment that would stimulate growth. After several years as a permanent trade show for information technology vendors, the building was sold in 1999 and 2006.

The building was purchased by ASB Real Estate Investments and currently serves as a technology office and data center, home to more than 110 technology and telecommunications companies. The property and management team were recently merged with another Data Center operator, Fortune Data Centers, to create a national operator. The combined entity will operate under the name Infomart Data Centers.

In the 1980s and early 1990s, Infomart hosted combined monthly meetings of many Dallas-area computer user groups, including those for the Apple II, Atari 8-bit computers, Atari ST, and Amiga.

In April 2018, ASB sold the Infomart building and their data centers located in the building to Equinix Inc for $800 million. The center became home to four Equinix Dallas International Business Exchange (IBX) data facilities (Equinix DA1, DA2, DA3 and DA6), offering direct peering access to more than 530 Equinix customers, including over 180 enterprises, over 50 financial services and over 160 cloud and IT services. Peering networks include Google Cloud Platform, Microsoft Azure, Oracle, Voxility, Lumen Technologies (formerly known as Level3 Communications) and Verizon.

In June 2020, Equinix announced the expansion of the Infomart Data Center site with the construction of a new $142 million International Business Exchange (IBX) data center and the establishment of a 5G and Edge Proof of Concept Center (POCC).

As of August 2021, Infomart is listed among the 10th most interconnected data centers in the United States, by data center rankings.

== Design ==
At 1,583,309-square-foot (147,094.2 m^{2}) spread across 7 floors and 18.2 acres (74,000 m^{2}), the Infomart is one of the largest and most distinctive buildings in Dallas. The design was modeled after The Crystal Palace, a huge iron and glass building originally erected in Hyde Park in 19th century Britain to house the Great Exhibition of 1851.

The Infomart used to have a reproduction of the Crystal Fountain created by the same company, Barovier & Toso. The Infomart was built with steel frame curtain wall construction. The building's hospital-grade electrical power is supplied by five independent electric feeds to three separate electrical substations, providing a very reliable source that has never experienced a 100% outage. More than 135 network providers have a physical presence at the Infomart, with over 8,700 strands of fiber coming into the building.

== Tenants ==
A number of tenants are housed in the building with a mix of enterprises companies and data center providers. If an enterprise moves out, the space is absorbed by data center providers expanding in the building. Data Center providers include Equinix, DataBank, Cologix, and Flexential. Wade College is also in the building.
