= Market Center (Baltimore, Maryland) =

- U.S. National Register of Historic Places
- U.S. Historic district
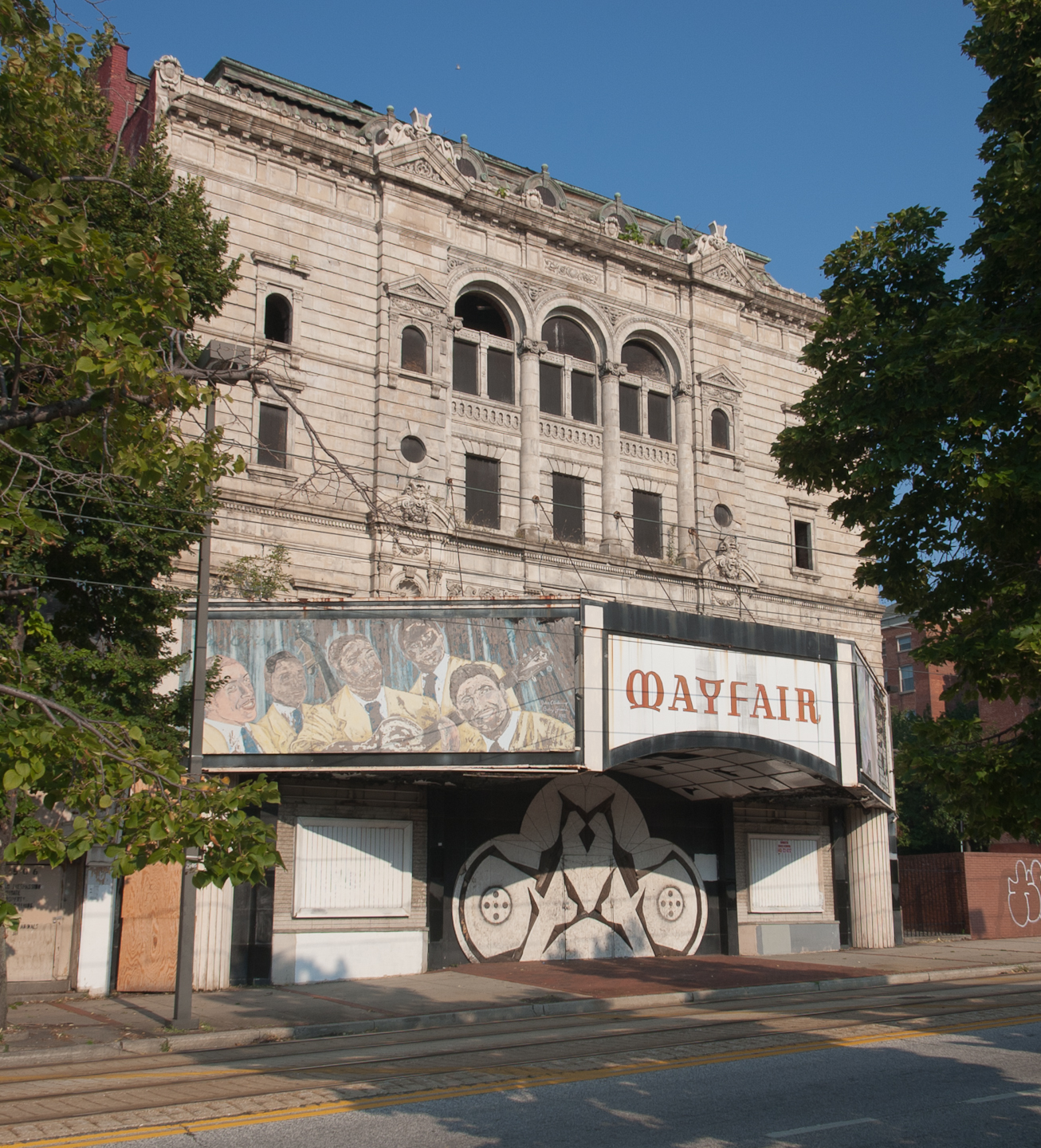
- Mayfair Theater on Howard Street, August 2011

- Location within Baltimore Location within Maryland Location within the United States
- Location: 24 blocks surrounding the jct. of Howard and Lexington Sts., Baltimore, Maryland
- Coordinates: 39°17′33″N 76°37′15″W
- Area: 114 acres (46 ha)
- Architectural style: Early Republic, Mid 19th Century Revival
- NRHP reference No.: 00000040 (original); 100009235 (increase)

Significant dates
- Added to NRHP: February 4, 2000
- Boundary increase: August 21, 2023

Market Center is a national historic district in Baltimore, Maryland, United States. It is an approximately 24-block area in downtown Baltimore that includes buildings associated with the development of the area as Baltimore's historic retail district. The area evolved from an early 19th-century neighborhood of urban rowhouses to a premiere shopping district featuring large department stores, grand theaters, and major chain stores. The diverse size, style, scale, and types of structures within the district reflect its residential origins and evolution as a downtown retail center.

It was added to the National Register of Historic Places in 2000, with a boundary increase in 2023.
