= Market Center station =

DART rail station in Dallas, Texas

Market Center
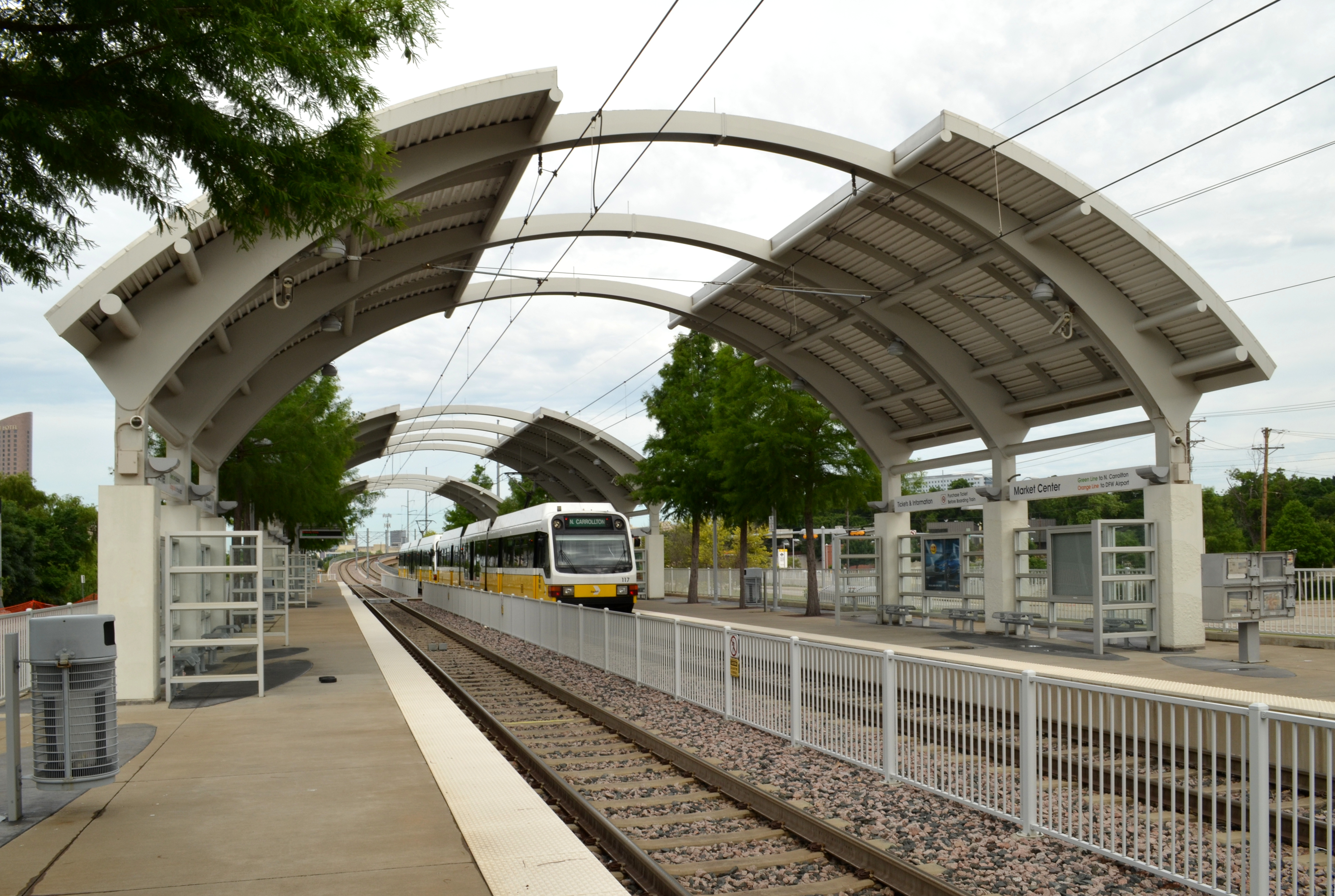
- DART Green Line train at Market Center station

General information
- Location: 4301 Harry Hines Boulevard; Dallas, Texas
- Coordinates: 32°48′17″N 96°49′26″W
- System: DART rail
- Owner: Dallas Area Rapid Transit
- Platforms: 2 side platforms
- Tracks: 2
- Bus stands: 5
- Connections: DART: 306

Construction
- Structure type: At-grade
- Parking: 238 spaces
- Cycle facilities: 2 lockers, 1 rack
- Accessible: Yes

History
- Opened: December 6, 2010

Passengers
- FY 2025: 569 (avg. weekday) ▼0.7%

Services
Preceding station	DART	Following station
Southwestern Medical District/Parkland toward North Carrollton/Frankford	Green Line	Victory toward Buckner
Southwestern Medical District/Parkland toward DFW Airport Terminal A	Orange Line	Victory toward LBJ/Central or Parker Road
Location

Market Center station is a DART rail station in Dallas, Texas. The station serves the Green Line and Orange Line, as well as a weekday express bus to Glenn Heights Park & Ride.

The station is located along Harry Hines Boulevard in western Oak Lawn next to the Dallas Market Center and Infomart complexes. A park-and-ride lot is available on the opposite side of Harry Hines Boulevard, and an elevated pedestrian bridge connects the station to the Market Center.

The station opened as part of the Green Line's expansion in December 2010.
