= Medical/Market Center station =

Commuter rail station in Dallas, Texas

Medical/Market Center
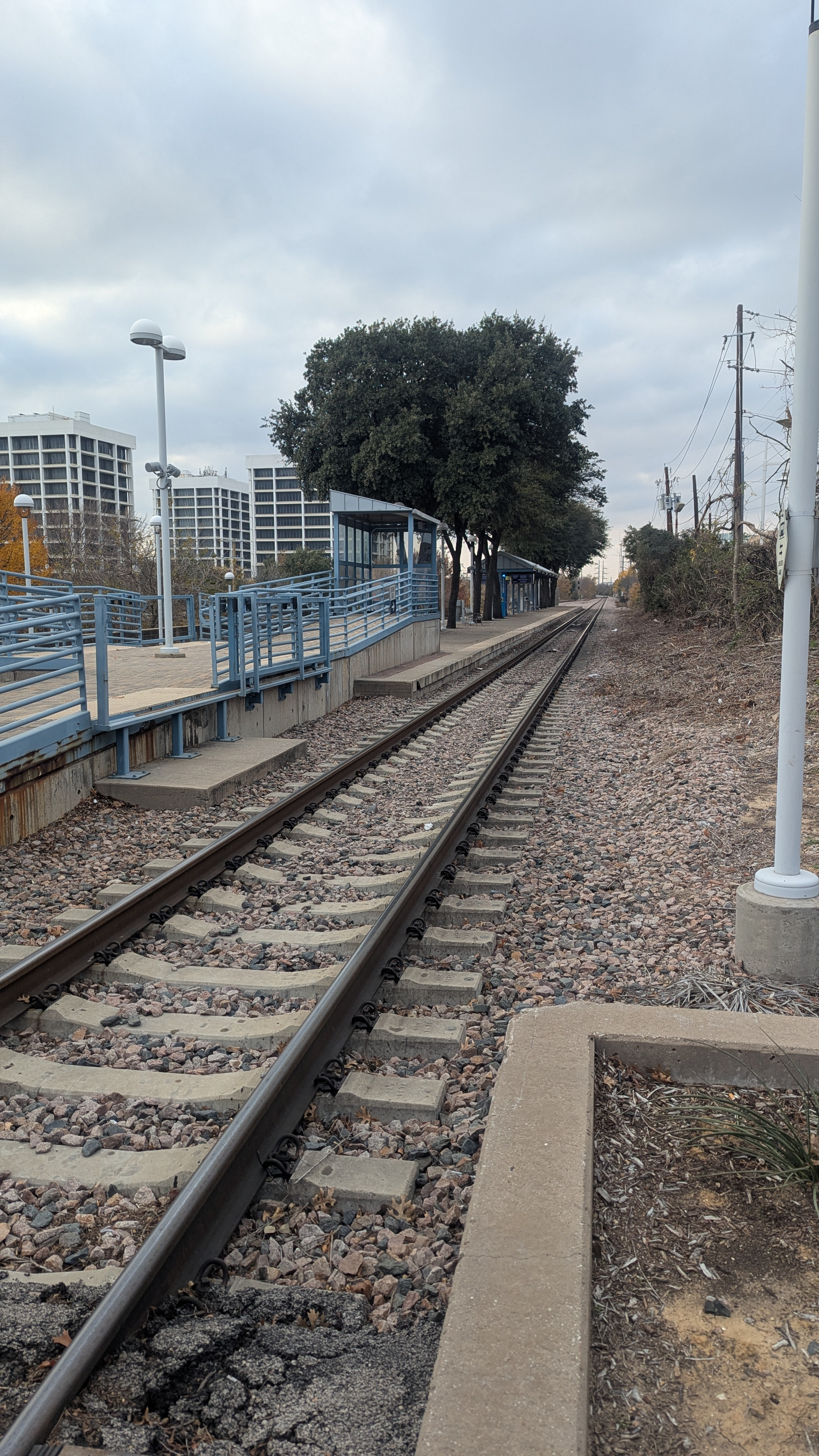
- The Medical-Market Center station in December 2025.

General information
- Location: 5222 Southwestern Medical Avenue; Dallas, Texas
- Coordinates: 32°48′31″N 96°50′21″W
- Owner: Dallas Area Rapid Transit
- Line: Trinity Railway Express
- Platforms: 1 island platform
- Tracks: 2
- Connections: 422-UT Southwestern South (M-F), 423-UT Southwestern North (M-F)

Construction
- Structure type: At-grade
- Cycle facilities: 1 rack
- Accessible: Yes

Other information
- Fare zone: East

History
- Opened: December 30, 1996

Passengers
- FY 2025: 337 (avg. weekday) ▲2.1%

Services
Preceding station	Trinity Railway Express	Following station
Downtown Irving/Heritage Crossing toward T&P Station	Trinity Railway Express	Victory toward Dallas Union Station
Location

Medical/Market Center station is a Trinity Railway Express commuter rail station in Dallas, Texas. The station is located in the Southwestern Medical District near the intersection of Interstate 35E and Medical District Drive. The station serves the Dallas Market Center and the facilities in the Medical District, including Parkland Memorial Hospital, Children's Medical Center Dallas, and the University of Texas Southwestern Medical Center.

As of the 2025 fiscal year, the station has the lowest Saturday ridership of all TRE stations, with an average of 103 riders.

The station opened on December 30, 1996.

== See also ==
- Southwestern Medical District/Parkland station, a DART Rail station serving the Southwestern Medical District
