= Design District, Dallas =

Neighborhood in Dallas, Texas

Coordinates: 32.7940°N 96.8219°W

The Design District is a neighborhood in central Dallas, Texas, just northwest of Downtown. It is bordered by I-35E on the north and east, Wycliff Avenue and the Trinity River levee on the west, and Continental Avenue on the south. Formerly a warehouse district, it is now known for its interior design showrooms and art galleries, from which it gets its name. In recent years, it has also become known for its fine dining establishments and upscale apartments.
