= Dallas Market Center =

Wholesale trade center

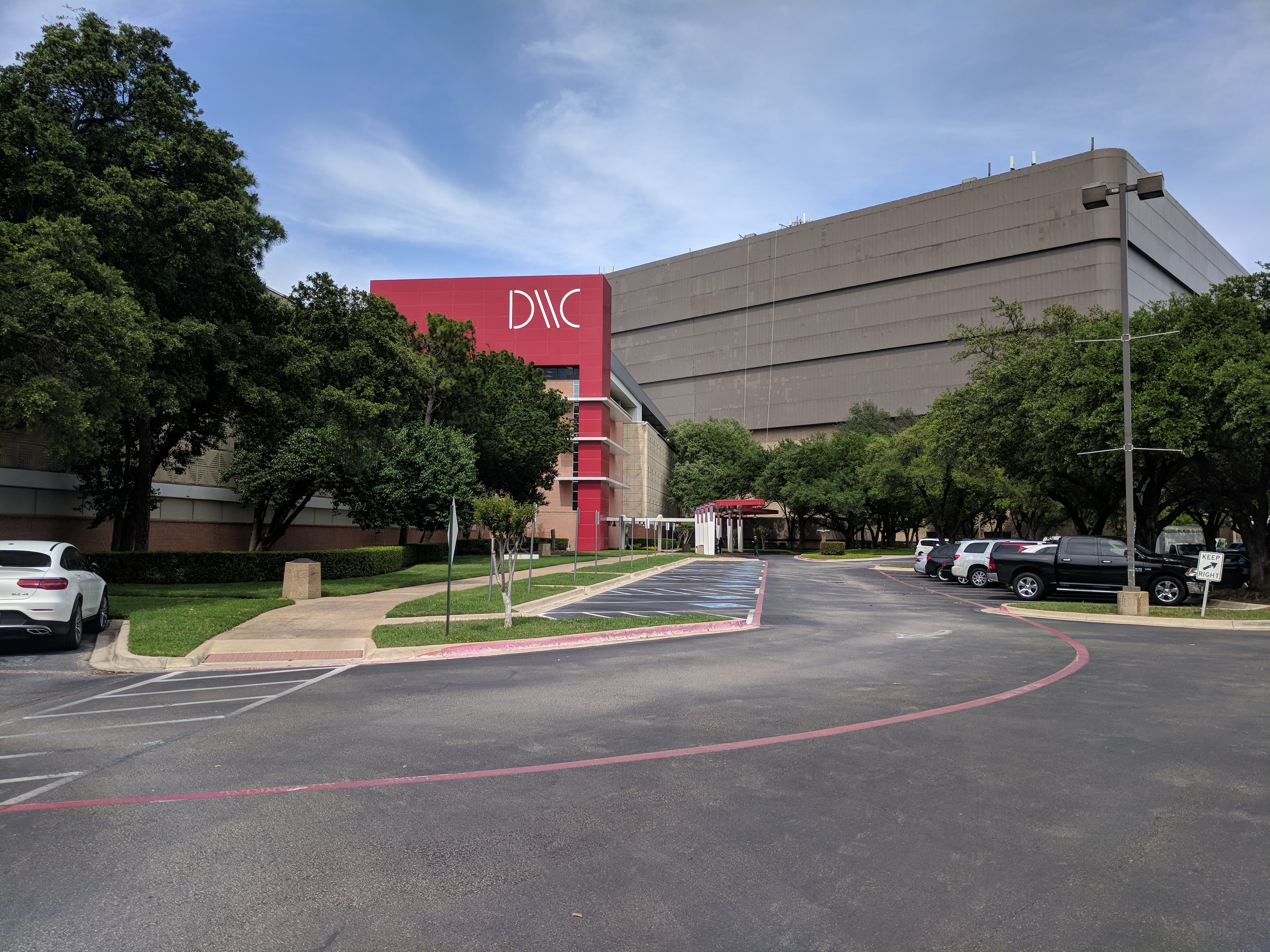
- Dallas Market Center (Trade Mart to the left, World Trade Center to the right)
- Interactive map of Dallas Market Center
- Coordinates: 32.803°N 96.825°W
- Public transit: DART rail, Green and Orange lines (Market Center station)

Construction
- Expanded: 1959 (Trade Mart); 1960 (Market Hall); 1964 (Apparel Mart); 1974 (World Trade Center)

Dallas Market Center is a 5-million-square-foot (460,000 m^{2}) wholesale trade center in Dallas, Texas, United States, located at 2200 Stemmons Freeway, housing showrooms that sell consumer products including gifts, lighting, home décor, apparel, fashion accessories, shoes, tabletop/housewares, gourmet, floral, and holiday products.

The marketplace, which is in essence a B2B shopping mall, is closed to the public but open to certified retail buyers and interior designers, manufacturers, and industry professionals. Large-scale market events are held at the center throughout the year. Dallas Market Center is owned by Dallas-based Crow Holdings and managed by Market Center Management Company (MCMC), a Crow Holdings subsidiary.

The center was the destination of U.S. President John F. Kennedy's motorcade when he was assassinated in Dealey Plaza on November 22, 1963.

Dallas Market Center
- Shopping
- Transit
- Attractions
1 Interior Home + Design Center
2 Trade Mart
3 Market Hall
4 World Trade Center
5 Market Center (DART station)
6 The Eagle (bronze by Elisabeth Frink, 1964)

== The campus ==
The four-building campus includes the World Trade Center, Trade Mart, International Trade Plaza (The Plaza), and Market Hall. Inside these buildings, nearly 2,300 permanent showrooms offer more than 35,000 product lines from manufacturers around the world.

Trammell Crow developed the nearby Dallas Decorative Center, which opened in 1955.

The two-story International Trade Plaza, which opened in 1957, is the first building at the current site of Dallas Market Center. The original name for the building, designed by Donald H. Speck, was the Southwest Homefurnishings Mart, or sometimes called the Dallas Homefurnishings Mart. The 434,000-square-foot (40,300 m^{2}) building was repurposed in 1999 as the International Floral & Gift Center, and then later in 2012 as the International Trade Plaza. The current name is the Interior Home + Design Center, following a renovation in 2017.

The Dallas Trade Mart, the second Dallas Market Center building, was designed by Harold Berry, Donald Speck, and Harwell Hamilton Harris, and it opened its doors in 1958. The project provided 980,000 square feet (91,000 m^{2}) of showroom space and cost US$12.64 million (equivalent to $141 million in 2025). It is four stories tall, and the atrium at its center is named the Grand Pavilion.

Market Hall, which opened in 1960, sits across Market Center Boulevard from the rest of the campus. It is the only building open to the public, with more than 60 shows per year. It has 202,000 square feet (18,800 m^{2}) of floor space.

In 1964, the Apparel Mart opened for business at a cost of US$15 million (equivalent to $156 million in 2025) with 1.6 million square feet (150,000 m^{2}) of space. For four decades, the building served as a trading center for women's, men's, and children's apparel and accessories. It closed in 2004, and the 600 tenants were moved to the World Trade Center.

The largest building and centerpiece of the campus is the World Trade Center, opened in 1974 with seven stories. It was expanded in 1979 to have 3.1 million square feet (290,000 m^{2}) of floor space and 15 stories. Inside the World Trade Center are showrooms including gifts, home accessories, lighting, floral, holiday, jewelry, rugs, toys, gourmet foods, furniture, and linens.

Today, apparel and accessories showrooms reside on the top floors of the World Trade Center, and apparel trade events held at Dallas Market Center attract buyers from around the world.

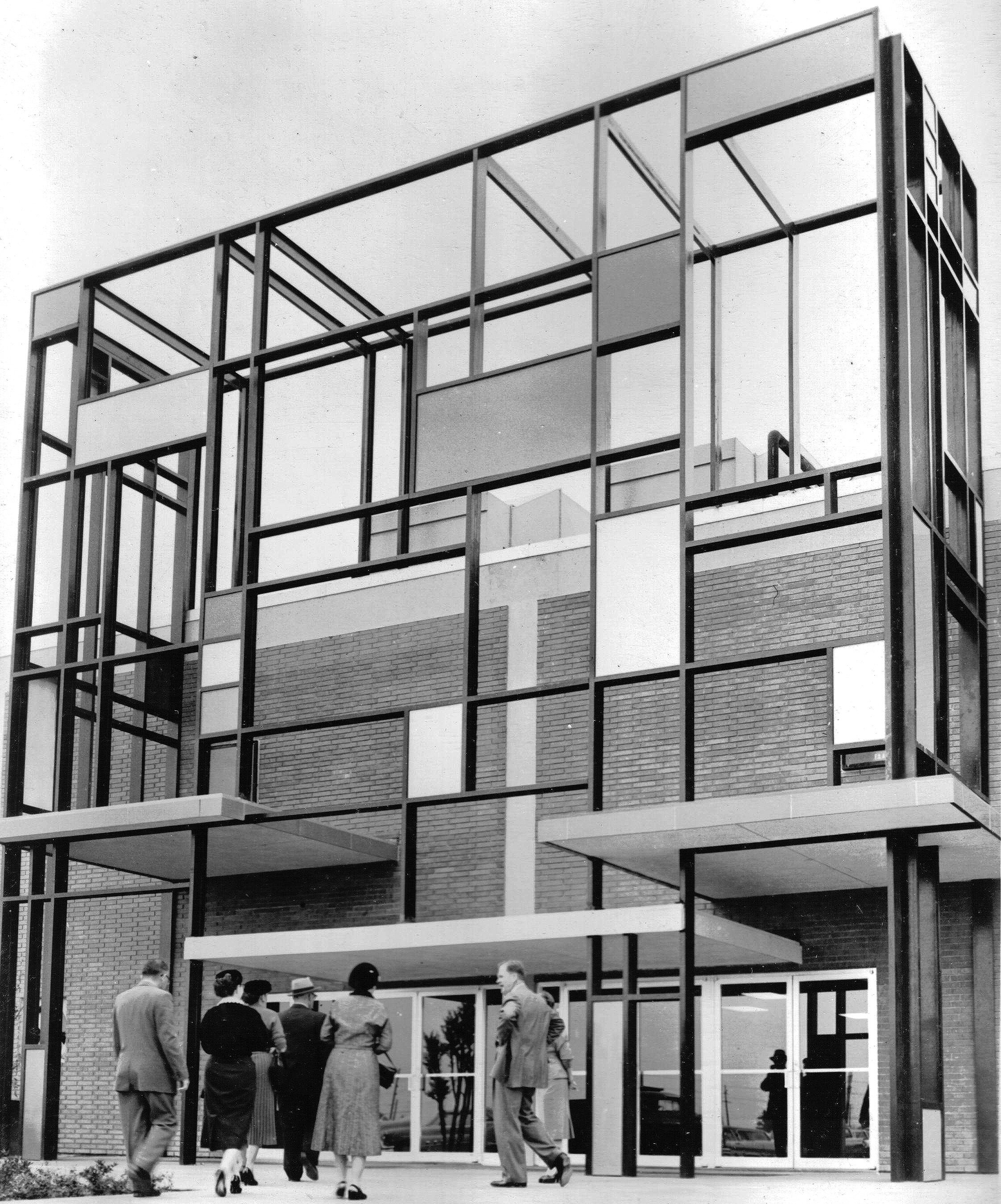
Southwest Homefurnishings Mart c.1957

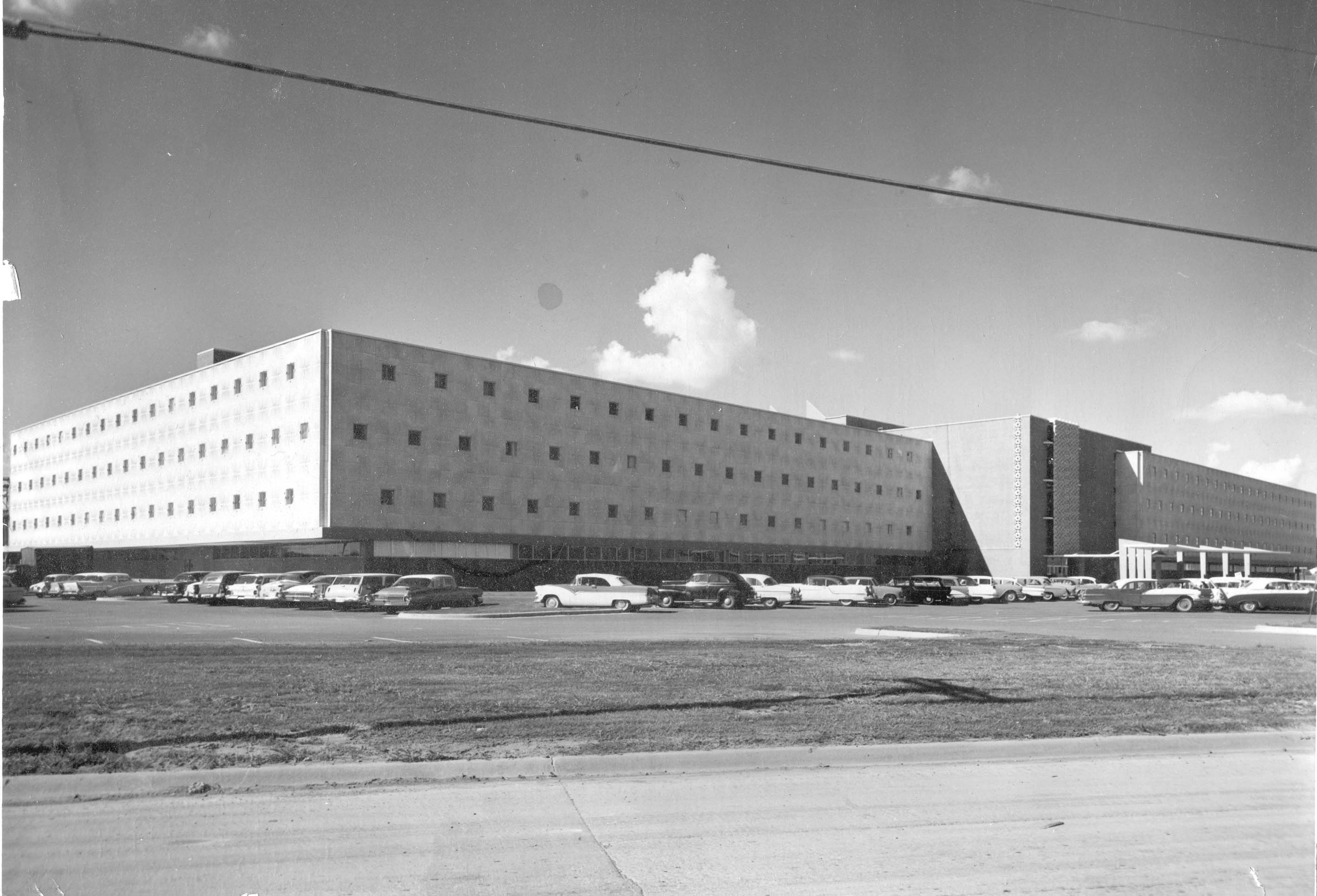
Dallas Trade Mart c.1958

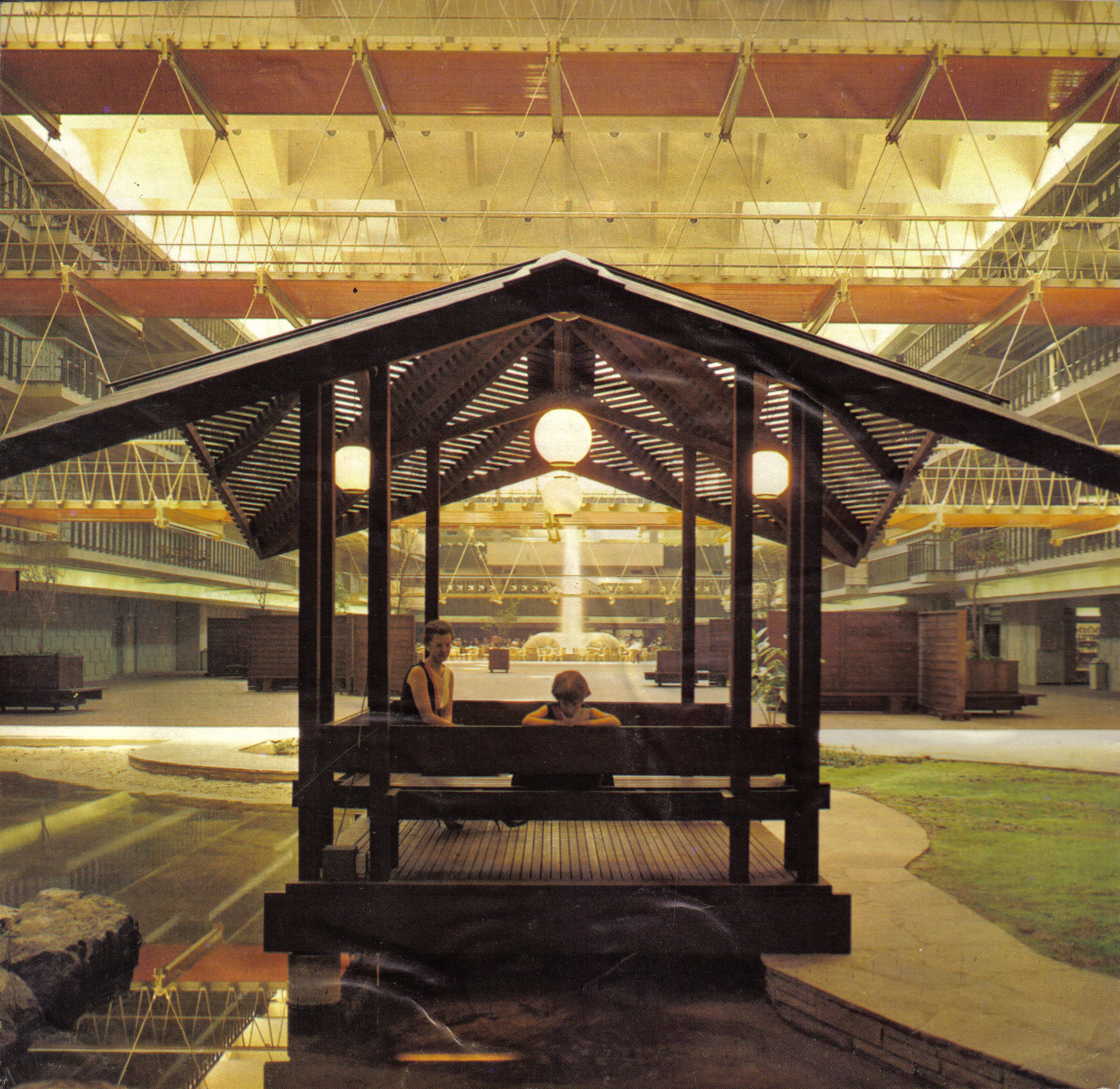
Pergola in the Dallas Trade Mart Grand Courtyard c.1958

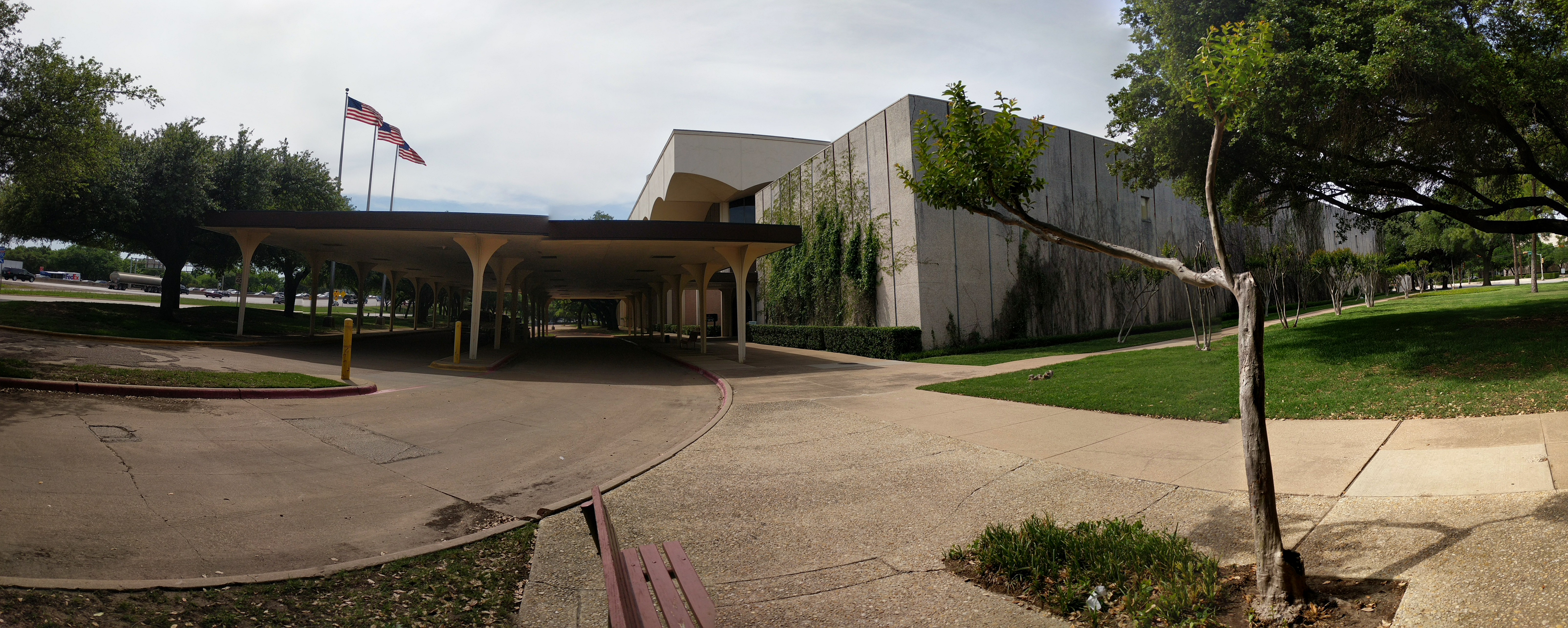
Market Hall (2018)

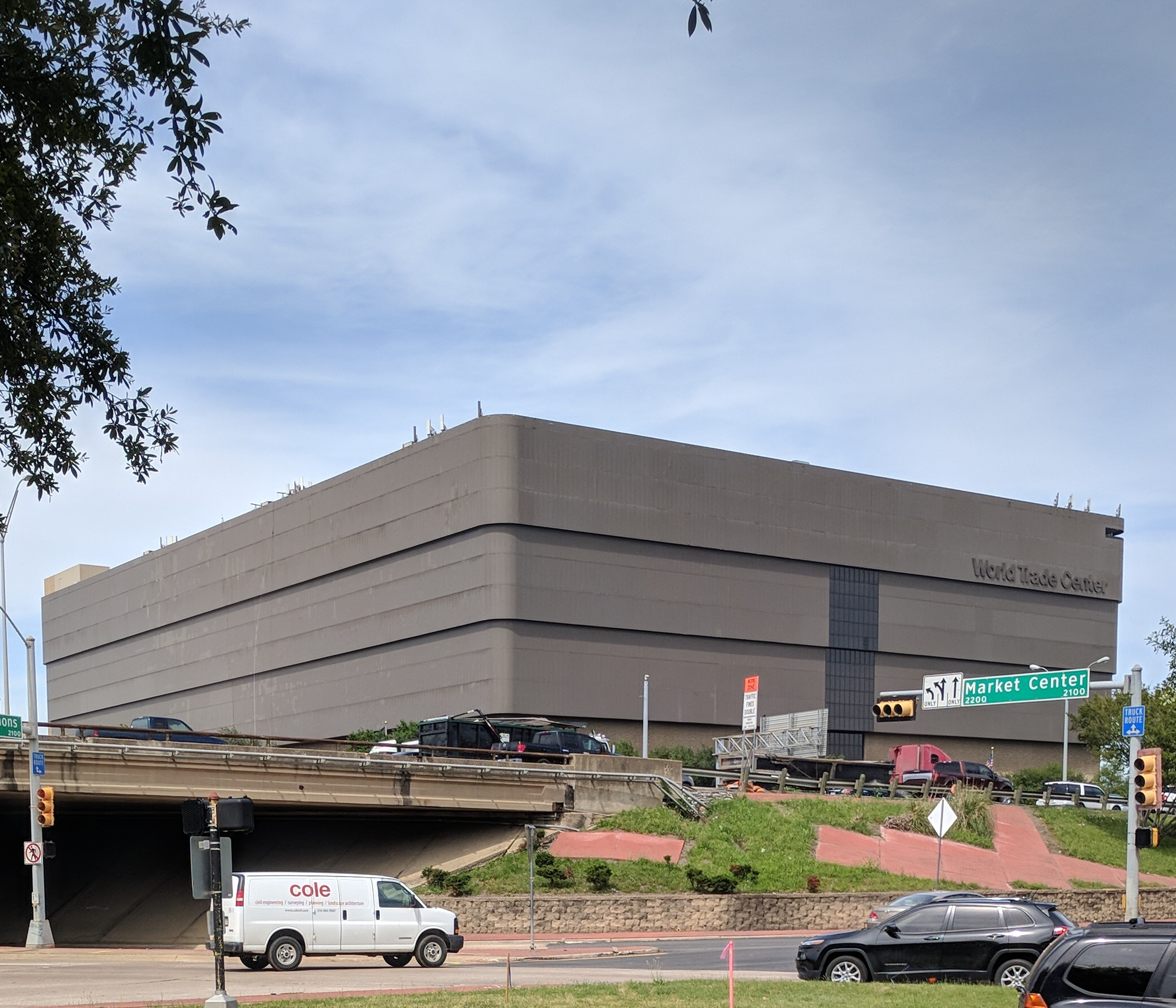
Dallas World Trade Center (2018)

== History ==
In 1957, real estate developer Trammell Crow founded Dallas Market Center.

The first trade event at Dallas Market Center was held in July 1957 and was attended by 1,850 visitors. By the 2020s, the largest events were attracting more than 50,000 attendees from 50 states and 85 countries.

On November 22, 1963, the Trade Mart was the destination of U.S. President John F. Kennedy's motorcade when he was assassinated in Dealey Plaza. He had been scheduled to give a speech to 2,600 people at a sold-out luncheon in the Grand Courtyard. Notable guests awaiting Kennedy's arrival included: Market Center partners Trammell Crow and John Stemmons; J. Erik Jonsson, one of the owners of Texas Instruments; and Dallas Mayor Earle Cabell. Since the event fell on a Friday, special dispensation had been arranged to allow the Catholics in attendance to eat meat (the planned main course was steak) at the luncheon.

On October 12, 1964, English sculptor Elisabeth Frink created the bronze sculpture The Eagle, on display outside the main entrance today. It features a William Blake quote and a plaque which reads:

Placed in memorial by the friends of United States President John Fitzgerald Kennedy who awaited his arrival at the Dallas Trade Mart on November 22, 1963 when he was assassinated in Dealey Plaza.

By the late 1980s, Dallas Market Center had expanded to six buildings offering 6.9 million square feet (640,000 m^{2}) of space, housing 3,200 tenants with 60,000 employed workers.

== Trade events and markets ==
Dallas Market Center hosts dozens of trade events throughout the year, including 50 markets attracting some 200,000 retail buyers.

The Accessories Resource Team (ART), the trade association for home decorative accessories, partners with Dallas Market Center to sponsor the annual ARTS Awards gala, which recognizes excellence and achievement in retailing, manufacturing, design, and representation.

In the 2010s, the Toy Industry Association held its Fall Toy Previews at Dallas Market Center. This show for mass market retailers was the industry's most important preview of toy products under development for the following year.

== In popular media ==
Portions of the blockbuster science fiction film Logan's Run (1976) were filmed in the Apparel Mart and World Trade Center buildings.

Portions of the cult classic slasher film The Initiation (1984) were filmed in the World Trade Center building.

== See also ==
- Infomart
- Trademart Brussels

== Bibliography ==
- Kennedy, John F. (November 22, 1963). "Remarks Prepared for Delivery at the Trade Mart in Dallas, Texas". John F. Kennedy Presidential Library and Museum.
- Oliver, Glen (January 14, 2007). "A Logan's Run Landmark Sees Last Day". Ain't It Cool News.
