= D2 Subway =

Proposed light rail expansion in Dallas, Texas, US

Overview
- Status: Indefinitely delayed
- Owner: DART
- Locale: Downtown Dallas
- Termini: Victory station; Cityplace/Uptown station
- Stations: 4
- Website: DART D2 Subway (archived 2022)

Service
- Type: Light rail
- System: Dallas Area Rapid Transit
- Operator(s): DART

Technical
- Line length: 2.4 miles (3.9 km)
- Character: At-grade & underground
- Track gauge: 4 ft 8 1/2 in (1,435 mm) standard gauge

D2 Subway was a proposed 2.4 miles (3.9 km) expansion of the DART rail system in metropolitan Dallas, Texas, in the United States. The subway would run from the existing Victory station, tunneling underground through the city center of downtown Dallas, and connect to the existing tunnel under Cityplace. Four new stations would be built along the new alignment.

The Blue Line and Orange Line would have routed through the D2 Subway alignment, thereby alleviating pressure along DART's Pacific Avenue and Bryan Avenue corridor, which all four lines currently share, and promoting system-wide growth in total capacity.

The project was estimated to cost between $1.7 and $1.9 billion. In 2023, DART removed the D2 Subway from its long-term financial plan, effectively indefinitely delaying the project.

== History ==
Proposals for a second downtown light rail alignment date back to DART's 1983 Service Plan to accommodate the interlining of multiple future corridors in the DART Service Area. This plan laid the groundwork for a goal of three potential corridors with a goal that the initial development focus on an east to west subway rather than an at-grade transit-way mall if funding allowed. However, after a failed bond vote in June 1988, DART's System Plan was modified through the 1989 DART New Directions Transit System Plan leading to the development of an, at-grade, surface transit-way along Pacific Avenue and Bryan Avenues, which is currently utilized.

Planning by DART specifically for the D2 Subway alignment was officially initiated in 2007.

Initial plans for the alignment called for the subway to surface near Deep Ellum station, which would have required demolishing the current station. In 2021, DART reconfigured the project's eastern approach to continue into the existing Cityplace/Uptown station tunnel, foregoing the planned surface junction near Deep Ellum. In February 2022, the Dallas City Council and DART Board of Directors each approved this new alignment.

In 2023, the project was removed from DART's twenty-year financial plan, citing high project costs, shifting priorities, and low post-pandemic ridership.

== Description ==
=== Route ===
The project would begin south of Victory Station, diverting via a junction from the existing Green and Orange Line alignment, and traveling at-grade in a southeasterly direction within DART-owned right-of-way in the center of Museum Way crossing Victory Avenue, Victory Park Lane, and Houston Street. The alignment would continue through a parking lot directly south of the Northend Apartments and used by patrons and visitors of the Perot Museum of Nature and Science where the at-grade, Museum Way station, would be located.

Upon leaving the station, the alignment would cross under Spur 366/Woodall Rodgers Freeway and after crossing McKinney Avenue, located on the other side of the highway, the alignment would begin its transition underground through the "west tunnel portal", passing under Hord Street near the Dallas World Aquarium and remaining underground for its duration. The alignment continues south under Griffin Street and between San Jacinto Avenue and Elm Street, an underground station, Metro Center station, would be located providing access for transfers to buses at DART's West Transfer Center or access to the Red and Blue Lines at West End and Akard stations.

After crossing under Main Street, the alignment would turn east under the Belo Garden and continue under Commerce Street. While under Commerce Street, a second underground station, Commerce Street station, would be located between Akard Street and Ervay Street.

Before passing under South Pearl Street, the alignment would begin to turn northeast, crossing diagonally underneath existing buildings and structures. A third underground station, CBD East station, located between Main Street and Elm Street would provide access for transfers to additional buses at DART's East Transfer Center.

The alignment would continue traveling in a northeasterly direction before surfacing near the portal of the existing light rail tunnel under Cityplace.

=== Station listing ===
The project would include four new DART stations: one at-grade, and three underground which would consist of center platforms and introduce fare barriers. From west to east, the stations are:

- Museum Way, located southwest of the Perot Museum and north of Woodall Rodgers Freeway. The station would consist of side platforms.
- Metro Center, located under North Griffin Street between San Jacinto and Elm Streets and would contain a mezzanine level, a public concourse level, and a center platform level accessible from up to four street-level entrances. A headhouse located at DART's West Transfer Center would be the primary entrance for passengers.
- Commerce, located under Commerce Street near AT&T’s headquarters, and the Magnolia and Adolphus hotels. The primary entrance for the station would consist of a station building at Pegasus Plaza located at the southeast corner of Main Street and Akard Street as well as access from two additional street-level entrances.
- CBD East, located between Main and Elm streets just east of South Pearl Street. The primary entrance for the station would be a headhouse at Elm Street and South Pearl Street as well as access from an additional street-level entrance.

=== Service patterns ===
The project would shift Blue and Orange Line service from the existing Pacific Avenue and Bryan Avenue transit mall to the D2 Subway corridor, with the Orange Line maintaining its current terminals. The Red and Green Lines would continue to operate on the existing transit mall. Additionally, the western segments of the Blue and Green Lines would swap alignments, with the Green Line terminating at UNT Dallas and the Blue Line running to North Carrollton/Frankford. The system would continue to operate at 15-minute peak headways and 20-minute off-peak headways and with the same span of service from approximately 3:30 AM to 1:30 AM. Based on core capacity needs, additional Red Line service would be added during peak hours from Cedars station to Parker Road station to address crowding. Services would continue to operate with two- or three-car length trains and not require an additional increases in fleet size beyond the current 163 Kinki Sharyo SLRV cars.

Trains on the corridor would average 16 miles per hour (26 km/h), with a maximum speed of 22 miles per hour (35 km/h) between Museum Way station and Metro Center station with 30 second average dwell times.
