= West Transfer Center =

Bus station in Downtown Dallas, Texas, United States

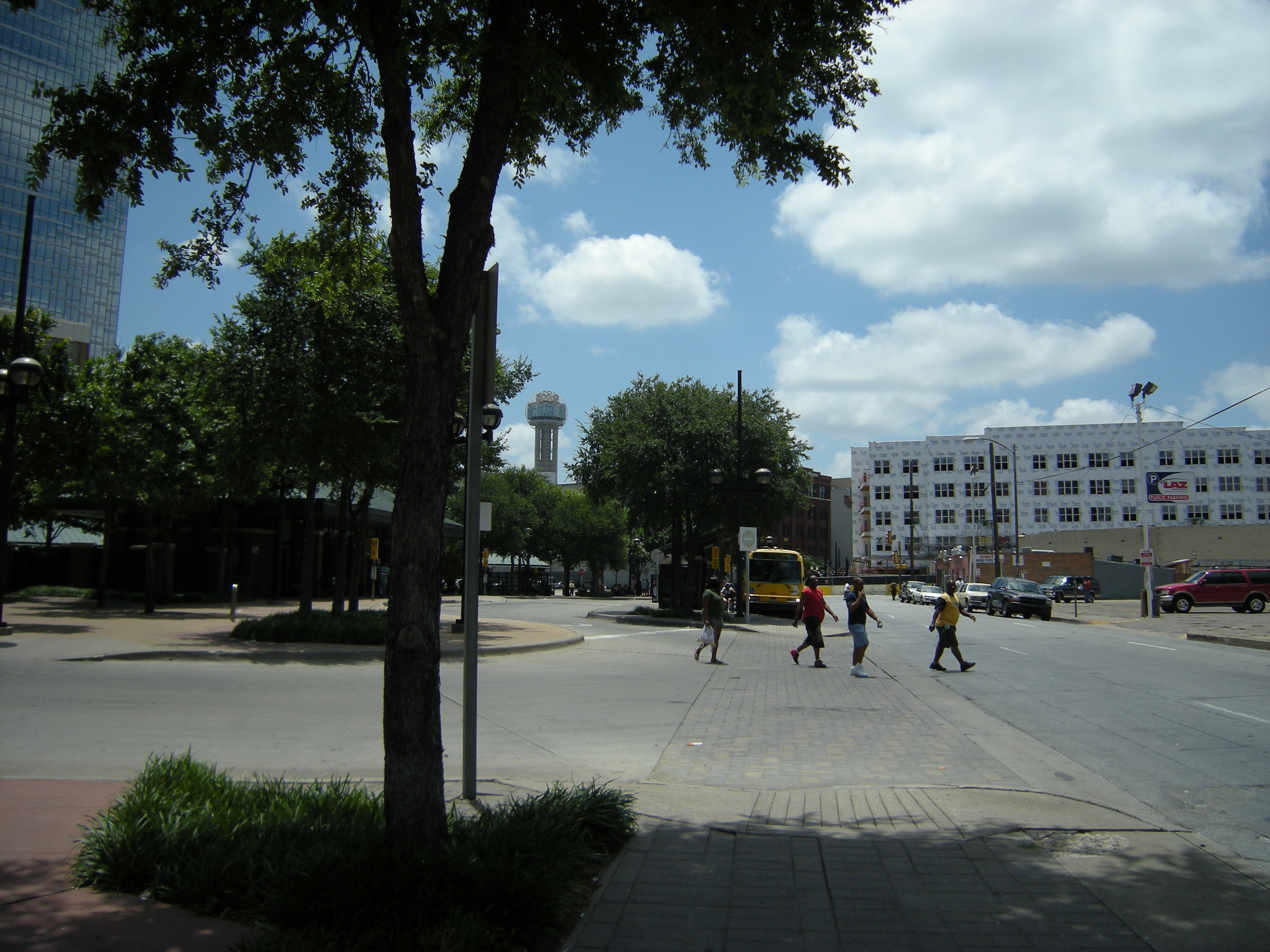

General information
- Location: 920 San Jacinto Street; Dallas, Texas
- Coordinates: 32°46′54″N 96°48′14″W
- Owner: Dallas Area Rapid Transit
- Bus routes: West Transfer Center: 3, 13, 16, 18, 103, 205, 207, 237, 239, 249; Rosa Parks Plaza: 3, 9, 13, 16, 18, 102, 103, 106, 109, 128, 145, 147, 205, 214, 224, 230, 237, 249
- Bus stands: 17
- Connections: and West Dallas Shuttle at adjacent West End station

Construction
- Cycle facilities: 1 rack
- Accessible: Yes

History
- Opened: June 1996
Location

West Transfer Center and Rosa Parks Plaza (also known as Central Business District West or CBD West) is a bus-only station in Downtown Dallas, Texas, United States, operated by the Dallas Area Rapid Transit (DART) system. Located at the intersection of Pacific Avenue, Lamar Street, and San Jacinto Street, the station serves the West End Historic District, including Dealey Plaza, the Sixth Floor Museum, the Dallas World Aquarium, Old Red Courthouse, and Dallas College El Centro Campus.

The station consists of two facilities on opposite sides of Pacific Avenue. West Transfer Center, located north of Pacific, contains thirteen bus stands in a circular loop, with an indoor waiting area, restrooms, and service desk at the center. Rosa Parks Plaza, located south of Pacific, is an outdoor plaza containing two bus stands and a streetside bus stop. The bus stands serve northbound buses on Lamar Street, (Note: Southbound buses on Lamar stop north of Pacific on the west side of the street.) while the streetside stop serves westbound buses on Elm Street. (Note: Eastbound buses stop two blocks south at Commerce Street.)

The transfer center serves 20 bus routes, the most of any DART transfer center. It also serves as a transfer point for all four lines in the DART rail system at the adjacent West End station.

== See also ==
- West End station
- East Transfer Center
