= Bill Dewbre =

American businessman (born 1947)

Bill "Wild Bill" Dewbre, also known as "Wild Bill", is an American businessman, songwriter, and owner of Wild Bill's Western Store in Downtown Dallas' Historic West End.

He was given the title Ambassador of Dallas for his services to the Dallas/Fort Worth Metroplex.

== Early life ==
Bill Dewbre was born in Texas on November 28, 1947. His family had moved to the Dallas area from Lawton, Oklahoma, where his father, Cleave Dewbre, had tooled cowboy boots.

Bill grew up working for his father as an assistant for their family store in Irving, Texas. He began learning leather craft from his father at age 8 or 9. The family then moved to Dallas in the mid-1950s, living two blocks away from the State Fair of Texas. As a young adult, he remembers playing guitar at Jack Ruby's Carousel Club. After returning from Vietnam in the early 1970s, Dewbre bought his father's shop with plans to grow the family business.

== Business career ==
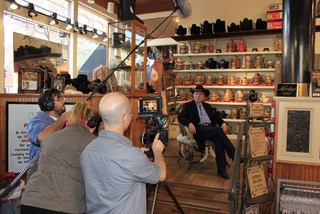
Dewbre being interviewed for a video in Dallas store.

Dewbre is the owner of Wild Bill's Western Store in Dallas, Texas. Its current location, which opened in 2006, is in the West End Historic District of Dallas. The store offers customers customizable western wear like hats and boots with standard and 'exotic' hide options. The store also puts on corporate events for companies like Google and National Geographic.

He is commonly called the unofficial "Ambassador of Dallas." His likeness was also one featured on the walls of the Palm Restaurant in Dallas before its closure. He also served as a consultant for the TNT TV show, Dallas, during both of its runs, creating all the western costumes for the characters. It was during this time he became close friends with Larry Hagman, who played JR Ewing. Dewbre has hosted over 250 celebrities in the store with custom western wear clothing, including the Harlem Globetrotters, Jon Bon Jovi, Bob Schieffer, Kevin Hart, Ice Cube, and Chuck Norris.

Dewbre has also recorded songs as a country music artist. His song, DFW, was released in 2017.
