= John Fitzgerald Kennedy Memorial =

Memorial in Dallas, Texas, US

John Fitzgerald Kennedy Memorial Plaza
- John Fitzgerald Kennedy Memorial in Dallas (2014)
- Interactive map of John Fitzgerald Kennedy Memorial Plaza
- Location: Dallas, Texas
- Coordinates: 32°46′43″N 96°48′23″W
- Designer: Philip Johnson
- Type: Cenotaph
- Material: Concrete and granite
- Length: 50 ft (15 m)
- Width: 50 ft (15 m)
- Height: 30 ft (9.1 m)
- Beginning date: 1969
- Opening date: June 24, 1970
- Restored date: 2000
- Dedicated to: John F. Kennedy
- Website: Official website
- Kennedy Memorial and Plaza
- U.S. Historic district – Contributing property
- U.S. National Historic Landmark District – Contributing property
- Dallas Landmark Historic District; Contributing Property
- Part of: West End Historic District (ID78002918); Dealey Plaza Historic District (ID93001607)
- DLMKHD No.: H/2 (West End HD)

Significant dates
- Designated CP: November 14, 1978
- Designated NHLDCP: October 12, 1993
- Designated DLMKHD: October 6, 1975

The John Fitzgerald Kennedy Memorial is a monument to John Fitzgerald Kennedy, the 35th president of the United States, in the West End Historic District of downtown Dallas, Texas, United States. Erected in 1970, it was designed by Philip Johnson.

Downtown Dallas and John Fitzgerald Kennedy
- Open space
- Presidential limousine
- Key locations
1 Dealey Plaza
2 Texas School Book Depository
3 John Fitzgerald Kennedy Memorial
4 The Grassy Knoll
5 Assassination of John F. Kennedy

== Design ==
The John F. Kennedy Memorial was the first memorial by famed American architect and Kennedy family friend Philip C. Johnson, and was approved by first lady Jacqueline Kennedy. Johnson called it "a place of quiet refuge, an enclosed place of thought and contemplation separated from the city around, but near the sky and earth." Dallas raised $200,000 for the memorial by August 1964, entirely from 50,000 individual donations contributed by private citizens.

=== Plaza ===
The simple concrete memorial lies in the block bounded by Main, Record, Commerce, and Market streets, approximately 200 yards (180 m) east of Dealey Plaza, where Kennedy was assassinated. The block, also known as the John Fitzgerald Kennedy Memorial Plaza, is in downtown Dallas near the Historic West End district, and is owned by Dallas County.

=== Cenotaph ===
Philip Johnson's design is a cenotaph, or empty tomb, that symbolizes the freedom of Kennedy's spirit. The memorial is a square, roofless room, 30 feet (9.1 m) tall and 50 by 50 feet (15 by 15 m) square with two narrow openings facing north and south. The walls consist of 72 white precast concrete columns, most of which end 29 inches (740 mm) above the earth. Eight columns (two in each corner) extend to the ground, acting as legs that support the monument. Each column ends in a light fixture. At night, the lights create the illusion that the structure is supported by the light itself. The corners and "doors" of this roofless room are decorated with rows of concrete circles, or medallions, each identical and perfectly aligned. These decorations introduce the circular shape into the square architecture of the Kennedy Memorial.

The cenotaph lies atop a low concrete hill, embossed with squares and slightly elevated compared to street level. Inside is a low block of dark granite, 8 feet (2.4 m) square, set into a larger shallow depression. The granite square is decorated on its north and south faces with the name "John Fitzgerald Kennedy" carved in gold letters. It is too empty to be a base, too short to be a table, but too square to be a tomb. The letters have been painted gold to capture the light from the white floating column walls and the pale concrete floor. These words – three words of a famous name – are the only verbal messages in the empty room.

=== Epitaph ===
Two dark granite squares are set in the plaza surrounding the memorial, each approximately 50 feet (15 m) from the narrow entrances to the cenotaph. They are each inscribed with an epitaph that reads:

The joy and excitement of
John Fitzgerald Kennedy's life belonged to all men.

So did the pain and sorrow of his death.

When he died on November 22, 1963, shock and
agony touched human conscience throughout the world.
In Dallas, Texas, there was a special sorrow.

The young President died in Dallas. The death
bullets were fired 200 yards west of this site.

This memorial, designed by Philip Johnson,
was erected by the people of Dallas. Thousands of
citizens contributed support, money and effort.

It is not a memorial to the pain and sorrow
of death, but stands as a permanent tribute to the joy
and excitement of one man's life.

John Fitzgerald Kennedy's life.

— Jim Lehrer, journalist

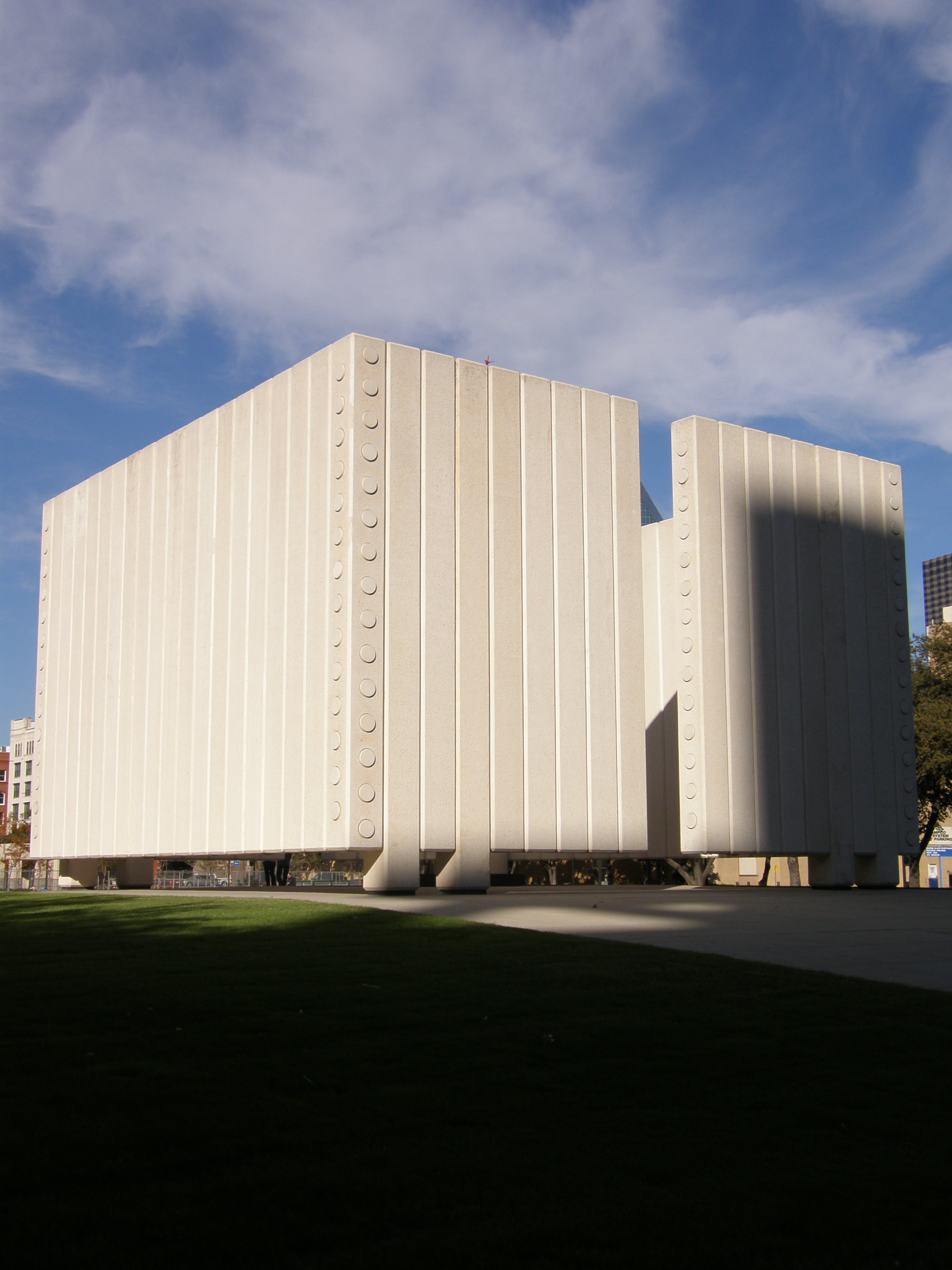
John F. Kennedy Memorial

Narrow openings north and south

Inside the cenotaph

Low granite square

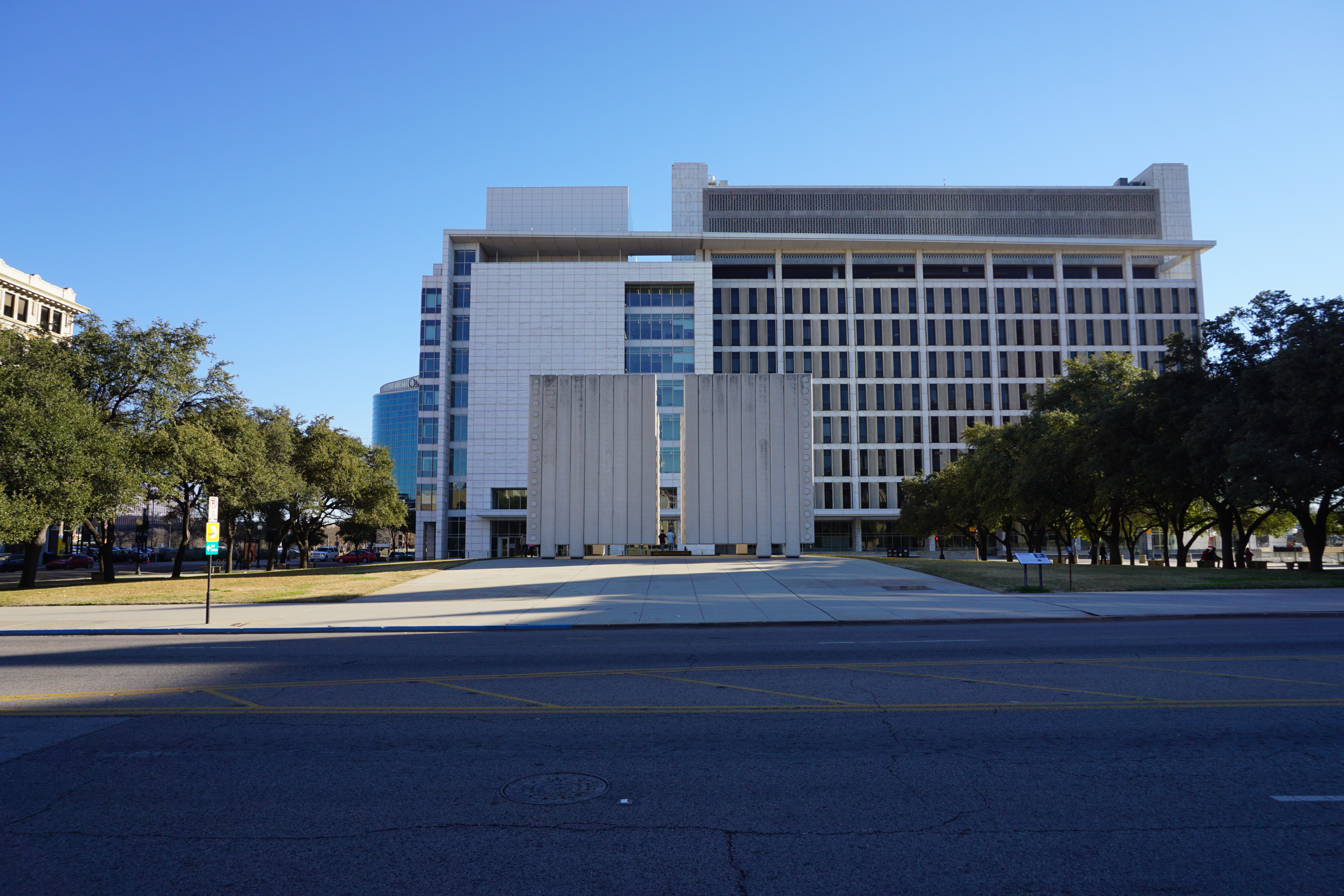
John Fitzgerald Kennedy Memorial Plaza in January 2016

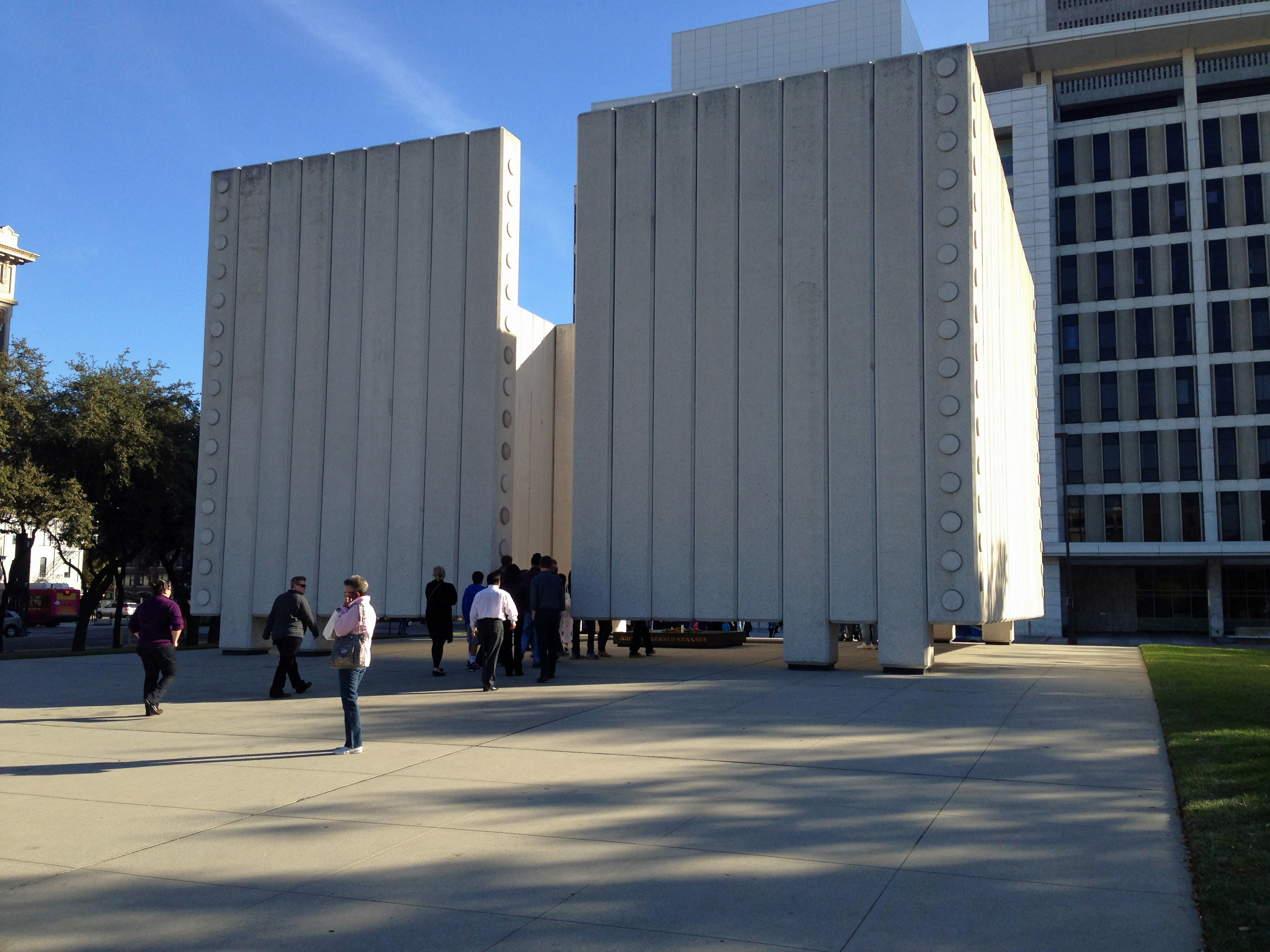
With visitors, for scale

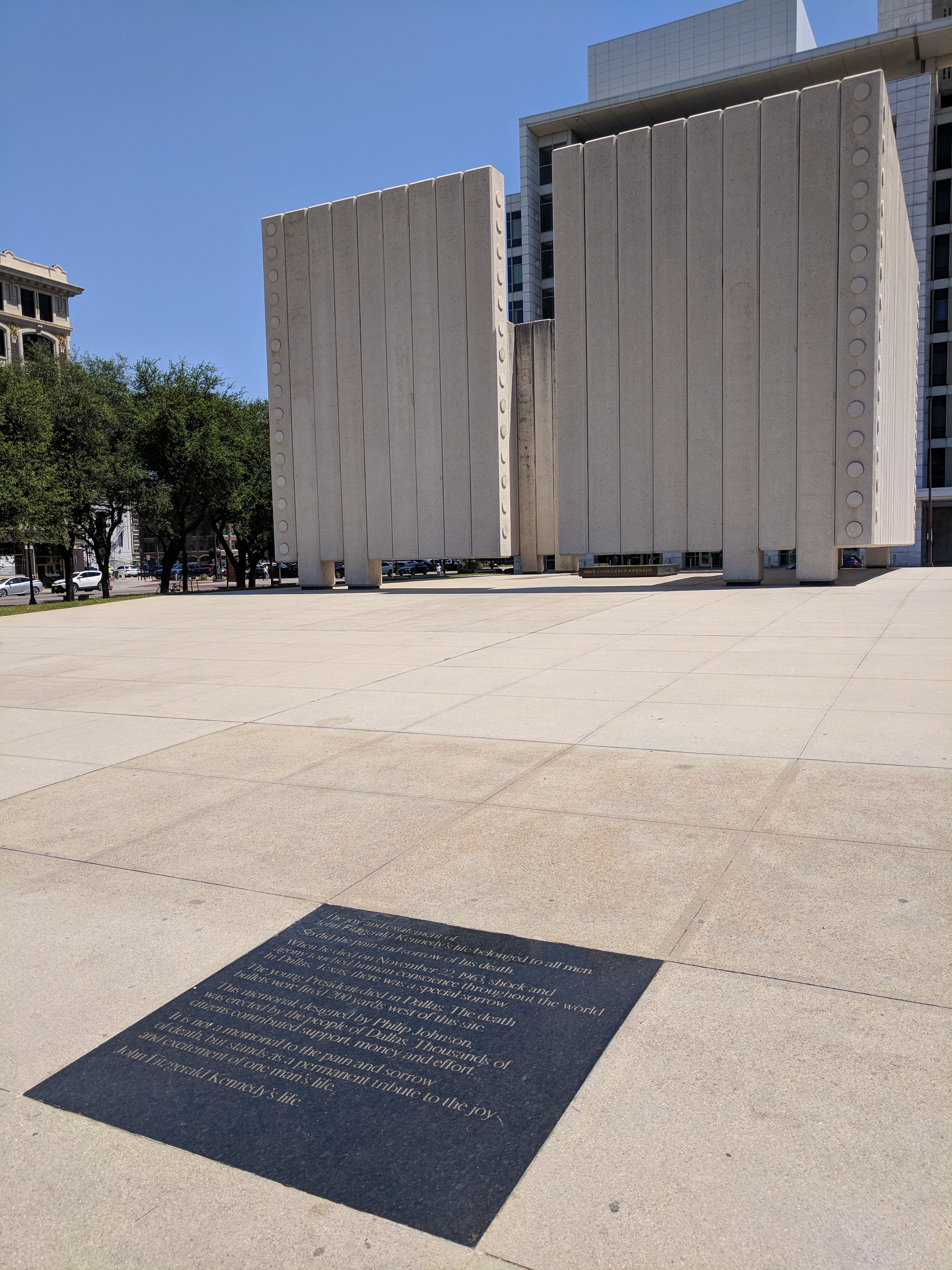
Plaza and granite marker

== History ==
Dallas County Judge Lew Sterrett was credited as the first to propose a monument to Kennedy on November 24, 1963, two days after the assassination. The concept became a formal proposal on December 2, when Sterrett formed the John F. Kennedy Citizens Memorial Committee with Mayor Earle Cabell and two dozen prominent Dallas citizens. However, other Dallas civic leaders, including former mayor R.L. Thornton, said the memorial was better placed in Washington D.C., attempting to distance Dallas from the infamy it had gained as the assassination site. The Committee solicited designs for a memorial after its formation; 260 proposals were received within a week, and 700 proposals were received by February 1964.

On February 5, 1964, the committee, led by W. Dawson Sterling, announced it had met for a fifth time to narrow down the proposals to three or four finalists. On February 22, 1964, the committee announced that two memorials would be created: one at the John F. Kennedy Library in Boston, and another "dignified and modest memorial near the assassination site". The location near the Old Red Courthouse was chosen in April 1964. The original location, announced as the block bounded by Main, Elm, Record, and Market streets, was shifted to another plaza one block south bounded by Main, Record, Market, and Commerce. Both plazas were owned by Dallas County and were being prepared as part of the new Dallas County Court House, then under construction. By September, the concept for the Kennedy Plaza included a green space with a modest marker.

Committee member Stanley Marcus flew to New York and successfully asked Philip Johnson to take on the memorial design, which he did for no fee. Johnson's proposal model was shown to the Committee in December 1964, and the Committee formally announced the design on December 12, hoping to demolish the existing buildings and have the memorial ready by November 1968, the fifth anniversary of the assassination. An underground parking facility was built under the memorial site, however, and construction did not start until 1969. The Committee stated in June 1969 the memorial was being constructed for a reasonable fee and would be dedicated by January 1, 1970. It was finally dedicated on June 24, 1970, in a ceremony attended by 300 people. Sargent Shriver was the first Kennedy family member to visit the memorial in 1972.

=== Management ===
The memorial was vandalized with graffiti in the spring of 1999. In mid 1999, The Sixth Floor Museum at Dealey Plaza undertook management of the memorial, rallying the support of Dallas County and the City of Dallas. The Museum became caretaker of the monument and launched a full-scale restoration project aimed at preserving the memorial and its history. Philip Johnson, the original architect for the monument, guided the restoration process implemented by Corgan Associates, Inc. and Phoenix I Restoration and Construction, Ltd. Numerous local suppliers donated the labor, materials, and equipment required to return the memorial to its original beauty. In 2000, a panel of experts wrote an explanation of the memorial to satisfy the public.

The monument attracts approximately 500,000 visitors annually.

== Critical reception ==
Soon after the Kennedy Memorial was completed, Gary Cartwright wrote in 1971 for The New York Times the "memorial seems esthetically spare, even forbidding", true to the concept proposed by Johnson. In a 1999 interview with The Washington Post, Johnson confirmed the concept: "I don't think it's sterile, of course. I love it. The idea of going into an empty room with nothing to help you, except to think about the slain president, I think that's a very moving image." Cartwright also noted the memorial "was erected, after much delay, by the city fathers of Dallas."

Architectural critic Witold Rybczynski wrote in 2006 that the monument is "poorly done", likening its precast concrete slab walls to "mammoth Lego blocks", and commented that Kennedy "deserved better than this". On the 50th anniversary of Kennedy's assassination, Dallas Morning News architecture critic Mark Lamster called the monument "a disappointing product of the city's ambivalent response to the events of November 1963" and said that Johnson lacked "an animating vision that might have produced an inspiring design. This, in turn, was compounded by a lack of experience". Lamster also noted the similarities between Johnson's design and the unrealized Neue Wache redesign proposal for a war memorial in Berlin, created in 1930 by Mies van der Rohe.

Los Angeles Times architecture critic Christopher Hawthorne echoed these prior criticisms in 2013, stating the memorial "symbolizes the city's deep ambivalence about commemorating the assassination. A spare cenotaph, or open tomb, designed to be built in marble, it was instead cast in cheaper concrete. And its location east of the assassination site suggested an effort to tuck the history of that day away."

== See also ==
- Four Freedoms Park, designed by Louis Kahn and compared to Johnson's Kennedy Memorial by The New York Times
- List of memorials to John F. Kennedy
- List of National Historic Landmarks in Texas
- National Register of Historic Places listings in Dallas County, Texas
- List of Dallas Landmarks
- Presidential memorials in the United States

== Bibliography ==
- Lord, Philip (April 14, 2003). JFK (A&E Biography). DK Publishing. p. 160. ISBN 978-0-7894-9316-3.
- Brosio, M.D. (2016). The JFK Memorial and Power in America. Createspace Publishing. ISBN 1492861871.
