= West End station (DART) =

DART rail station in Dallas, Texas

West End
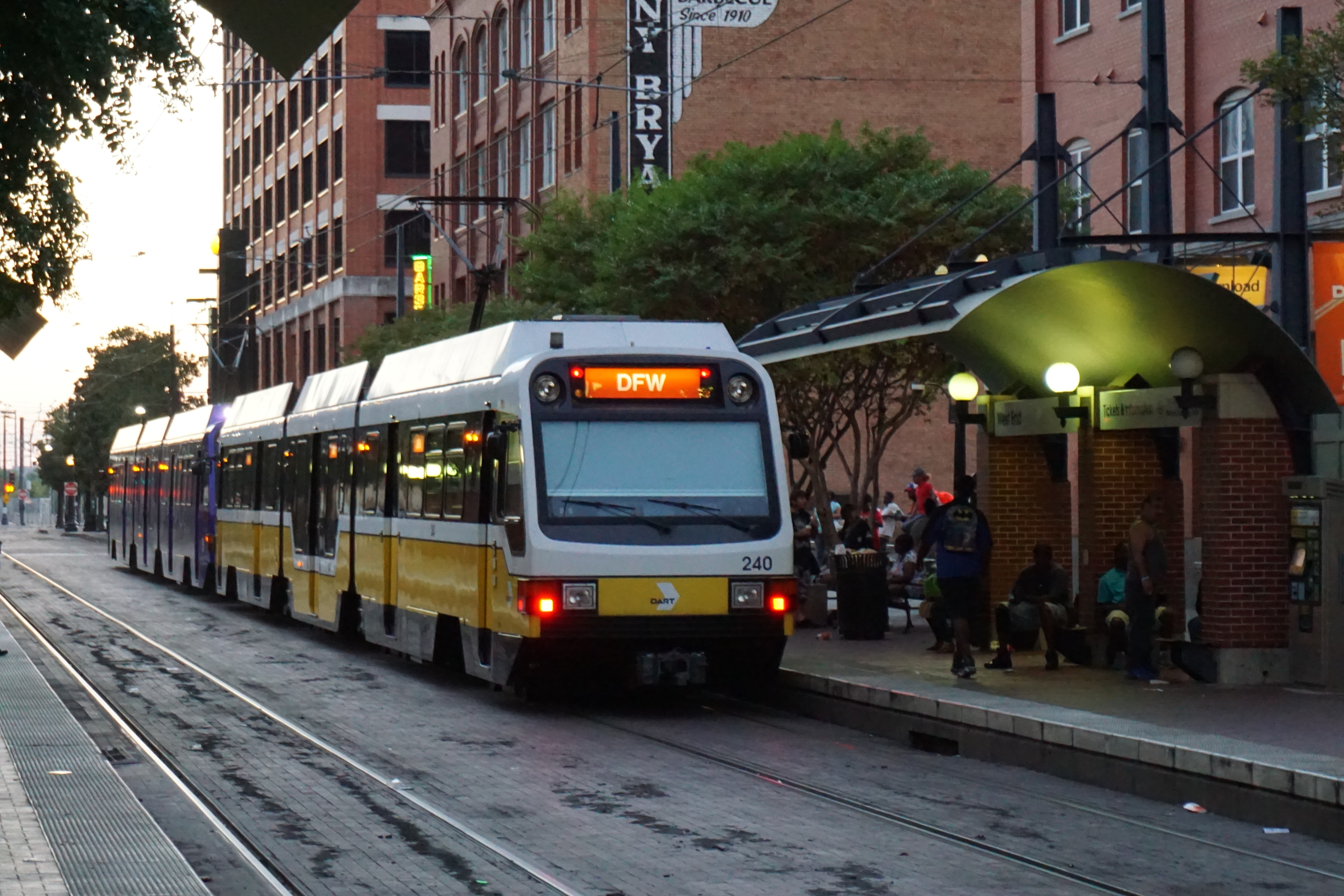
- Northbound Orange Line train departs West End station in September 2015

General information
- Location: 800 Pacific Ave. Dallas, Texas
- Coordinates: 32°46′51″N 96°48′21″W
- Owner: Dallas Area Rapid Transit
- Platforms: 2 side platforms
- Tracks: 2
- Connections: DART: 23 routes at adjacent West Transfer Center/Rosa Parks Plaza; West Dallas Shuttle

Construction
- Structure type: At-grade
- Accessible: Yes

History
- Opened: June 14, 1996

Passengers
- FY 2025: 6,182 (avg. weekday) ▼5.3%

Services
Preceding station	DART	Following station
Union Station toward UNT Dallas	Blue Line	Akard toward Downtown Rowlett
Victory toward North Carrollton/Frankford	Green Line	Akard toward Buckner
Victory toward DFW Airport Terminal A	Orange Line	Akard toward LBJ/Central or Parker Road
Union Station toward Westmoreland	Red Line	Akard toward Parker Road
Location

West End station is a DART rail station in Downtown Dallas, Texas. Located on a two-block stretch of Pacific Avenue between Market Street and Lamar Street, the station serves the West End Historic District, including Dealey Plaza, the Sixth Floor Museum, the Dallas World Aquarium, Old Red Courthouse, and Dallas College El Centro Campus.

The station serves all four of the system's light rail lines (Red, Blue, Green, and Orange), as well as 23 bus routes at the adjacent West Transfer Center and Rosa Parks Plaza. It is the westernmost station to be served by all four lines.

As of the 2025 fiscal year, the station has the highest ridership of all DART rail stations, with an average of 6,182 riders on weekdays, 4,509 riders on Saturdays, and 3,566 riders on Sundays.

== History ==
The station opened on June 14, 1996 as part of the original light rail system.

Following the shooting of Dallas police officers on July 7, 2016, the station was closed during the investigation of the nearby crime scene. Trains were stopping at all transit mall stations except West End, which they passed through during the incident. News outlets reported that ridership was lower than normal just after the attacks at nearby stations such as Akard, St. Paul, and Pearl/Arts District, typically busy stations during the morning rush hour.
