= East Transfer Center =

Bus-only station in Downtown Dallas, Texas

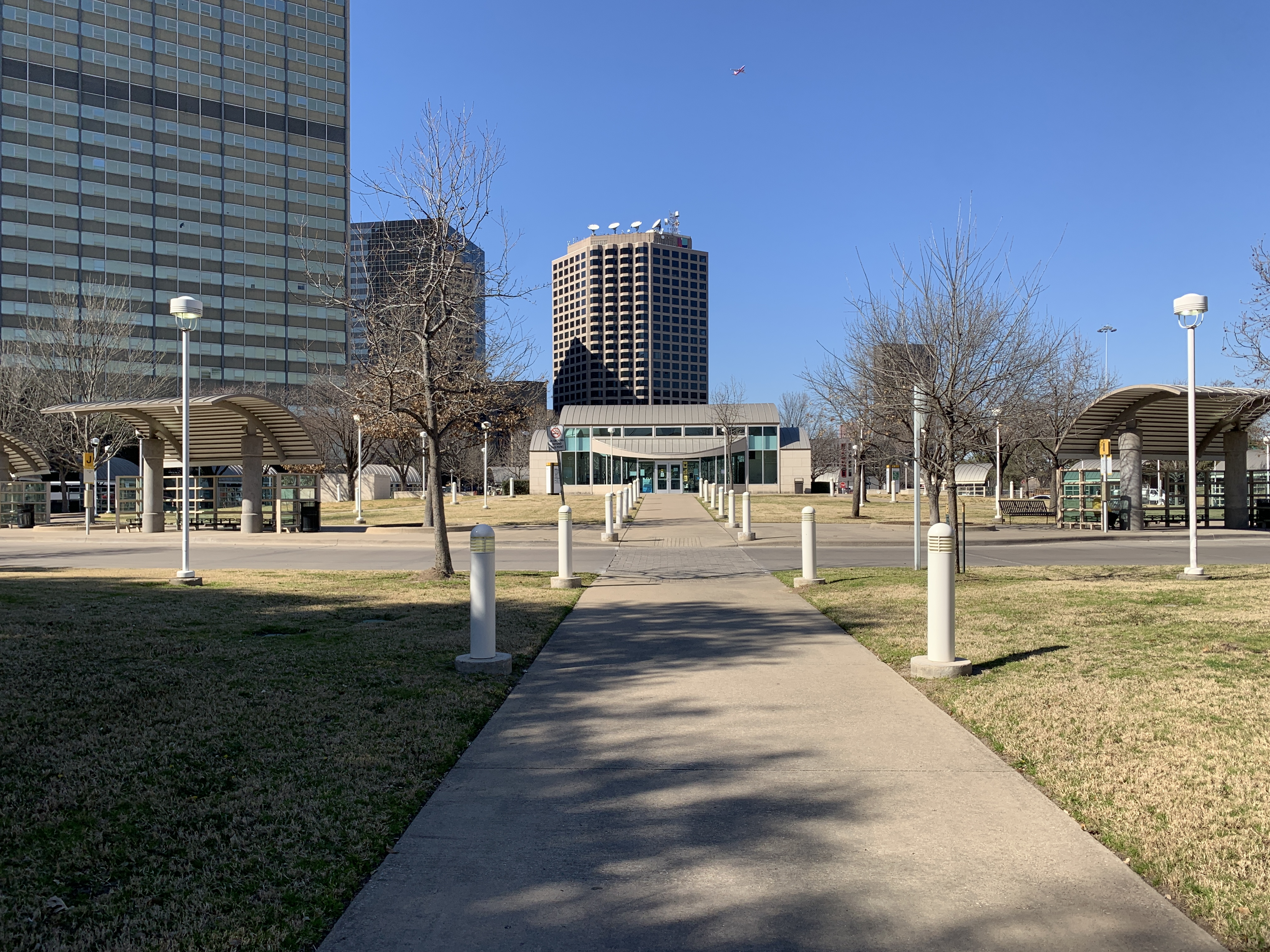

General information
- Location: 330 North Olive Street; Dallas, Texas
- Coordinates: 32°47′03″N 96°47′37″W
- Owner: Dallas Area Rapid Transit
- Bus routes: DART: 1, 3, 102, 109, 145, 147, 205, 230, 237
- Bus stands: 16
- Connections: at Pearl/Arts District

Construction
- Accessible: Yes

History
- Opened: January 1997
Location

East Transfer Center (also known as Central Business District East or CBD East) is a bus-only station in Downtown Dallas, Texas, operated by Dallas Area Rapid Transit. Located at the intersection of Live Oak Street and Pearl Street, the station serves eastern downtown and nine bus routes. The station also features an indoor waiting area, restrooms, and a service desk.

All four light rail lines in the DART rail system can be accessed at Pearl/Arts District station, located one block northwest at the intersection of Pearl Street and Bryan Street. A subway station under the East Transit Center was proposed as part of the D2 Subway project, but that project has been put on indefinite hiatus.

== See also ==
- Pearl/Arts District station
- West Transfer Center
