= Akard station =

DART rail station in Dallas, Texas

Akard
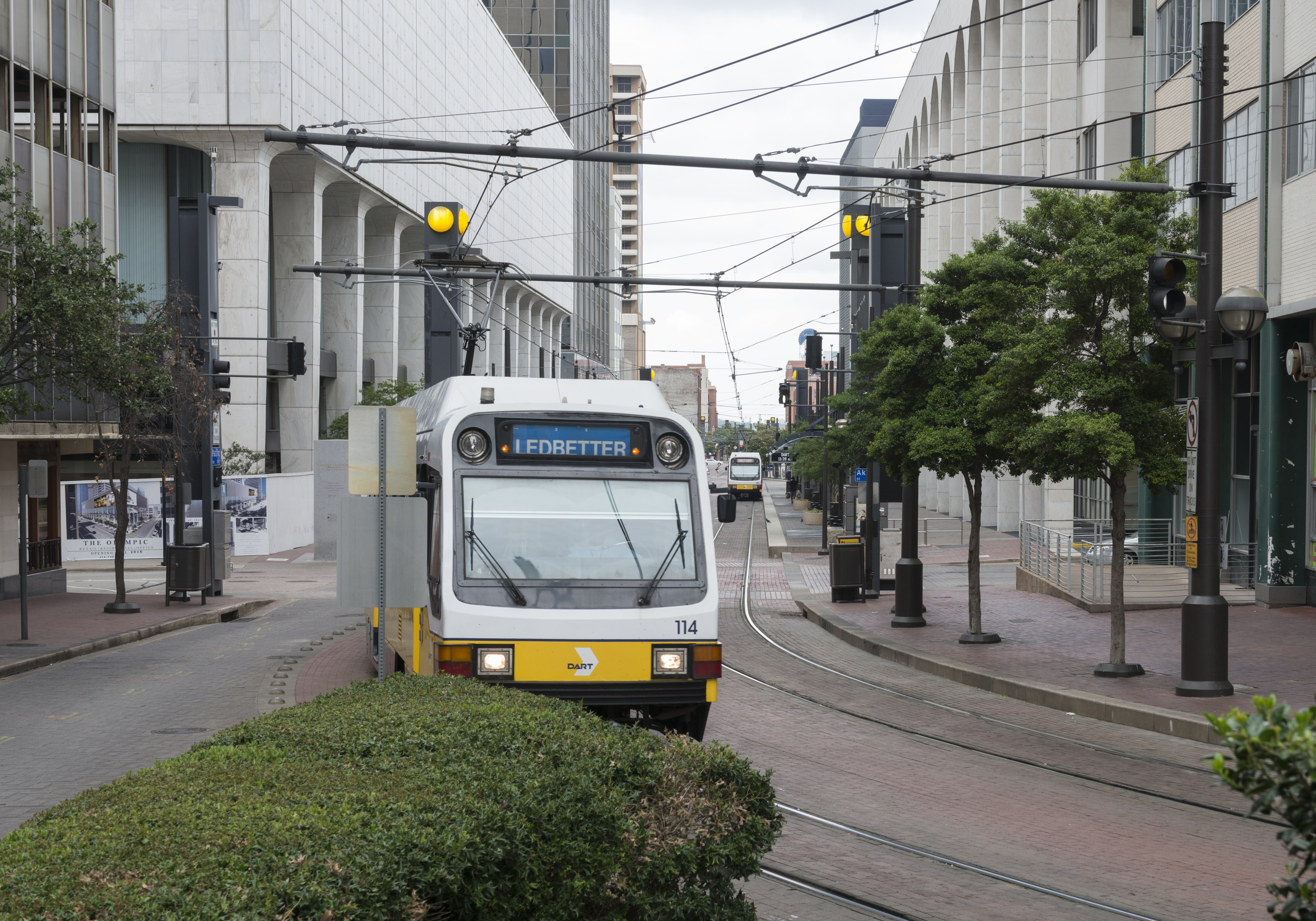
- Akard station in 2014 (DART headquarters on right)

General information
- Location: 1400 Pacific Ave. Dallas, Texas
- Coordinates: 32°46′55″N 96°48′02″W
- System: DART rail
- Owner: Dallas Area Rapid Transit
- Platforms: 2 side platforms
- Tracks: 2
- Connections: DART: 306 (M-F)

Construction
- Structure type: At-grade
- Accessible: Yes

History
- Opened: June 14, 1996

Passengers
- FY 2025: 3,892 (avg. weekday) ▲12.6%

Services
Preceding station	DART	Following station
West End toward UNT Dallas	Blue Line	St. Paul toward Downtown Rowlett
West End toward North Carrollton/Frankford	Green Line	St. Paul toward Buckner
West End toward DFW Airport Terminal A	Orange Line	St. Paul toward LBJ/Central or Parker Road
West End toward Westmoreland	Red Line	St. Paul toward Parker Road
Location

Akard station is a DART rail station in Downtown Dallas, Texas. Located along Pacific Avenue between Akard Street and Field Street, the station serves Thanks-Giving Square, Santander Tower, Renaissance Tower, and Downtown Dallas's Main Street District, including Pegasus Plaza, the Kirby Building, the Eye sculpture, and the Adolphus Hotel. The station also serves DART's headquarters and customer service center, which are located in the Sanger Harris Building on the station's north side.

The station serves all four of the system's light rail lines (Red, Blue, Green, and Orange), as well as a weekday express route to Glenn Heights Park & Ride, which boards from Field Street.

The station opened on June 14, 1996 as part of the original light rail system.
