= West End Historic District (Dallas) =

Neighborhood in Dallas, Texas, U.S.

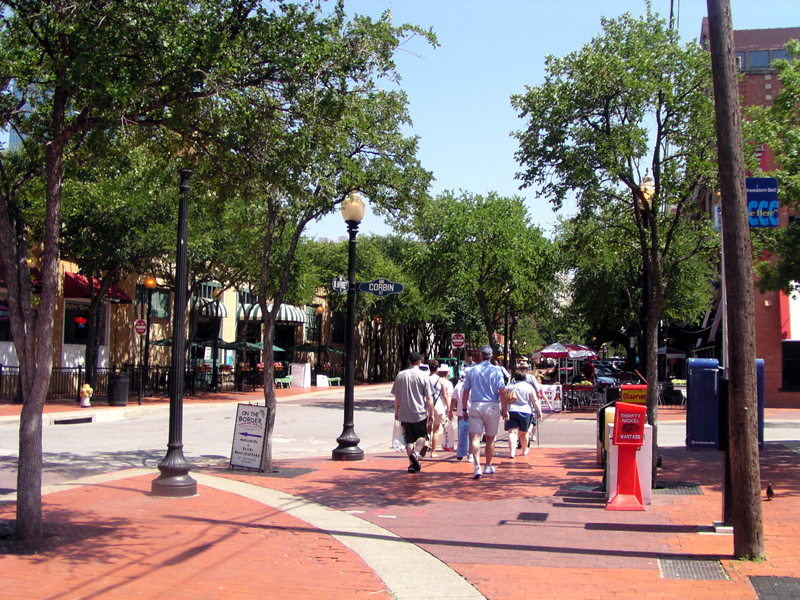
- Tourists in the West End stroll down Market Street

- Location in Dallas
- Country: United States
- State: Texas
- Counties: Dallas
- City: Dallas
- Area: Downtown
- Elevation: 423 ft (129 m)
- ZIP code: 75202
- Area codes: 214, 469, 972
- Website: West End Historic District
- Westend Historic District
- U.S. National Register of Historic Places
- U.S. Historic district
- Dallas Landmark Historic District
- Location within Texas Location within the United States
- Location: Bounded by Lamar, Griffin, Wood, Market, and Commerce Sts., Dallas, Texas
- Coordinates: 32°46′44″N 96°48′21″W
- Area: 67.5 acres (27.3 ha)
- Built: 1891
- Architect: Multiple
- Architectural style: Chicago, Late 19th and Early 20th Century American Movements, Romanesque
- NRHP reference No.: 78002918
- DLMKHD No.: H/2

Significant dates
- Added to NRHP: November 14, 1978
- Designated DLMKHD: October 6, 1975

The West End Historic District of Dallas, Texas, United States, is a historic district that includes a 67.5-acre (27.3 ha) area in northwest downtown, generally north of Commerce, east of I-35E, west of Lamar and south of the Woodall Rodgers Freeway. It is south of Victory Park, west of the Arts, City Center, and Main Street districts, and north of the Government and Reunion districts. A portion of the district is listed on the U.S. National Register of Historic Places as Westend Historic District. A smaller area is also a Dallas Landmark District. The far western part of the district belongs to the Dealey Plaza Historic District, a National Historic Landmark around structures and memorials associated with the assassination of John F. Kennedy.

== History ==
The area that would become the West End originally consisted simply of a trading post, established by John Neely Bryan. In July 1872, the Houston & Texas Central Railroad arrived downtown, attracting manufacturing companies whose warehouses would come to define the architecture of the West End.

The district reached nationwide prominence in the 1960s, when President John F. Kennedy was assassinated in a presidential motorcade traveling through Dealey Plaza. While the assassination brought the attention to the West End, the district's economy still struggled, with many businesses leaving the city center for suburban locations.

As development changed downtown Dallas and older buildings were demolished, local developer Preston Carter Jr. began the revitalization of the West End in June 1976 in an effort to preserve its history. Old warehouses and other brick buildings were converted to restaurants and shops. In November 1978, the West End Historic District was listed on the National Register of Historic Places.

Today, over seven million people visit the West End annually, making it one of the city's leading tourist attractions. In recent years the area has suffered a decline. The West End Marketplace, a massive mall/entertainment complex, closed its doors on June 30, 2006. Due to the recent development of Victory Park, the main marketplace was redeveloped into an apartment and business complex.

== Attractions ==
- John Fitzgerald Kennedy Memorial
- Old Red Museum
- Dallas World Aquarium
- Dallas Holocaust Museum/Center for Education & Tolerance
- The Sixth Floor Museum, located in the Texas School Book Depository, the building from which Lee Harvey Oswald shot President John F. Kennedy according to the conclusions of four government investigations.
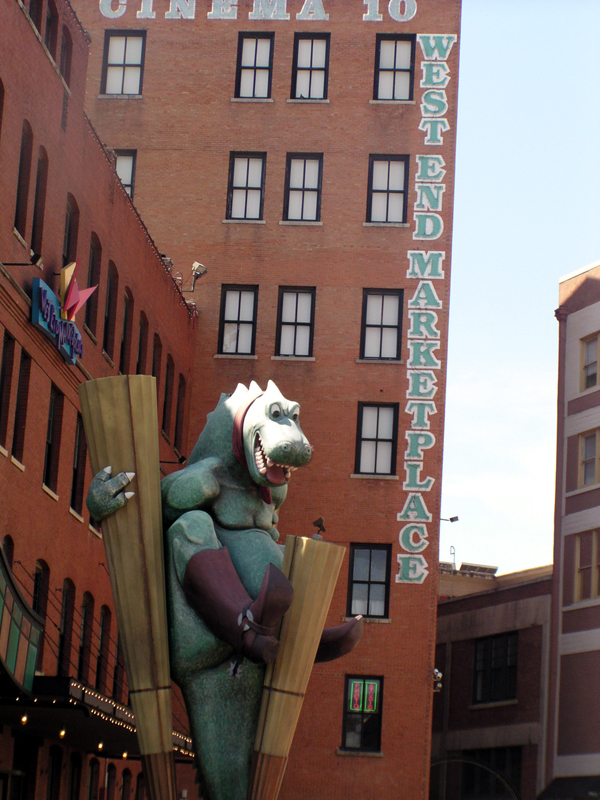
A giant dinosaur greets visitors to the West End Market Place (Picture circa 2002. No longer there)

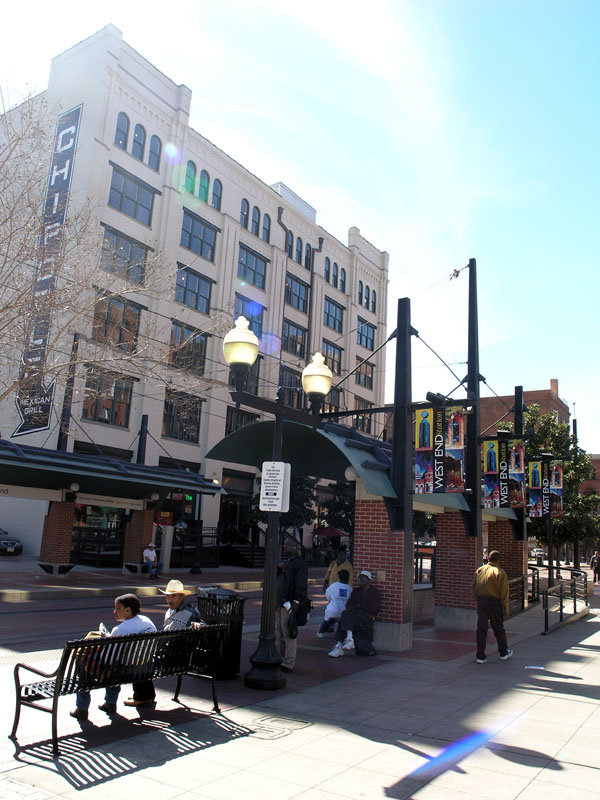
Looking west along Pacific Street at West End Station

== Transportation ==
=== Light rail ===
- DART: Blue Line, Red Line, Green Line, Orange Line
  - West End Station

== Education ==
The district is zoned to schools in the Dallas Independent School District.

Residents of the district south of Pacific are zoned to City Park Elementary School, Billy Earl Dade Middle School, and James Madison High School. Residents north of Pacific are zoned to Hope Medrano Elementary School, Thomas J. Rusk Middle School, and North Dallas High School.

Private schools

== See also ==
- National Register of Historic Places listings in Dallas County, Texas
- List of Dallas Landmarks
