= Dallas County Courthouse (Texas) =

Courthouse in Dallas, Texas, U.S.

- U.S. National Register of Historic Places
- U.S. National Historic Landmark District – Contributing property
- U.S. Historic district – Contributing property
- Texas State Antiquities Landmark
- Recorded Texas Historic Landmark
- Dallas Landmark Historic District; Contributing Property
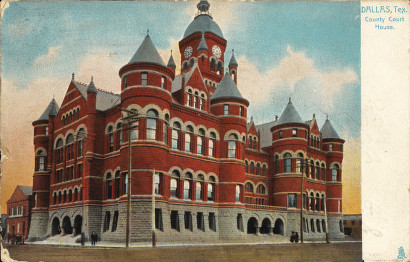
- Dallas County Courthouse postcard, circa 1909
- Interactive map showing the location for the former Dallas County Courthouse
- Location: 100 S. Houston St., Dallas, Texas, U.S.
- Coordinates: 32°46′45″N 96°48′25″W
- Area: 2 acres (0.81 ha)
- Built: 1891
- Architects: Orlopp & Kusener
- Architectural style: Romanesque
- Website: Old Red Museum of Dallas County History & Culture
- Part of: Dealey Plaza Historic District (ID93001607); Westend Historic District (ID78002918)
- NRHP reference No.: 76002019
- TSAL No.: 8200000203
- RTHL No.: 6811
- DLMKHD No.: H/2 (West End HD)

Significant dates
- Added to NRHP: December 12, 1976
- Designated NHLDCP: April 19, 1993
- Designated CP: November 14, 1978
- Designated TSAL: January 1, 1981
- Designated RTHL: 1977
- Designated DLMKHD: October 6, 1975

The Dallas County Courthouse, built in 1892 of red sandstone with rusticated marble accents, is a historic governmental building located at 100 South Houston Street in Dallas, Texas, United States. Four of five previous courthouse structures were destroyed by fire. Also known as the Old Red Courthouse, it became the Old Red Museum, a local history museum, in 2007. In 2021, it was announced that the Old Red Museum would be moving out and that the building would again be a hall of justice. The Texas Fifth District Court of Appeals moved into Old Red in 2024.

It was designed in the Richardsonian Romanesque style of architecture by architect Max A. Orlopp Jr. of the Little Rock, Arkansas based firm Orlopp & Kusener. Four of five previous courthouse structures were destroyed by fire, which is one reason why the building was constructed using masonry and cubic stone.

In 1904, the famed prohibition activist Carrie Nation gave a fiery lecture on temperance inside one of the courtrooms, attracting a crowd that overflowed into the hallways.

In 1910, the courthouse was the site of the lynching of Allen Brooks. President John F. Kennedy's motorcade passed the courthouse minutes before his assassination on November 22, 1963.

The building's signature clock tower was 123 feet tall and featured a two-ton bell. In 1919, it was removed because it was structurally unstable. The void where the tower was would remain for nearly a century until it was rebuilt as part of a major renovation project in 2007.

In 1935, Sarah T. Hughes was sworn in as the first female judge in Texas.

In 1966, the courthouse was replaced by a newer building nearby. On December 12, 1976, it was added to the National Register of Historic Places. In 2005–2007 the building was renovated.

== Gallery ==
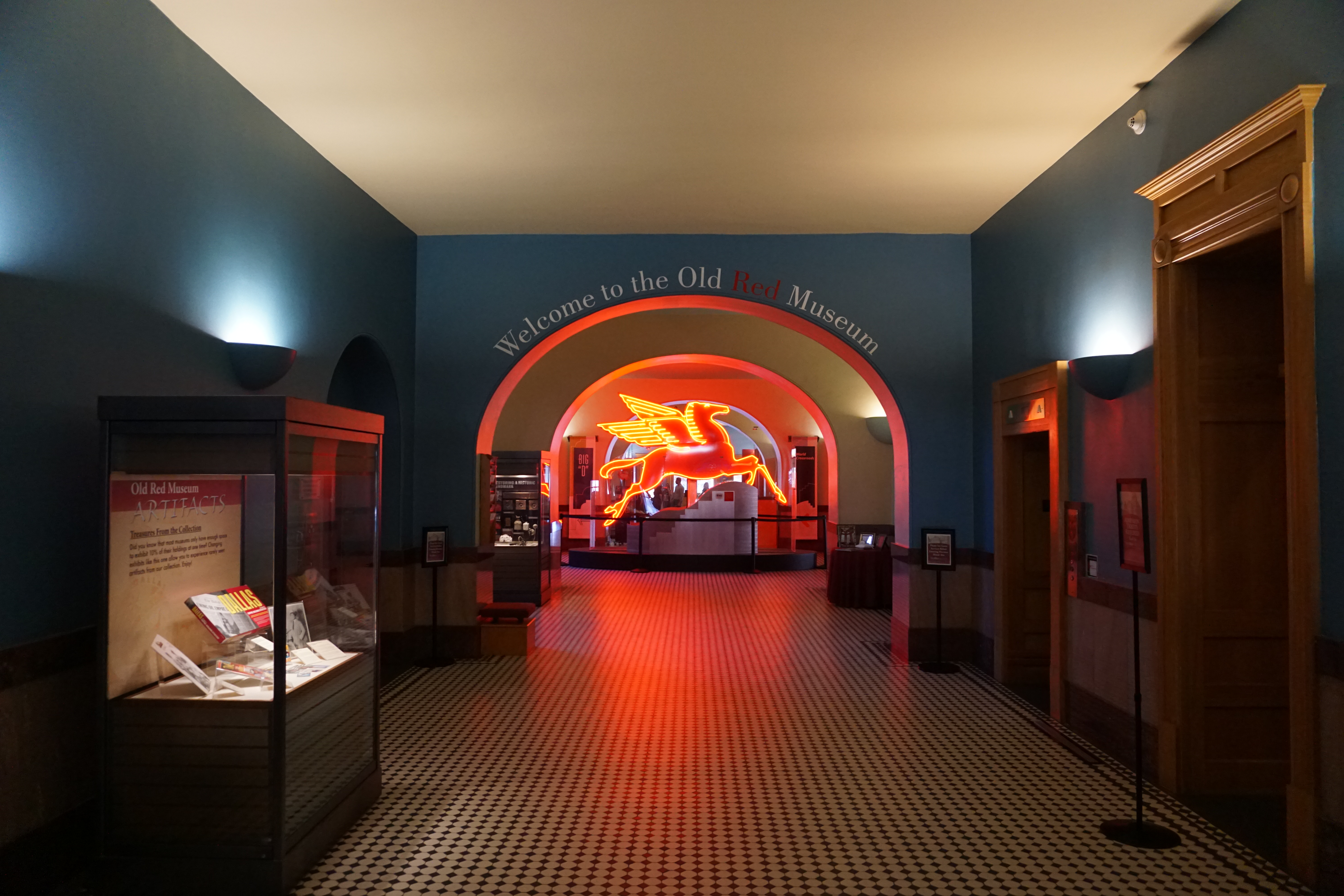
Museum interior

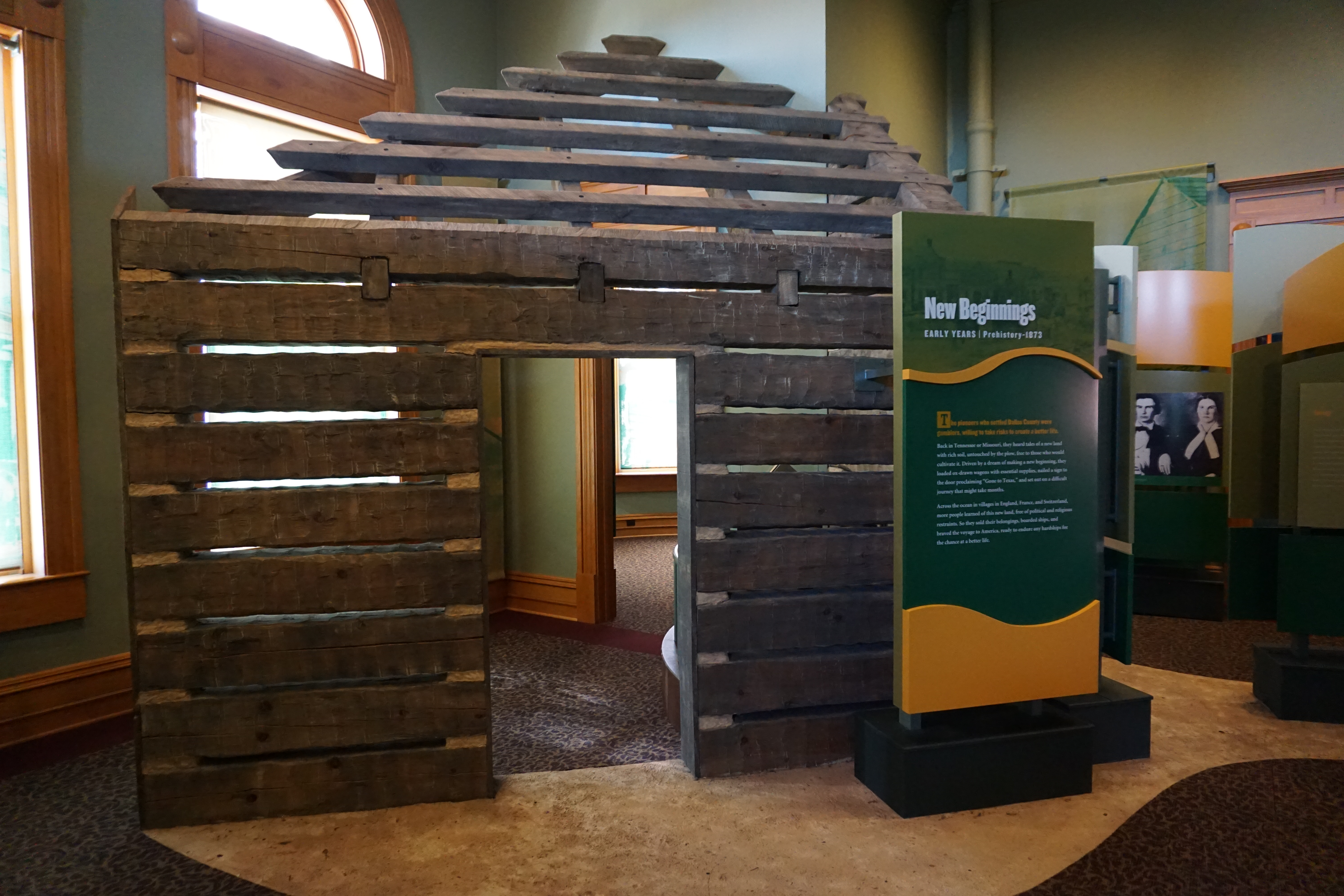
Early Years Gallery

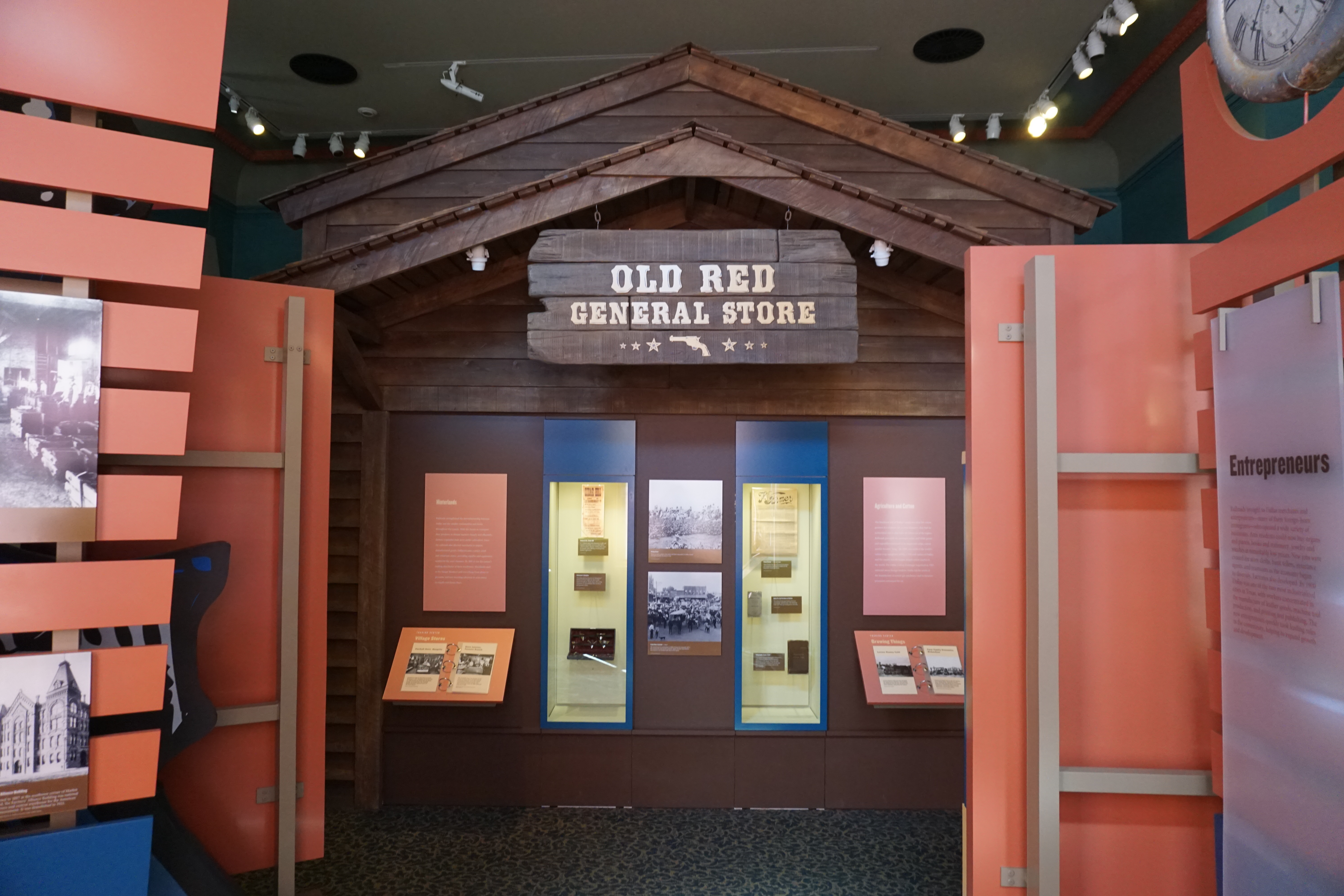
Trading Center Gallery

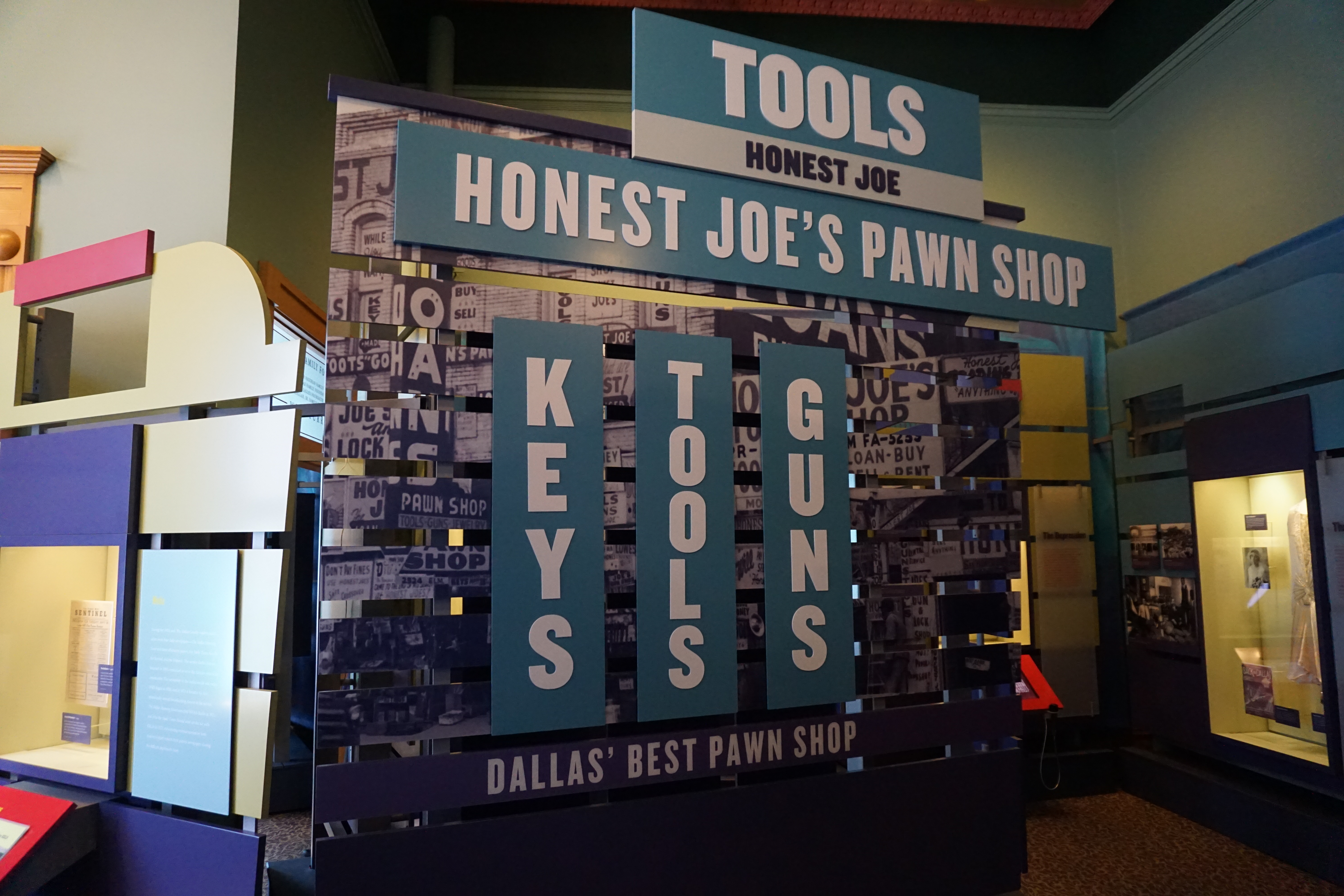
Big "D" Gallery

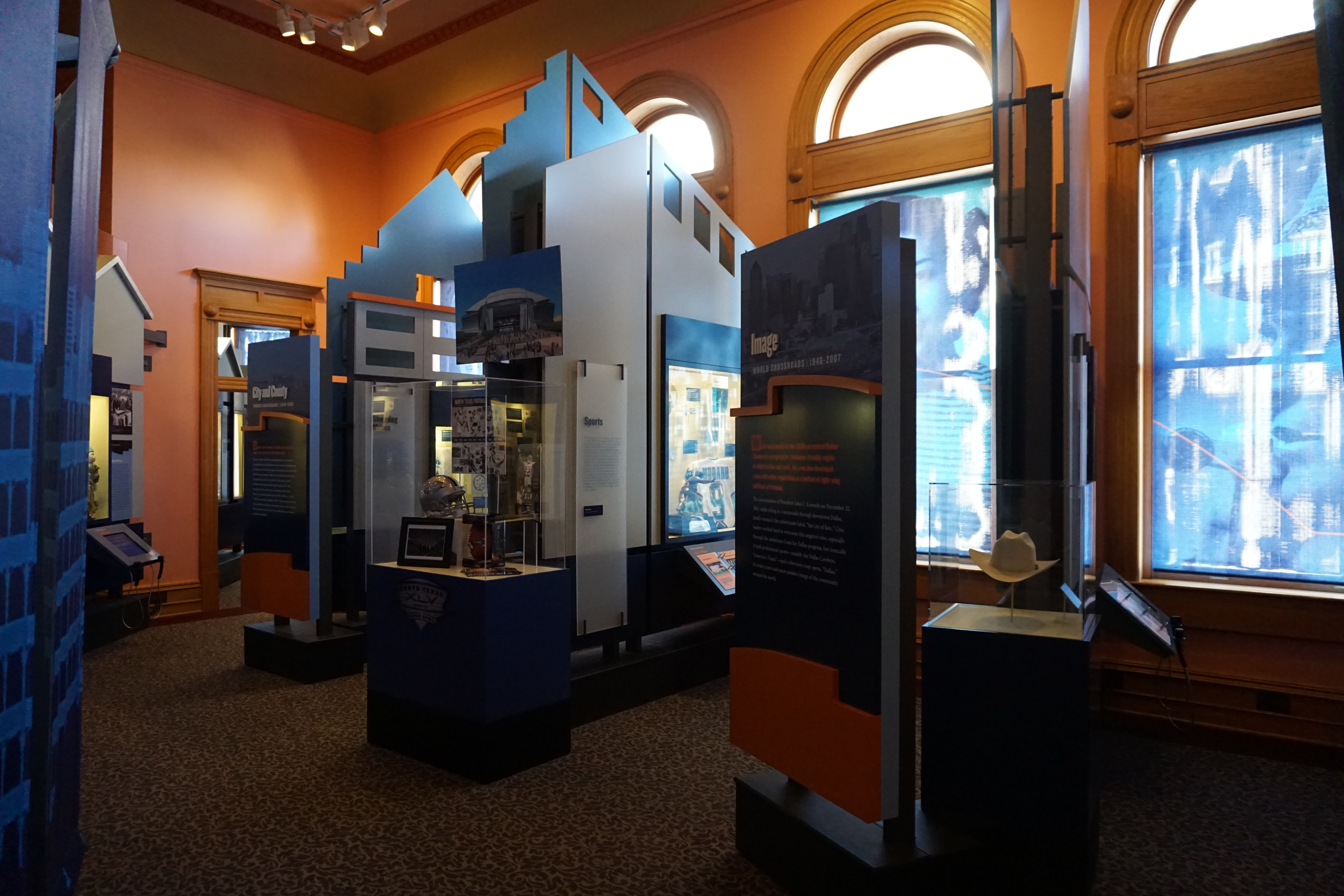
World Crossroads Gallery

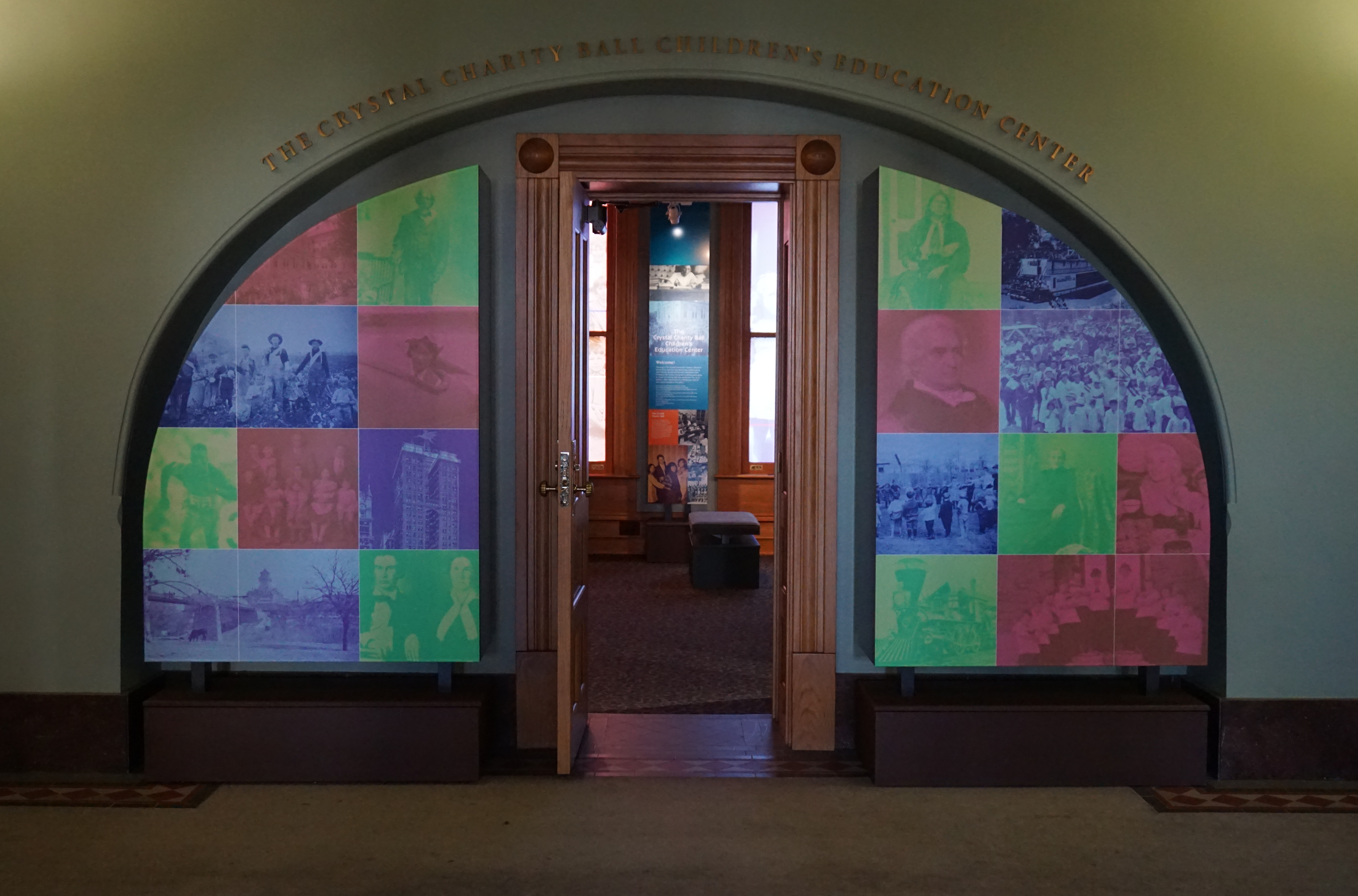
Children's Education Center

== See also ==
- List of county courthouses in Texas
- List of Dallas Landmarks
- List of National Historic Landmarks in Texas
- National Register of Historic Places listings in Dallas County, Texas
- Recorded Texas Historic Landmarks in Dallas County
