= Dallas World Aquarium =

Public aquarium and zoo in Dallas, Texas

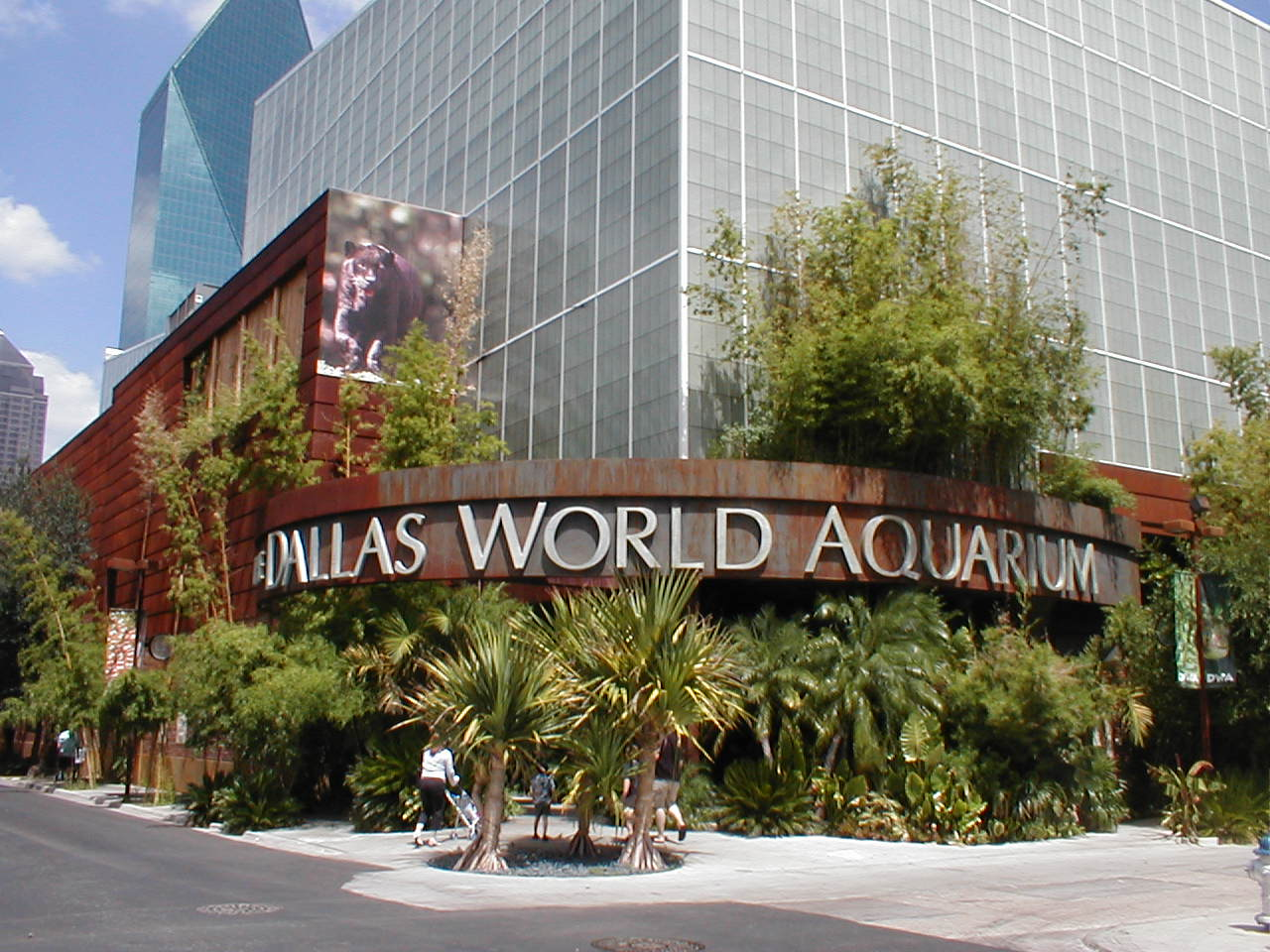
- Dallas World Aquarium
- Interactive map of Dallas World Aquarium
- 32°47′0.44″N 96°48′18.46″W
- Date opened: October 18, 1992
- Location: Dallas, Texas, USA
- Memberships: AZA, WAZA
- Website: dwazoo.com

The Dallas World Aquarium is a for-profit aquarium and zoo located in the West End Historic District of Dallas, Texas, USA. It aids conservation and education by housing many animals that are threatened or endangered as part of a cooperative breeding program with other zoos around the world. It has been an accredited member of the Association of Zoos and Aquariums since 1997 and is a member of the World Association of Zoos and Aquariums.

== History ==
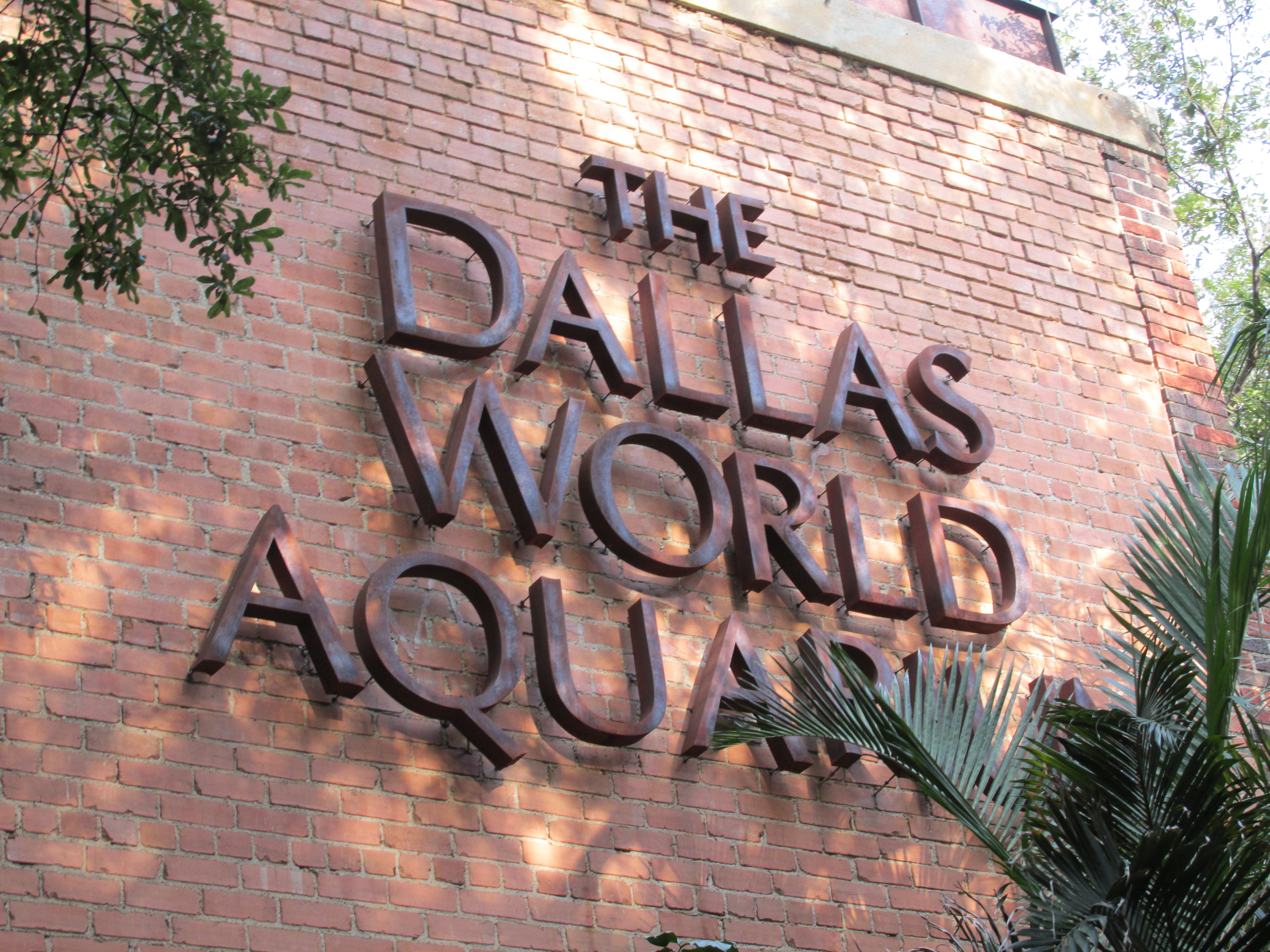

The aquarium was opened in October 1992 in an old 1924 warehouse that had been gutted and rebuilt on the inside. In 1997, "The Orinoco - Secrets of the River" opened in an adjacent warehouse that had been similarly gutted and transformed, and the alley between the two buildings became the divide between freshwater and saltwater exhibits.

In May 2000, it purchased a vacant lot behind the original warehouse for its first new construction, the Mundo Maya exhibit, which opened in August 2004. In 2015 Ben Crair of the New Republic wrote an exposé exposing the darker side of the zoo.

== Exhibits ==
=== Orinoco ===
The upper level of the aquarium is an artificial reproduction of a rainforest canopy with several aviaries and primate enclosures called Orinoco. The second level consists of animals that live in the understory layer while the last level consists of several large Amazonian fish and manatees.

=== Cloud Forest Trek ===
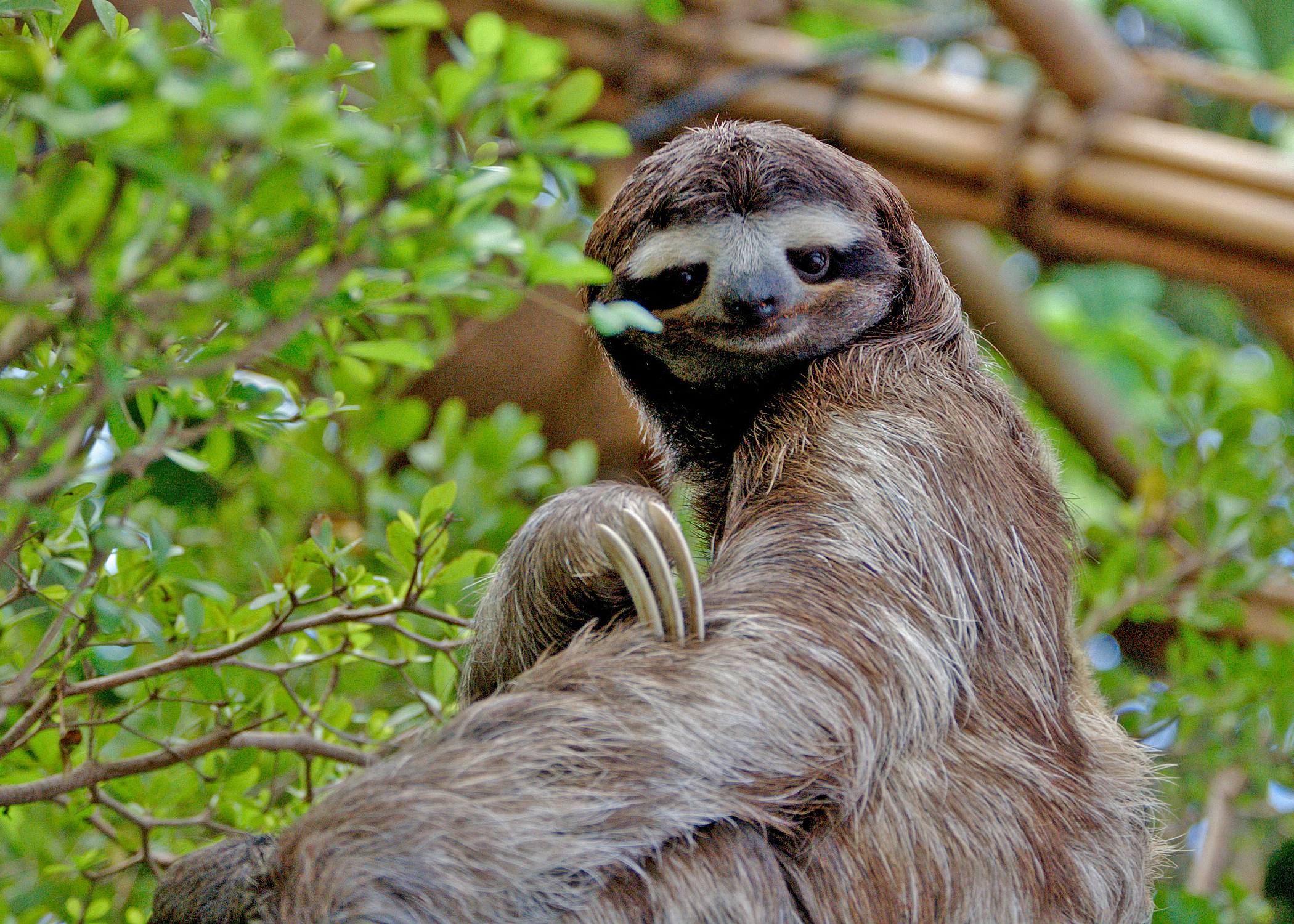
Three-toed sloth in the Dallas World Aquarium

The newest exhibit in the aquarium, the Cloud Forest Trek was opened in November 2021. The aquarium collaborated with SNA Displays to create a LED video screen that can transition from day to night to simulate a real-time rainforest. Here, see the only public display of three-toed sloths in the United States, plus many other Andean animals.

=== Mundo Maya ===
Tropical and marine animals indigenous to Mexico and Central America are featured in this gallery. The area also has a 400,000 gallon tunnel tank with sharks and stingrays, known as the aquarium's "Shark Tunnel" attraction.

=== Aquarium ===
The lower level houses aquaria featuring: fish, sea anemones, coral, jellyfish and other sea animals from around the world. The 10 main tanks feature the aquatic life of: Japan, Indonesia, Sri Lanka, British Columbia, Fiji, Palau, Southern Australia, Lord Howe Island and the Solomon Islands. Other tanks on display include a large tank with a 40-foot (12 m) tunnel where visitors can observe fish of the continental shelf swimming around them.

== Education ==
The aquarium is also part of a joint initiative between local companies and corporations and the Dallas Public School district. Many of its employees are also full-time students at the School of Business and Management at the Yvonne A. Ewell Townview Magnet High School. This joint venture, as part of a work-study program by the school, emphasizes real-world business techniques and practices to teach the upcoming generation on maintaining and running the day-to-day operations of one of the city's largest and most well-known attractions.

== Gallery ==
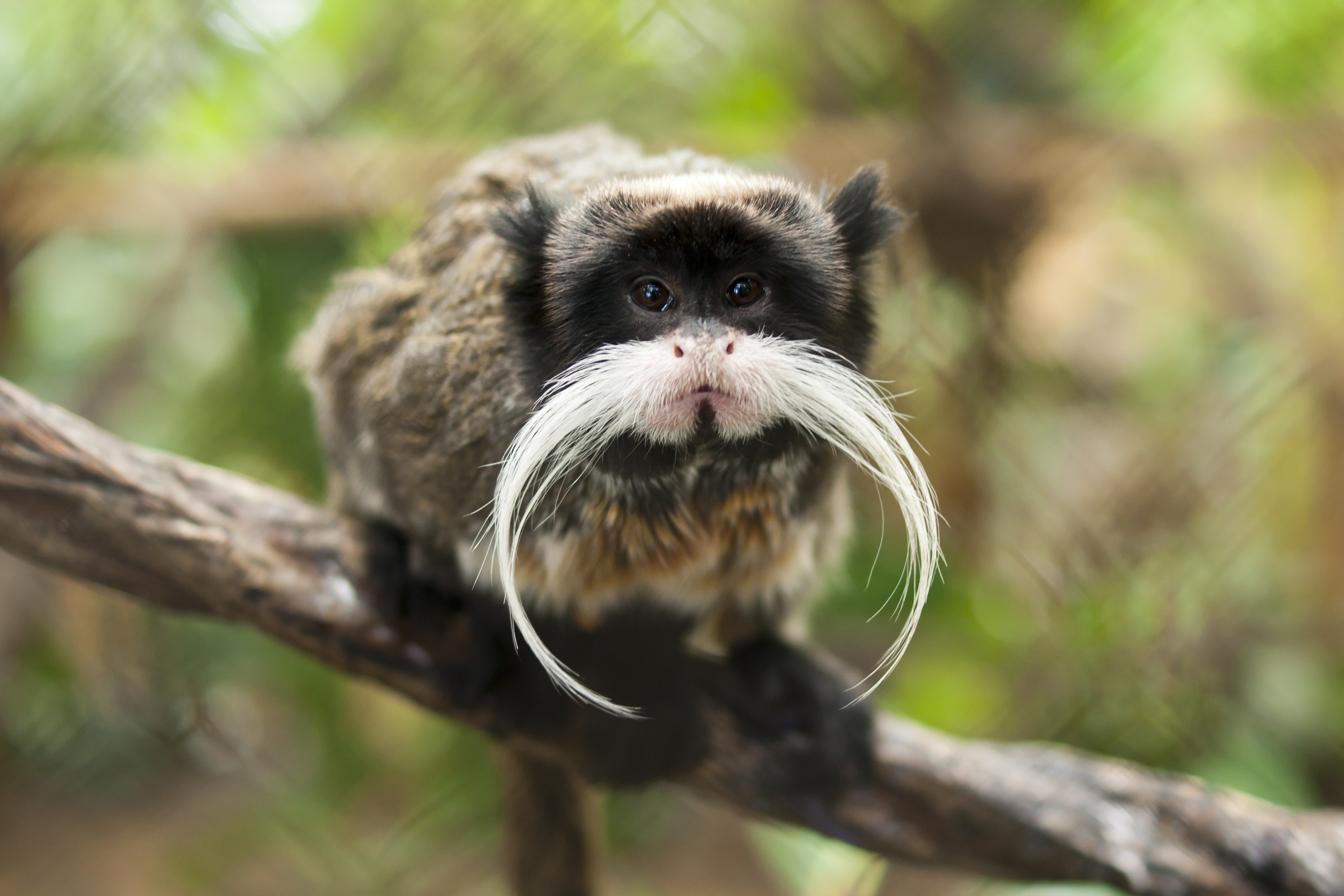

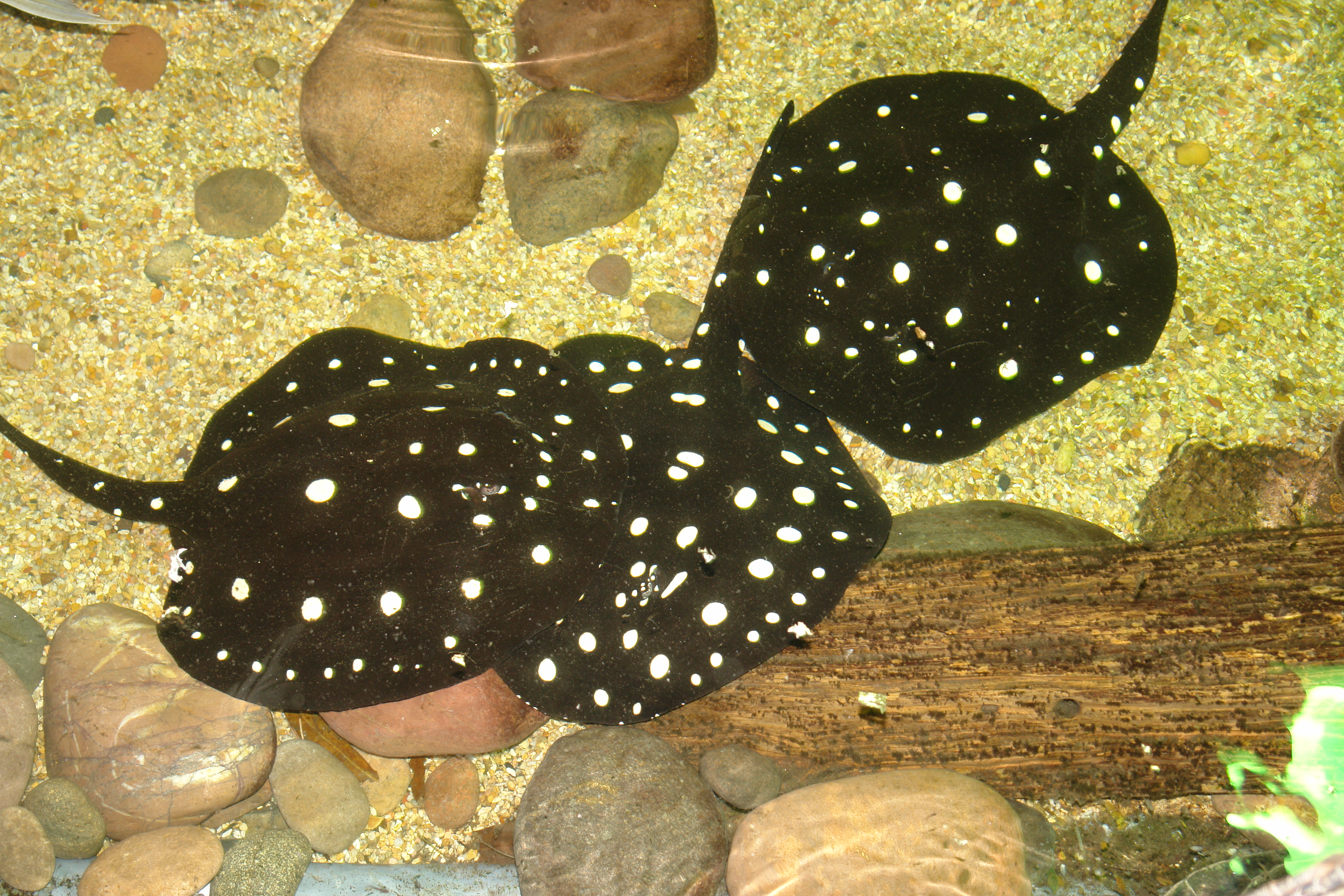
Three Xingu River rays

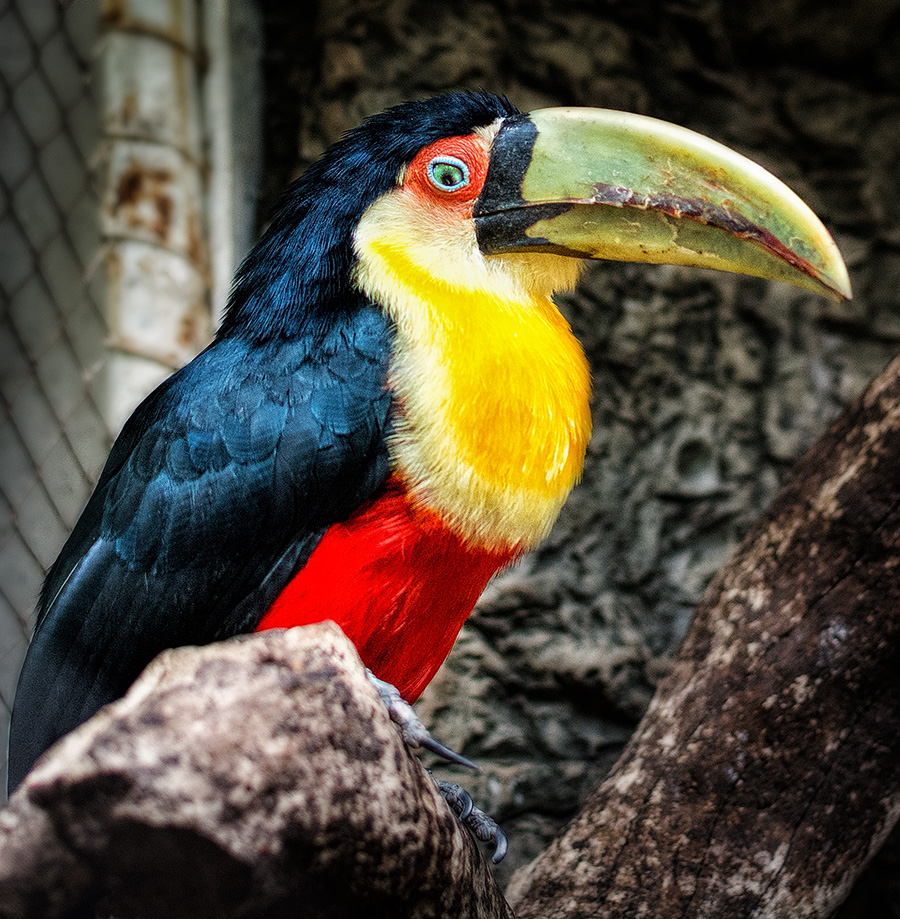

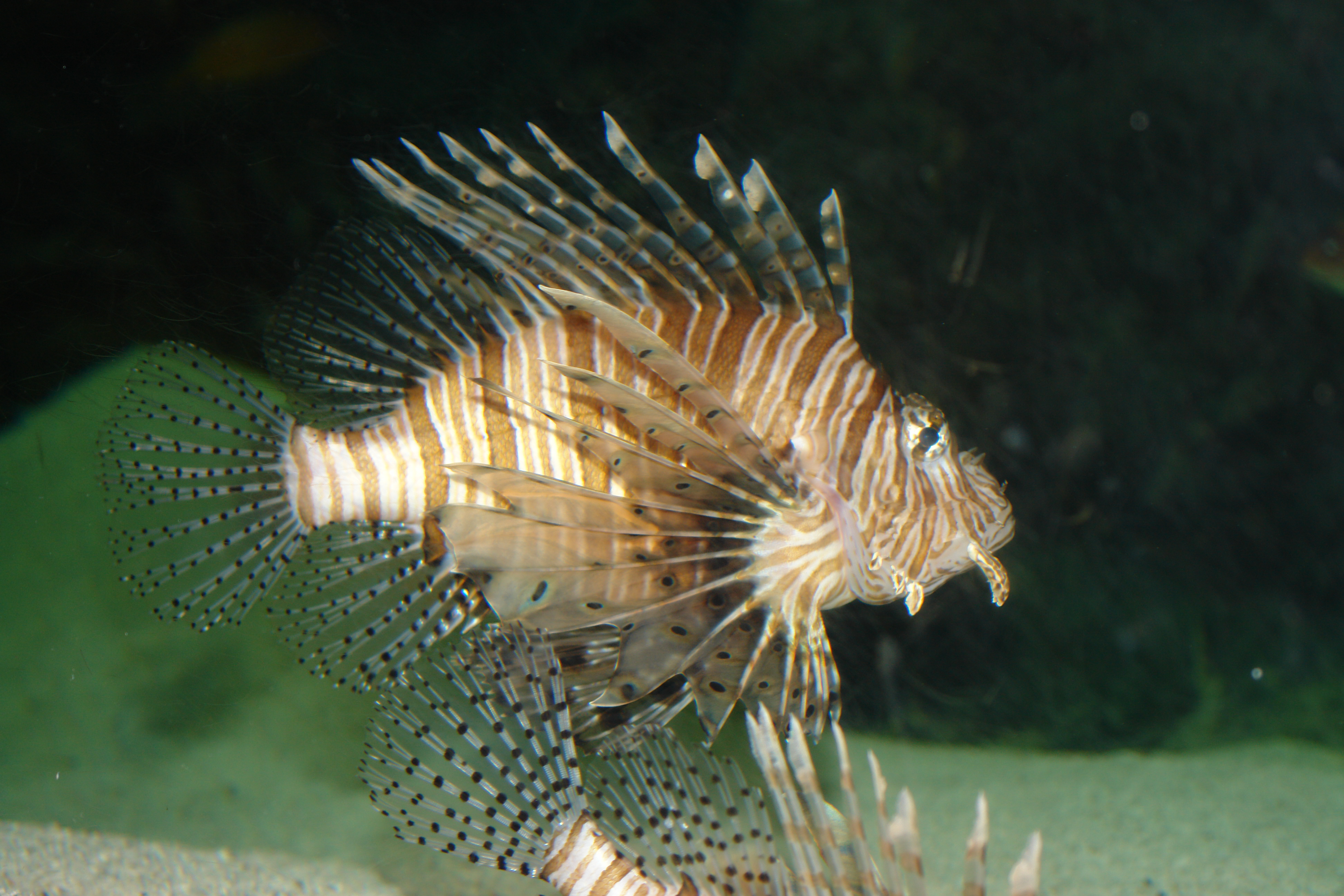
Lionfish

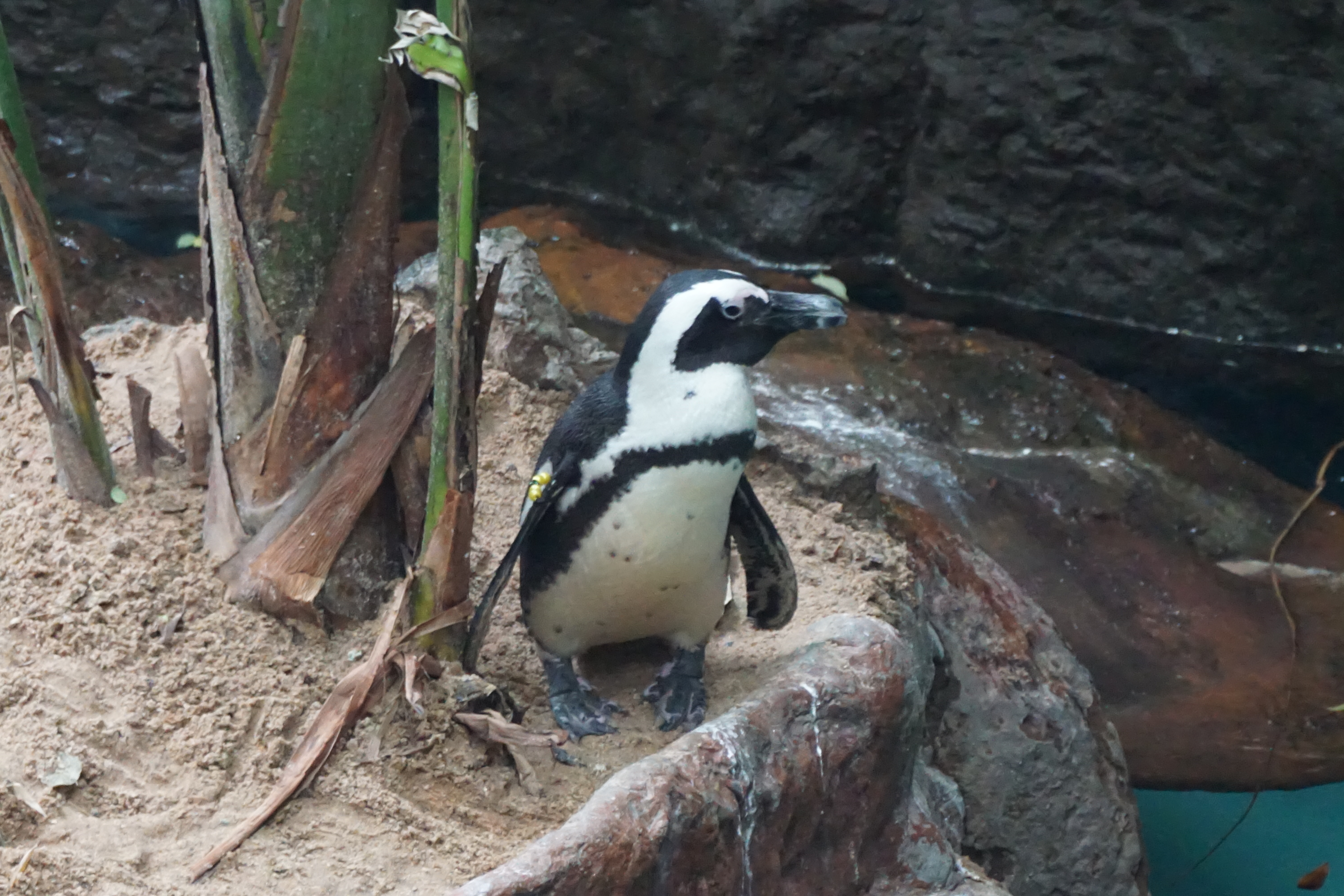
Black-footed penguin

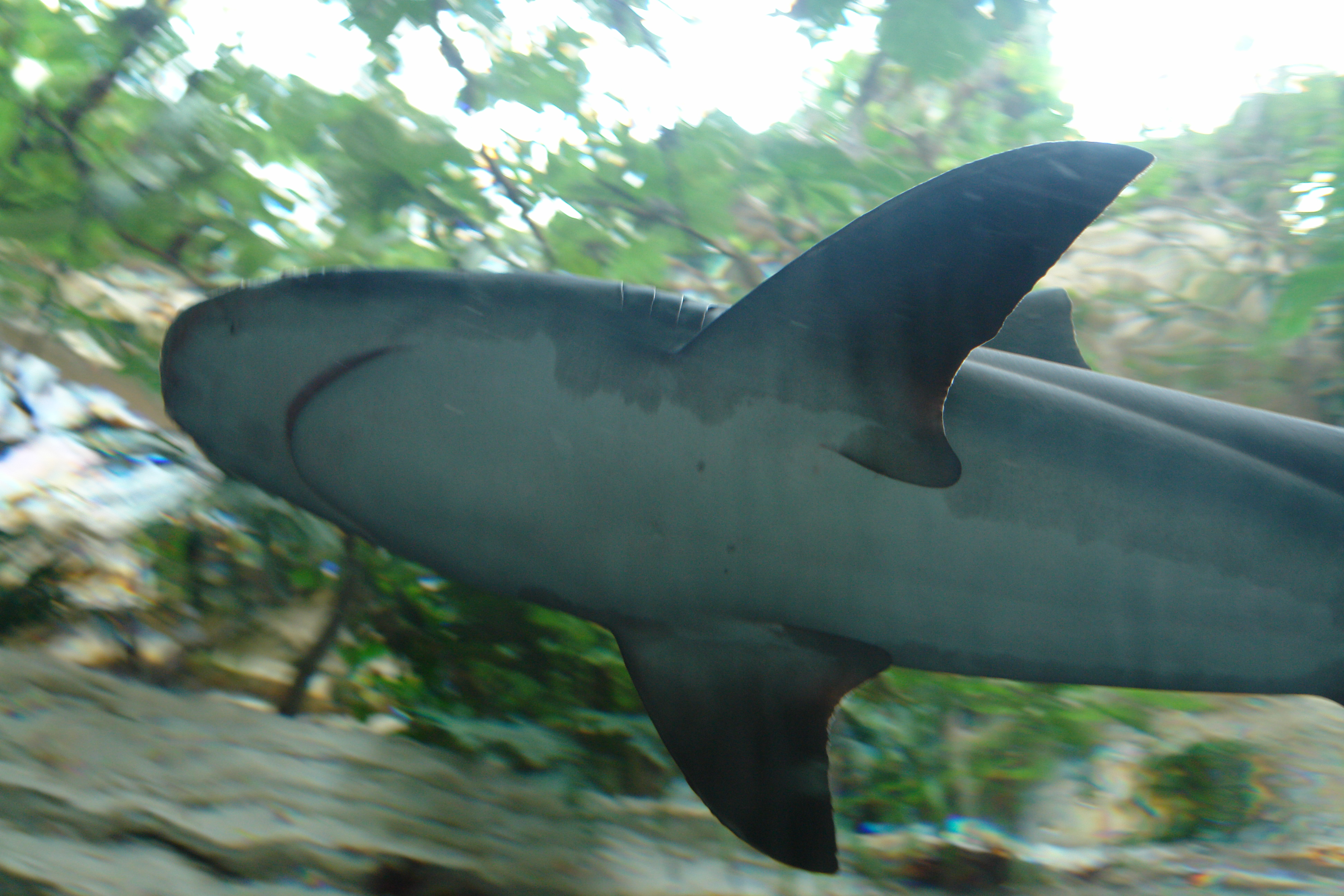
The underside of a shark, taken from an under-tank tunnel

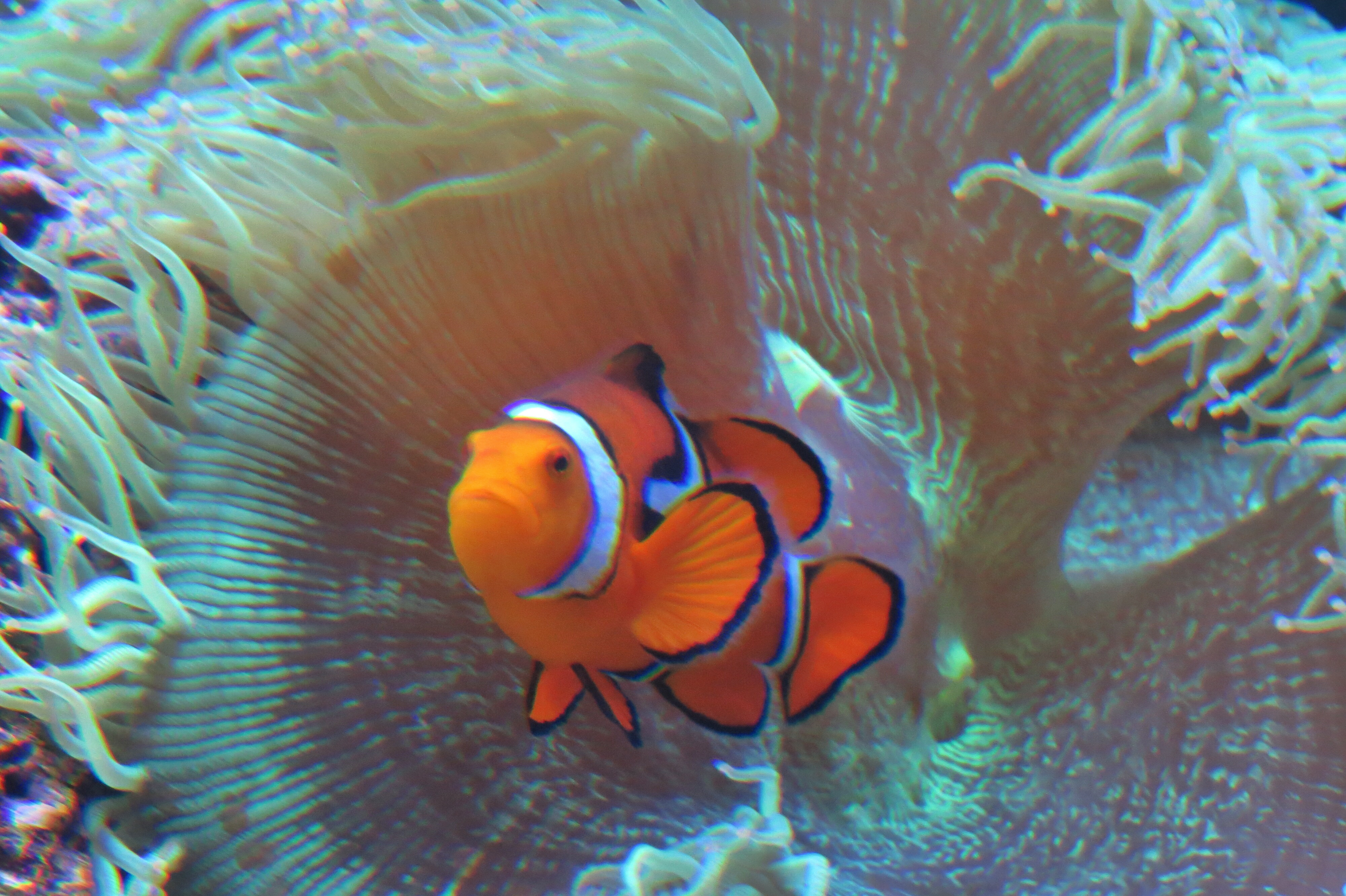

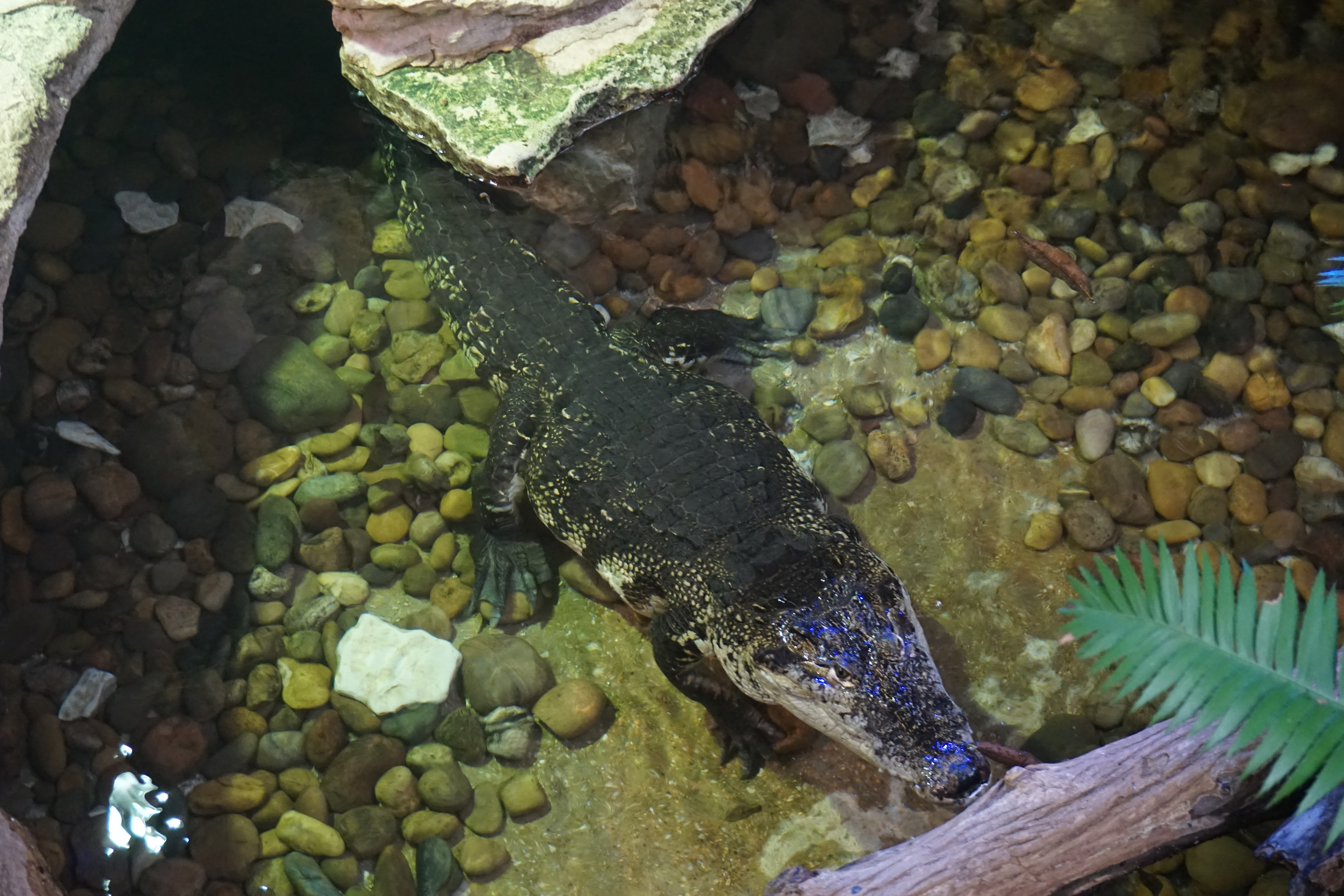
Orinoco crocodile

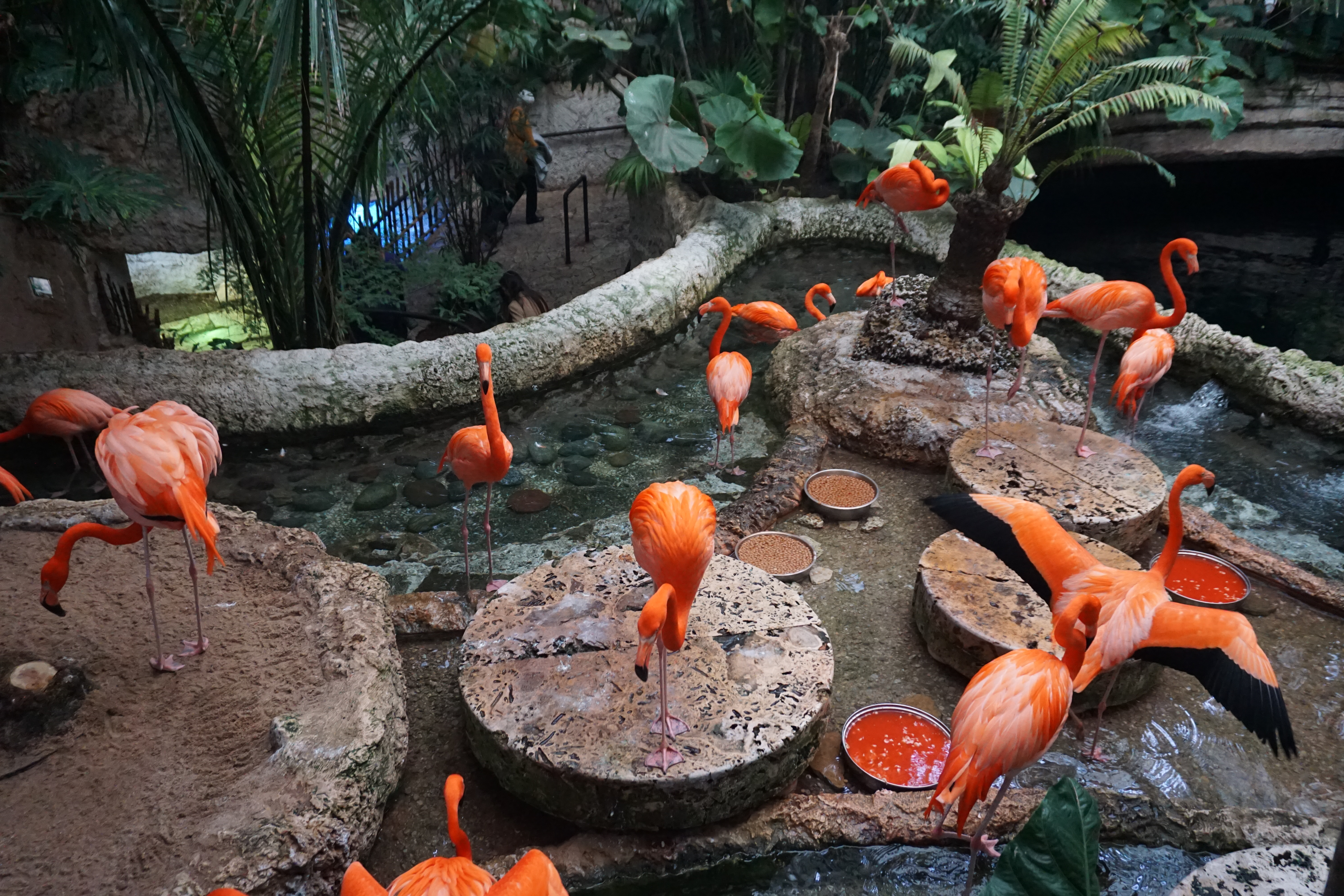
Flamingos

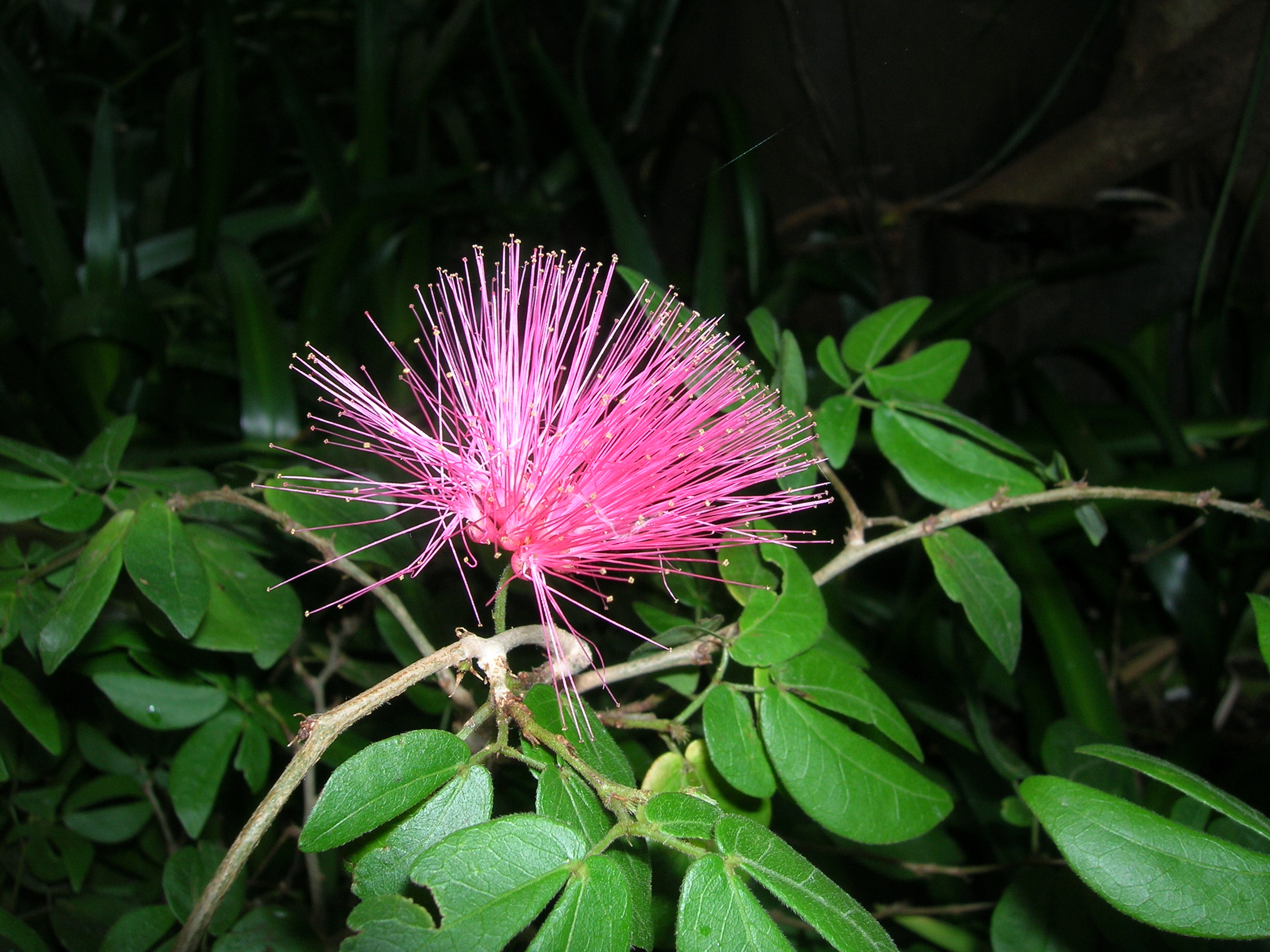
One of the many plant species at the aquarium.
