= Fan Expo Dallas =

Fan convention in the United States

- Status: Active
- Genre: Speculative fiction
- Venue: Plano Centre (2002–2006); Richardson Civic Center (2003–2010); Irving Convention Center at Las Colinas (2011–2013); Kay Bailey Hutchison Convention Center (2014–19, 2021–)
- Locations: Dallas, Texas
- Country: United States
- Inaugurated: October 2002
- Attendance: 50,000 (2014)
- Organizer: Comic Con /Informa Connect
- Website: fanexpodallas.com

Fan Expo Dallas, previously known as Dallas Comic Con (or DCC for short), is a three-day speculative fiction, (including comic books and gaming) fan convention held annually in the Dallas, Texas area. Larger in scale than the Dallas Fan Days events under the same management, Fan Expo Dallas focuses on comic book artists, writers, and publishers. These events usually also feature question and answer sessions, a large dealers room, and autograph-signing with a number of famous comic and media guests. The event is produced by Informa doing business as Fan Expo HQ.

== History ==
In 2002, Ben Stevens, producer of the Sci-Fi Expo (1994–present), and Philip Wise, owner of rebelscum.com and theforce.net, brought on consultant Mark Walters (of the defunct Dallas Fantasy Fair, who had staged the Dallas Comic & Toy Fest from 2000 to 2002) and produced the first Dallas Comic Con. The show attracted 5,000 attendees.

Starting with the October 2012 show, Dallas Comic Con expanded to three days. C2 Ventures sold control of Dallas Comic Con, Sci-Fi Expo, and Fan Days to Informa in early 2014.

There was no expo in 2020, caused by the COVID-19 pandemic.

=== Locations ===
To date, the Dallas Comic Con has been held at one of four locations. The first three locations were in the suburbs of Dallas, Texas. Early editions were held at the Plano Centre in Plano, Texas, or the Richardson Civic Center in Richardson, Texas. Beginning in May 2011, the event relocated to the Irving Convention Center at Las Colinas in Irving, Texas. In May 2014, the Dallas Comic Con relocated to the Kay Bailey Hutchison Convention Center in downtown Dallas. Dallas Fan Days events remain at the Irving Convention Center.

== Event history ==
Dates	Convention Name	Location	Guests	Notes
October 12–13, 2002	Dallas Comic Con	Plano Centre	Dave Dorman, Greg, Tim Hildebrandt, Amanda Conner, Jim Daly, Nick Derington, Richard Dominguez, Ben Dunn, Steve Erwin, Kerry Gammill, Miles Gunter, Michael Lark, Jaime Mendoza, John Lucas, Joseph Michael, Terry Moore, Mark Murphy, Don Punchatz, Kelsey Shannon, Cal Slayton, Kenneth Smith, Dave Stevens, Carrie Fisher, Amy Allen, Rena Owen, Peter Mayhew, Ray Park, David Naughton, Jackson Bostwick, Linda Blair, Joanna Cameron, Brad Dourif, Ben Chapman, Traci Lords, Cynthia Rothrock, Butch Patrick, Glenn Shadix, Richard Hatch	
April 5–6, 2003	Dallas Comic Con	Richardson Civic Center	Tim Bradstreet, Adam Hughes, Dave Dorman, Frank Cho, Scott Kurtz, Kerry Gammill, Cal Slayton, Michael Lark, Zach Jensen, Tanya Roberts, Chase Masterson, Maud Adams, Anne Ramsay, David Carradine	A collectible program book was produced with dual covers by artists Dave Dorman and Adam Hughes. "Celebrity Autograph Series" trading cards featuring Zachariah Jensen were distributed to promote this event. While the card is numbered "Promo 1", the line was dropped due to licensing issues, and this was the only such card issued.
October 25–26, 2003	Dallas Comic Con	Plano Centre	Tim Bradstreet, Phil Noto, Adam Hughes, Scott Kurtz, John Lucas, Ben Dunn, Jaime Mendoza, Cal Slayton, Erik Reeves, Warwick Davis, Anthony Daniels, Dave Prowse, Rena Owen, Michonne Bourriague, Amy Allen, John Rhys-Davies, Sala Baker, David Hedison, Mercedes McNab, Brad Dourif, Jonathan Breck	
October 23–24, 2004	Dallas Comic Con	Plano Centre	Adam Hughes, Michael Lark, Greg Horn, Dan Brereton, Cal Slayton, Michael Jantze, Brent Spiner, Michael Dorn, Orli Shoshan, Iyari Limon, Robia LaMorte, Peter Mayhew, John de Lancie, Kevin Conroy, Arleen Sorkin	A collectible program book was produced with dual covers by artists Adam Hughes and Dan Brereton. Activities at this event included a costume contest and a free screening of the motion picture Saw.
February 12–13, 2005	Dallas Comic Con	Richardson Civic Center.	Bernie Wrightson, Tim Bradstreet, Steve Niles, Mark Brooks, Jaime Mendoza, Scott Kurtz, Todd Nauck, Raven Gregory, Cal Slayton, Brian Denham, Thomas Jane, Patricia Arquette, Sean Astin, David Anders	
October 15–16, 2005	Dallas Comic Con	Plano Centre.	Mark Brooks, Ale Garza, Cliff Chiang, Rich Buckler, Terry Moore, Michael Lark, James O'Barr, Cal Slayton, Kerry Gammill, Jaime Mendoza, Cat Staggs, Cynthia Cummiens, David Hopkins, Ben Dunn, Hector Cantú, Carrie Fisher, Jonathan Frakes, Adam Baldwin, Kevin Sorbo, Peter Mayhew, Erin Gray, Donnie Dunagan, Marc Singer, Kane Hodder, Bill Johnson, Genie Francis, Bonnie Piesse, Keir Dullea, Gary Lockwood, Steve Sansweet, Paul Black, Fanboy Radio.	A collectible program book was produced with dual covers by artists Mark Brooks and Terry Moore.
April 29–30, 2006	Dallas Comic Con	Plano Centre.	Bernie Wrightson, Dave Dorman, Tony Harris, Howard Chaykin, Steve Niles, Norm Breyfogle, James O'Barr, Cal Slayton, Josh Howard, Jaime Mendoza, Tom Hodges, Cat Staggs, Kerry Gammill, Brian Denham, Ben Dunn, Kez Wilson, Jim Daly, David Hopkins, Brock Rizy, Tim Bradstreet, Thomas Jane, Gates McFadden, John Wesley Shipp, Doug Jones, Alan Ruck, Dwight Schultz, Sarah Douglas, Michael Gross, Jeremy Bulloch, James Hampton, Burton Gilliam, Karen Allen	A collectible program book was produced with dual covers by artists Dave Dorman, Tom Hodges, and Cat Staggs.
October 28–29, 2006	Dallas Comic Con	Plano Centre.	Brian Stelfreeze, Phil Noto, Paul Gulacy, Steve Rude, Mike Grell, Ron Frenz, Mark Brooks, Jaime Mendoza, Kerry Gammill, Steve Erwin, Kez Wilson, Tom Hodges, Cat Staggs, Cal Slayton, Ben Dunn, Amy Acker, Ron Glass, Lane Garrison, Jake Lloyd, Claudia Christian, Musetta Vander, Daniel Logan, Mark Goddard, Donnie Dunagan, Captain Lou Albano, Greg "The Hammer" Valentine, Team Brown Family, Team Wild Hanlons	
June 30-July 1, 2007	Dallas Comic Con	Richardson Civic Center	Herb Trimpe, Billy Tan, Bill Willingham, Matthew Sturges, Kristian Donaldson, Brian Denham, Josh Howard, James O'Barr, Ben Dunn, Jamie Mendoza, Steve Irwin, Kez Wilson, Kenneth Smith, Cal Slayton, Hector Cantú, Brad W. Foster, Kristy Swanson, Robert Beltran, Billy West, Mary Oyaya, James Hampton	
January 12–13, 2008	Dallas Comic Con	Richardson Civic Center	Shawnee Smith, Ray Park, Missi Pyle, Tony DeZuniga, Harold LeDoux, Scott Kurtz, Kristian Donaldson, Nick Derington, Kristofer Straub, Cal Slayton, Brad W. Foster, James O'Barr, Bob Layton, Terry Moore, Steve Niles, Cully Hamner, Tim Bradstreet, Matt Sturges, Brian Denham, Sarah Wilkinson, David Hopkins, Jaime Mendoza, Cat Staggs, Scott Harben	
April 5–6, 2008	Dallas Comic Con & Sci-Fi Expo	Richardson Civic Center	Jeremy Bulloch, Kandyse McClure	
October 25–26, 2008	Star Wars Fan Days II	Plano Centre.		
January 2009	Dallas Comic Con	Richardson Civic Center		
August 15–16, 2009	Dallas Comic Con	Richardson Civic Center	Barry Bostwick, Dean Stockwell, James Hampton, Yancy Butler, René Auberjonois, Paul Smith, Steve Niles, Bill Sienkiewicz, J. Scott Campbell, Cal Slayton, Michael Hogan	
January 30–31, 2010	Dallas Comic Con	Richardson Civic Center.	Adam West, Sean Patrick Flanery, Charisma Carpenter, Daniel Cudmore, Peter Mayhew, Anne Lockhart, Herb Jefferson Jr., Tim Sale, Adam Hughes, Todd Nauck, Brad W. Foster, Ben Dunn, Michael Golden, Harold LeDoux, Cal Slayton	Harold LeDoux at the Dallas Comic Con in Richardson, Texas (January 30, 2010)
August 28–29, 2010	Dallas Comic Con	Richardson Civic Center	Edward James Olmos, Luciana Carro, Alan Harris, Mike Edmonds, Lar Park Lincoln, Machete, Keith Pollard, Adam Warren, Angel Medina, Pat Broderick, June Brigman, Roy Richardson, Kerry Gammill, Kez Wilson, Ben Dunn, Josh Howard, Joe Eisma, Steve Erwin, John Lucas, Brian Denham, Andre Mangum, David Hopkins, Cal Slayton, Richard Dominguez, Lawrence Reynolds, Anthony Tollin	
May 21–22, 2011	Dallas Comic Con	Irving Convention Center at Las Colinas	Leonard Nimoy, Carrie Fisher, Amanda Pays, John Wesley Shipp, Alexis Cruz, Thomas Jane, Todd Farmer, The Walking Dead, Stan Lee, John Romita Jr., Amanda Conner, Jimmy Palmiotti, Cal Slayton, Bernie Wrightson, Steve Niles, Tim Bradstreet, Rick Leonardi, Kerry Gammill, Todd Nauck, James O'Barr, Michael Lark.	
May 19–20, 2012	Stan Lee Presents Dallas Comic Con	Irving Convention Center at Las Colinas	Stan Lee, Neal Adams, George Pérez, Len Wein, Arthur Suydam, Jimmy Palmiotti, Cully Hamner, Brian Stelfreeze, Norm Breyfogle, Greg Horn, Mitch Breitweiser, Elizabeth Breitweiser, Alex Saviuk, Sam DeLarosa, Guo Jingxiong, Steve Erwin, Cal Slayton, Kristian Donaldson, Patrick Stewart, John de Lancie, David Prowse, Jeremy Bulloch, Peter Mayhew, Adam West, Kevin Conroy, Burt Ward, Laura Vandervoort, Summer Glau, James Marsters, Anne Lockhart, Tim Taylor	DCC logo used from 2012 until 2016 rebranding. Organizers estimated the total attendance at 20,000 for the weekend.
October 19–21, 2012,	Dallas Fan Days	Irving Convention Center at Las Colinas	Stan Lee, Bruce Campbell, Robert Englund, Tom Felton, Sean Astin	
May 17–19, 2013	Dallas Comic Con	Irving Convention Center at Las Colinas		
October 4–6, 2013	Dallas Fan Days	Irving Convention Center at Las Colinas	John Barrowman, Simon Bisley, John Heder	
May 16–18, 2014	Dallas Comic Con	Kay Bailey Hutchison Convention Center	Nathan Fillion, William Shatner, Akira Takarada, Christopher Lloyd, Nightmare on Elm Street, Stan Lee, Amanda Conner, Jimmy Palmiotti, David Finch, Mark Bagley, J. Scott Campbell, Dan Slott, Nathan Fillion, Summer Glau, Adam Baldwin, Ron Glass, Sean Maher, Gina Torres, Jewel Staite, Jonathan Frakes, Brent Spiner, Marina Sirtis, LeVar Burton, Michael Dorn, John de Lancie, Denise Crosby, David Morrissey, Emily Kinney, Michael Rooker	First convention under the new ownership.
October 17–19, 2014	Dallas Fan Days	Irving Convention Center at Las Colinas		
February 7–8, 2015	Dallas Fan Days	Irving Convention Center at Las Colinas		
May 29–31, 2015	Fan Expo Presents Dallas Comic Con	Kay Bailey Hutchison Convention Center	Robin Lord Taylor, Carrie Fisher, Karen Gillan, Nathan Fillion, Alan Tudyk, Adam West, Burt Ward, Dean Cain, Laura Vandervoort, Barbara Eden, Bill Daily, Haruo Nakajima, Kenpachiro Satsuma, Tsutomu Kitagawa, Stan Lee, Amanda Conner, Alex Maleev, Esad Ribić, Kaare Andrews, Greg Pak, Steve Epting, Jimmy Palmiotti, Bob Layton	
October 16–18, 2015	Dallas Fan Days	Irving Convention Center at Las Colinas		
February 13–14, 2016	Dallas Fan Days	Irving Convention Center at Las Colinas	Neal Adams, John Barrowman, Becky Cloonan, Sam de la Rosa, Bruce Greenwood, Brent Spiner, Austin St. John	
June 3–5, 2016	Fan Expo Dallas	Kay Bailey Hutchison Convention Center	Stan Lee, Kevin Smith, Jason Mewes, Doctor Who, Agent Carter, Jon Bernthal, Rob Schneider, Jack Gleeson	First convention under the new branding. Attendees reached a total of over 100,000.
October 14–16, 2016	Dallas Fan Days	Irving Convention Center at Las Colinas	Neal Adams, Brett Dalton, Sam de la Rosa, John de Lancie, Michael Dorn, Ben Dunn, Elizabeth Henstridge, Scott Wilson	
March 31–April 2, 2017	Fan Expo Dallas	Kay Bailey Hutchison Convention Center	Mark Hamill, Stan Lee, Tim Curry, John Barrowman, Alan Tudyk, Jason Isaacs, Catherine Tate, Jason David Frank, Thomas F. Wilson, Alex Kingston, Meat Loaf, Barry Bostwick, Charisma Carpenter, Jim Lee, Mike Zeck, Ian Somerhalder, Adam West, Burt Ward	Adam West and Burt Ward's final appearance together. This was also Stan Lee's final Texas convention appearance.
October 20–22, 2017	Dallas Fan Days	Irving Convention Center at Las Colinas	Bruce Boxleitner, Sam de la Rosa, Michael Golden, Austin St. John, Arthur Suydam, David Tennant, Renée Witterstaetter	
April 6–8, 2018	Fan Expo Dallas	Kay Bailey Hutchison Convention Center	Ben Affleck, Jason Momoa, Jeff Goldblum, Chuck Norris, Tom Cavanagh, Val Kilmer, Cary Elwes, Wallace Shawn, Chris Sarandon, Christopher Lloyd, Amy Jo Johnson, Richard Dean Anderson, Eliza Taylor, Anthony Daniels, Billy Dee Williams, Paul Reubens	
October 19–21, 2018	Dallas Fan Days	Irving Convention Center at Las Colinas	Manu Bennett, Arthur Darvill, Sam de la Rosa, Dave Dorman, David Doub, Jason David Frank, Ray Park, Christopher Sabat, Kevin Sorbo, Karl Urban	
May 3–5, 2019	Fan Expo Dallas	Kay Bailey Hutchison Convention Center	Lynda Carter, Michael J. Fox, Christopher Lloyd, Lea Thompson, Tom Wilson, James Tolkan, Charlie Hunnam, Zachary Levi, William Shatner, Linda Blair, Rainn Wilson, Pamela Anderson, Kiefer Sutherland, Sean Astin, Peter Mayhew (Died before convention), Ke Huy Quan, Corey Feldman, Jason Patric, Ralph Macchio, Martin Kove, William Zabka, Finn Wolfhard, Jake Dylan Grazer, Wyatt Oleff, Chosen Jacobs, John Barrowman, Carlos Valdes, Danielle Panabaker, Rose McIver, Tyler Hoechlin, Summer Glau, Jaeden Lieberher, Jackson Robert Scott, Jeremy Ray Taylor, Mia Farrow, Rider Strong, Danielle Fishel, Will Friedle, Ben Savage, Kristin Kreuk, Michael Rosenbaum, Tom Welling, Mark Sheppard, Lana Parrilla, Ryan Hurst, Khary Payton, Mike Colter, Phil Lamarr, Bryce Papenbrook, Cristina Vee, David Hayter, Patricia Summersett, Chris Sabat, Justine Briner, Clifford Chapin, Colleen Clinkenbeard, Luci Christian, Caitline Glass, Josh Grelle, David Matranga, Joel McDonald, Brina Palencia, Kyle Phillips, Vanessa Marshall, Sean Schemmel, Peter Cullen, Frank Welker, Lucie Pohl, Gaku Space, Estelle, Zach Callison, Michaela Dietz, Deedee Magno, Greg Cipes, Tara Strong, Will Friedle	
October 18–20, 2019	Dallas Fan Days	Irving Convention Center at Las Colinas	Ron Perlman, Anthony Daniels, Adam Baldwin, Matthew Modine, Patrick Warburton, Edward James Olmos, Mary McDonnell, Tommy Flanagan, Anson Mount, Ethan Peck, Casey Cott	
~~June 19–21, 2020~~	Fan Expo Dallas	Kay Bailey Hutchison Convention Center	(announced) Matthew Lewis, Bonnie Wright, James and Oliver Phelps, John Cleese, George Takei, Levar Burton, Stephen Amell, Katherine McNamara, Ben Lewis, Caity Lotz, Brandon Routh, Dave Bautista, Alicia Silverstone, Dean Cain, Brendan Fraser, Bob Saget, John Stamos, Dave Coulier, Christina Ricci, Devon Sawa, Jon Bernthal, John Leguizamo, Mark-Paul Gosselaar, Mario Lopez, Elizabeth Berkley, Neve Campbell, Rose McGowan, Jamie Kennedy, Matthew Lillard, Elijah Wood, Sean Astin, Dominic Monaghan, Billy Boyd, Giancarlo Esposito, Weird Al Yankovic, Chandler Riggs, Garret Dillahunt, Christopher Eccleston, Catherine Tate, Annabeth Gish, Sonequa Martin-Green, Felicia Day, Leslie David Baker, Brian Baumgartner, Oscar Nuñez	Postponed and then canceled due to the COVID-19 pandemic. Initially planned to be held March 27–29, 2020.
~~October 16–18, 2020~~	Dallas Fan Days	Irving Convention Center at Las Colinas	Cancelled due to the COVID-19 pandemic.	
September 17–19, 2021	Fan Expo Dallas	Kay Bailey Hutchison Convention Center	Watson Amelia, Stephen Amell, Sean Astin (canceled), Brian Azzarello (canceled), Eric Basaldua, Dante Basco, Brian Baumgartner (canceled), Dave Bautista (canceled), Billy Boyd (canceled), Justin Briner, Rodger Bumpass, Greg Capullo (canceled), Clifford Chapin, Luci Christian, Colleen Clinkenbeard, Kevin Conroy, Christina Dark, Sam de la Rosa, David Doub, Steve Downes (canceled), Christopher Eccleston, Ray Fisher, Kate Flannery, Brendan Fraser (canceled), Michael Golden (canceled), Mark-Paul Gosselaar, Mike Grell, Josh Grelle, Gawr Gura, Anthony Michael Hall (canceled), Chad Hardin, Tony Harris, Colton Haynes, Greg Horn, Ryan Hurst, Melanie Jasmine, Georges Jeanty, Jillea, Wayne Knight (canceled), David Koechner, Walter Koenig, Jae Lee, Zachary Levi, Matthew Lewis, Mario Lopez (canceled), LuckyGrim, James Marsters, Charles Martinet, David Matranga, Gates McFadden (canceled), Kristen McGuire, Brandon McInnis, Bob McLeod, Breckin Meyer (canceled), Dominic Monaghan (canceled), Rags Morales, Mori Calliope, Paul Nakauchi (cancelled), Nana Cosplay, Trina Nishimura, Nolan North, Oscar Nuñez, Brina Palencia, Dan Parent, Robert Patrick, Ron Perlman, Kyle Phillips, Billie Piper (canceled), Podgekinn, Andy Price, Zachary Quinto, Humberto Ramos, Monica Rial, Tone Rodriguez, Theo Rossi, Tim Rozon, Joe Rubinstein, Chris Sabat, Adam Savage, Melanie Scrofano, Jeremy Shada, William Shatner, Ian Sinclair, Sparrowhawk Cosplay, Brent Spiner (canceled), George Takei, J. Michael Tatum, Veronica Taylor, Vraskaa, Carl Weathers, Christopher Wehkamp, Billy West, Elijah Wood (canceled), Claude Xavier	Return of the event, following the previous cancellations due to the COVID-19 pandemic.
December 11, 2021	Dallas Fan Festival	Irving Convention Center at Las Colinas		Its name was changed from Dallas Fan Days to Dallas Fan Festival.
June 17–19, 2022	Fan Expo Dallas	Kay Bailey Hutchison Convention Center		
June 9–11, 2023	Fan Expo Dallas	Kay Bailey Hutchison Convention Center	Beverly D'Angelo, Carrie-Anne Moss, Charles Martinet, Charlie Cox, Chevy Chase, Colleen Clinkenbeard, Creed Bratton, Danielle Panabaker, Dee Bradley Baker, Grace Van Dien, Hayden Christensen, Jason Lee, Jason Mewes, Jeff Anderson, Jodi Benson, Jon Bernthal, Joseph Quinn, Kevin Smith, Leslie David Baker, Rainn Wilson, Ralph Macchio, Paul Walter Hauser, Randy Quaid, Rosario Dawson, Sean Gunn, Shameik Moore, Steve Burns, Tara Strong, Trevor Fehrman, Vincent D'Onofrio, Zachary Levi	
June 7-9, 2024	Fan Expo Dallas	Kay Bailey Hutchison Convention Center	Adam Savage, Alan Tudyk, Alex Kingston, Billie Piper, Butch Hartman, Caleb McLaughlin, Catherine Tate, Chris Sarandon, Colleen Clinkenbeard, Dallas Liu, Danny Elfman, David Tennant, Don Bluth, Elizabeth Yu, Emily Swallow, Finn Wolfhard, Frank Welker, Gaten Matarazzo, Geena Davis, Giancarlo Esposito, Gordon Cormier, Hayden Panettiere, Helen Hunt, Henry Winkler, Holly Marie Combs, Hugh Dancy, Ian Ousley, Jodie Whittaker, Joonas Suotamo, Keith David, Mads Mikkelsen, Mandip Gill, Maria Zhang, Marisa Tomei, Mckenna Grace, Ming-Na Wen, Morena Baccarin, Natasha Liu Bordizzo, Patrick Warburton, Peter Cullen, Richard Dreyfuss, Roger Craig Smith, Rose McGowan, Sam Raimi, Shannen Doherty, Sofia Boutella, Susan Sarandon, Temuera Morrison, Tim Curry, William Shatner	
October 19-20, 2024	Dallas Fan Festival	Irving Convention Center at Las Colinas	Bitsie Tulloch, Brandon Routh, Caity Lotz, Candice Patton, Carlos Valdes, Danielle Panabaker, David Ramsey, Dean Cain, George Newbern, Grant Gustin, John Wesley Shipp, Manny Jacinto, Michael Cudlitz, Tim Daly, Tom Cavanagh, Tyler Hoechlin, Willa Holland	
May 30-June 1, 2025	Fan Expo Dallas	Kay Bailey Hutchison Convention Center	John Cena, Mr. T, Michael J. Fox, Christopher Lloyd, Lea Thompson, Tom Wilson, Huey Lewis, Claudia Wells, Elisabeth Shue, James Tolkan, Harry Waters Jr., Donald Fullilove, Frances Lee McCain, Jeffrey Weissman, Matt Clark, Orlando Bloom, John Rhys-Davies, Tom Welling, Michael Rosenbaum, Erica Durance, Laura Vandervoort, Gabriel Iglesias, Anthony Daniels, John Boyega, Ashley Eckstein, Christina Ricci, Emily Deschanel, David Boreanaz, James Marsters, Julie Benz, Seth Green, Matthew Senreich, Breckin Meyer, Heather Graham, Zachary Levi, Parker Posey, Jennifer Beals, Kristen Schaal, Heather Locklear, Rob Schneider, Priscilla Presley, Christopher Mintz-Plasse, Garrett Hedlund, Frank Grillo, Stephen Amell, David Ramsey, Felicia Day, Dirk Benedict, Keith David, Zach Tyler Eisen, Jack DeSena, Dante Basco, Michaela Jill Murphy, Greg Baldwin, Hank Azaria, Kate Micucci	

== See also ==
- Dallas Fantasy Fair
