= Amy Allen (disambiguation) =

Amy Allen (born 1992) is an American songwriter.

Amy Allen may also refer to:

- Amy Allen (philosopher) (born 1970), American philosopher
- Amy Allen (actress) (born 1976), American actress
- Amy Allen, Australian swimmer in the 2010 Oceania Swimming Championships
- Amy Allen, a character in The A-Team
- Amy Allen, a superhero known as Bombshell (DC Comics)

== See also ==
- Aimee Allen (born 1982), American singer-songwriter
