= Irving Convention Center at Las Colinas =

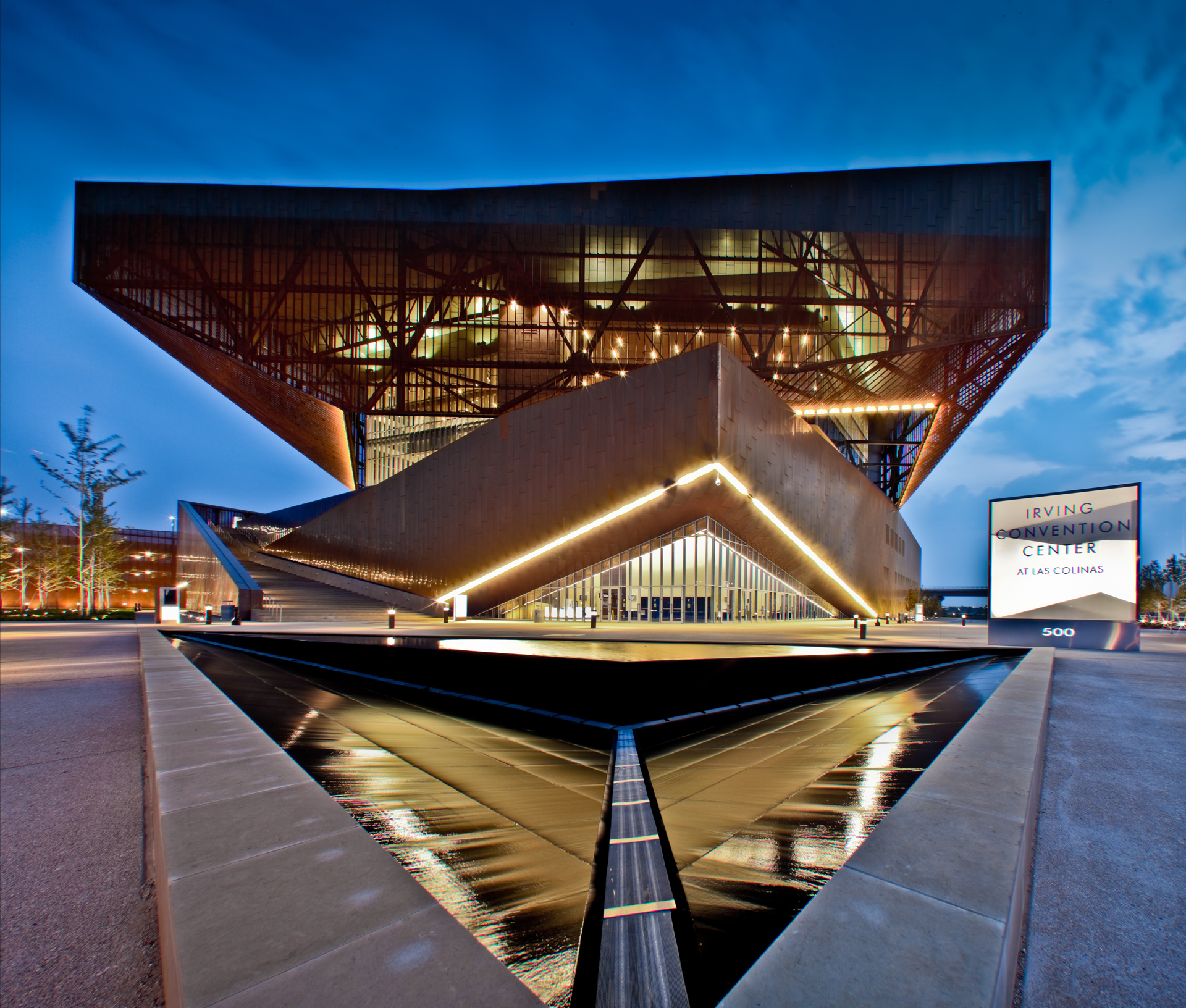
- Exterior
- Interactive map of Irving Convention Center at Las Colinas
- Address: 500 West Las Colinas Blvd. Irving, Texas 75039
- Coordinates: 32°52′41″N 96°56′35″W
- Owner: City of Irving Government (Irving Convention and Visitors Bureau)
- Operator: ASM Global
- Public transit: Irving Convention Center (DART station)

Construction
- Opened: January 2011

Website
- irvingconventioncenter.com

The Irving Convention Center is a 275,000 sq ft (25,500 m^{2}) facility on a 40 acres (16 ha) tract in Las Colinas Urban Center in Irving, Texas. Opened in January 2011, the convention center and the adjoining mixed use entertainment district are bordered on the west by Highway 114, on the east by Las Colinas Boulevard, on the north by Spur 348/Northwest Highway, and to the south by Fuller Drive. The building is recognized for its unique architecture and vertical design.

== Facility ==
The facility is designed to serve exhibition, conventions, and meetings and other events with the focus primarily on groups of 800 to 1,200 people with a capacity of 4,000 for a general session. The building consists of several levels with an adjacent parking garage. The first floor contains the 50,000 sq ft (4,600 m^{2}) column-free exhibition hall that spans approximately two and half stories in height and includes the main lobby. The second level contains 20 breakout rooms totaling 20,000 sq ft (1,900 m^{2}) as well as the atrium café which extends to an outdoor, shaded terrace. The third level consists of the 20,000 sq ft (1,900 m^{2}) ballroom with pre-function and breakout areas.

To avoid the traditional convention center appearance and use as much natural light as possible, the Irving Convention Center is designed as two boxes, stacked and rotated to create cantilevered corners that provide several shaded outdoor areas for visitors. The majority of the building is surrounded in glass for natural light and curtained with a perforated copper façade that will age to a natural copper patina for both a unique appearance and to reduce the consumption of energy. The facility has received a LEED Silver certification.

| Column Free Exhibit Hall | Ballroom | Breakout Rooms | Total Lease Space | Gross Square Footage |
|---|---|---|---|---|
| 50,000 sq ft (4,600 m^{2}) | 20,000 sq ft (1,900 m^{2}) | 20,000 sq ft (1,900 m^{2}) | 90,000 sq ft (8,400 m^{2}) | 275,000 sq ft (25,500 m^{2}) |

== Project team ==
- Owner: City of Irving/Irving Convention and Visitors Bureau
- Owner's Project Manager: Beck Group
- Architect: RMJM Hillier Architecture
- Construction Manager: Austin Commercial
- Structural Engineer: Datum Engineers
- MEP Engineer: Vanderweil
- Civil Engineer: Jacobs Carter Burgess
- Operators: ASM Global
- Copper Cladding: Zahner

== Adjoining venues ==
The Westin Irving Convention Center Hotel at Las Colinas opened in 2019 as the official hotel for the Irving Convention Center. The hotel has 350 rooms and a Mexican restaurant. In addition to meeting space at the Convention Center, the hotel offers 30,000 square feet of flexible indoor and outdoor space including two ballrooms, two boardrooms, a 10,000-square-foot outdoor lawn and event space by the pool.

The Toyota Music Factory offers concerts and the Alamo Drafthouse Cinema offers movies at the site. The Toyota Music Factory venue converts from a 2,500 to a 4,000 capacity indoor theater and opens up to an 8,000-person capacity open-air pavilion. The Pavilion at Toyota Music Factory hosts a variety of restaurants and entertainment throughout the year exclusively booked and promoted by Live Nation Entertainment.

== Transit ==
A Dallas Area Rapid Transit Orange Line light rail station near the site serves the Convention Center and the surrounding Las Colinas area. The Irving Convention Center station provides connections to DFW International Airport and also Dallas Love Field (via the Green Line). A multi-level parking garage provides parking for 800 cars.

== Gallery ==
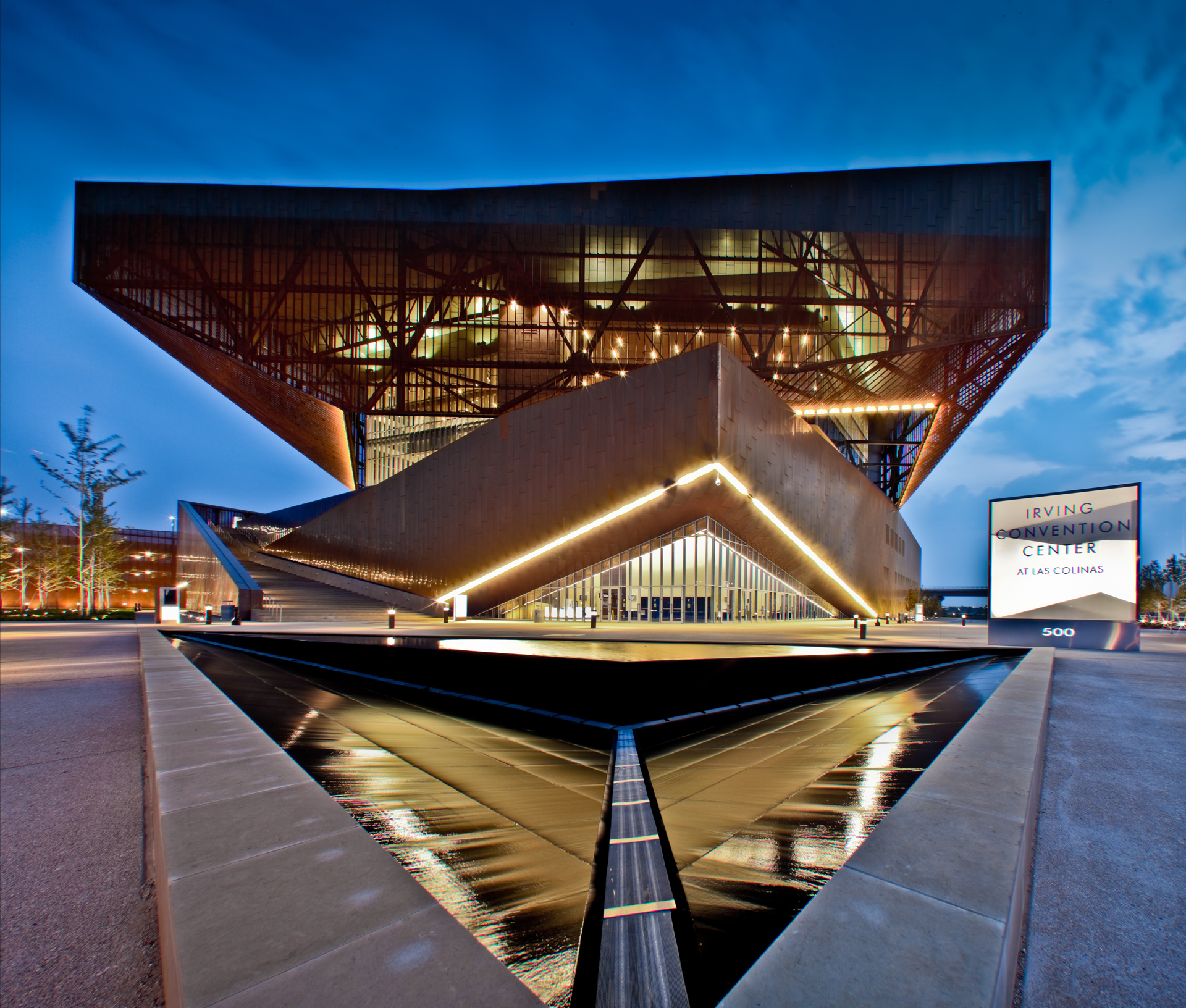
Outside Irving Convention Center

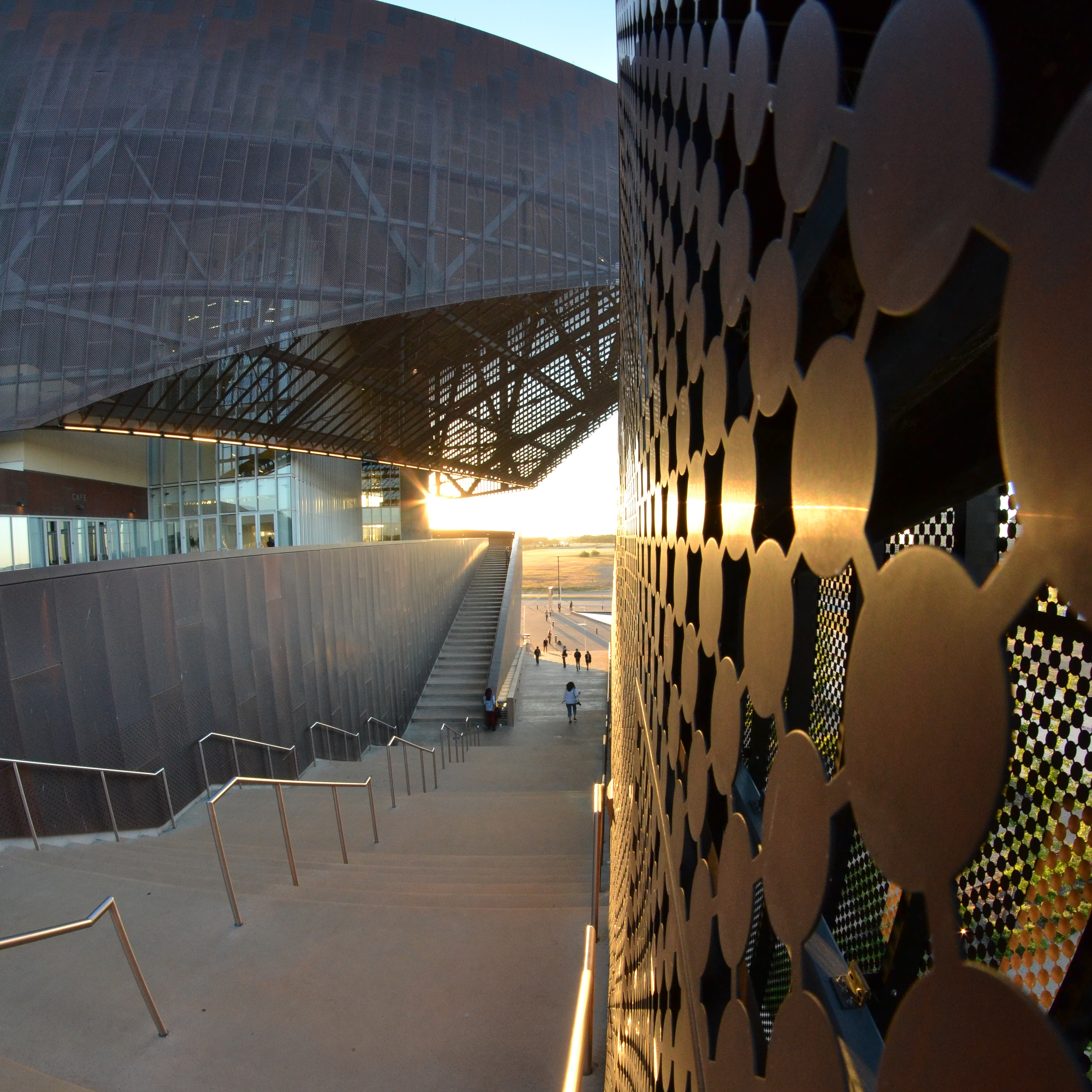
Grand Staircase

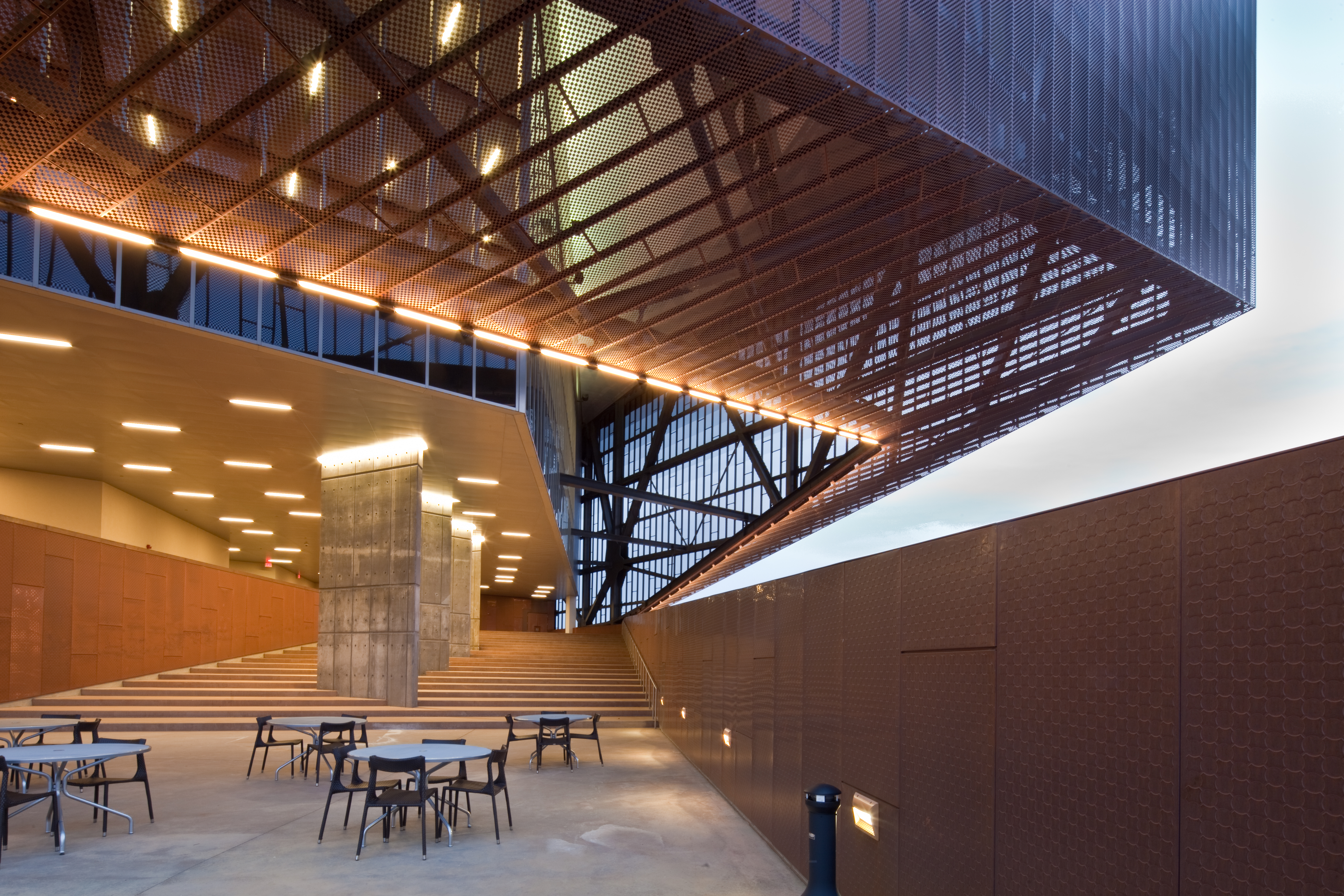
Out function space

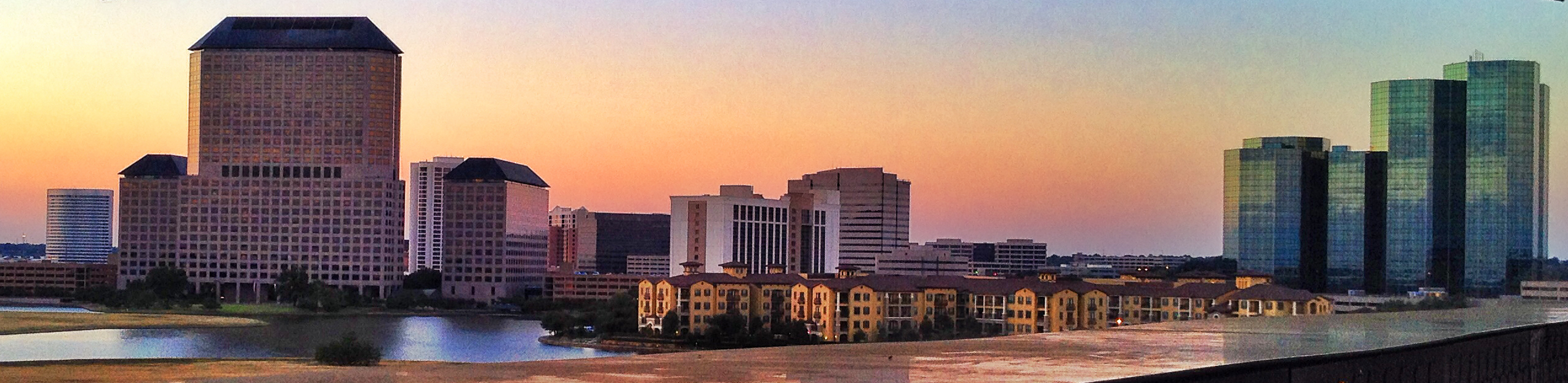
View of Las Colinas

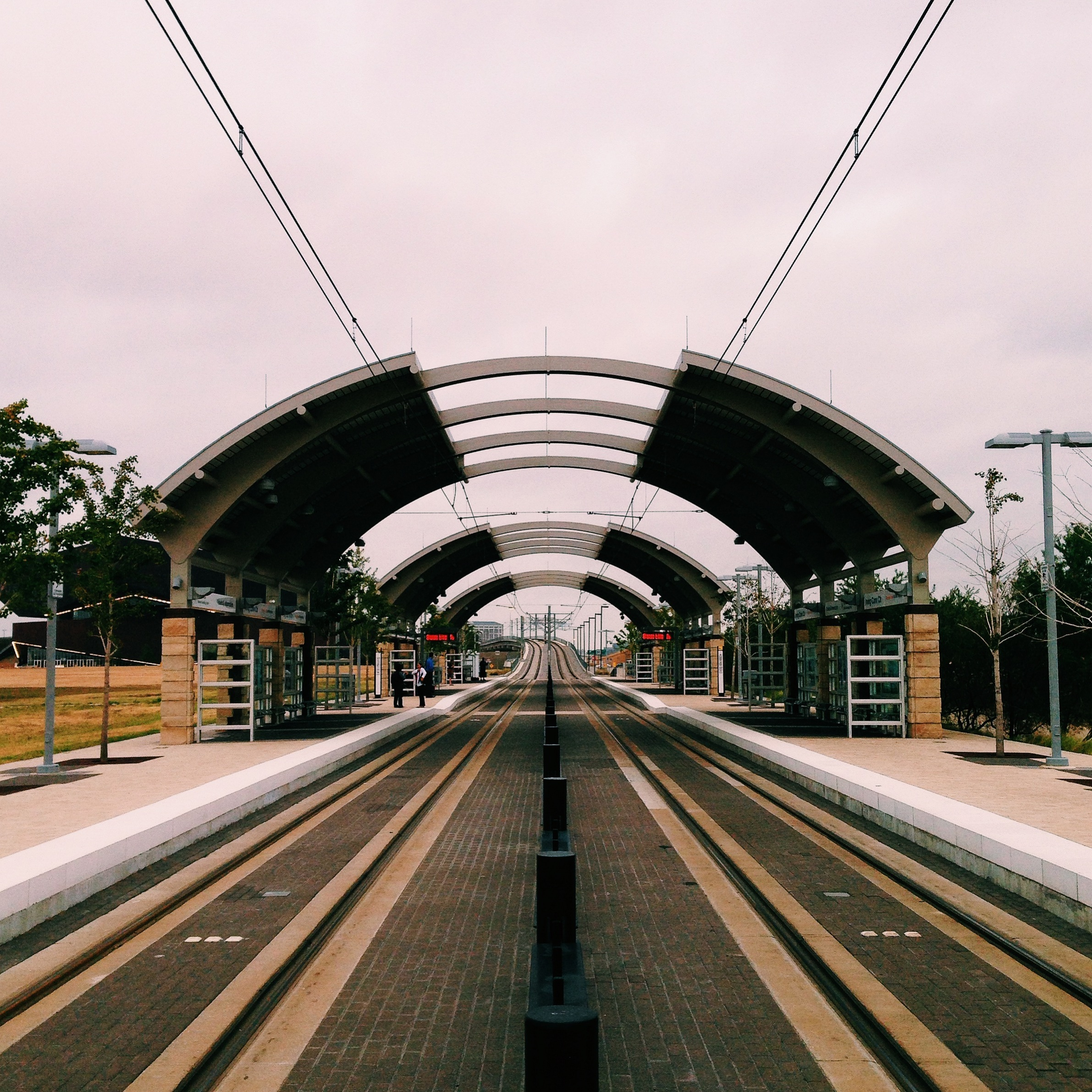
Dart Station

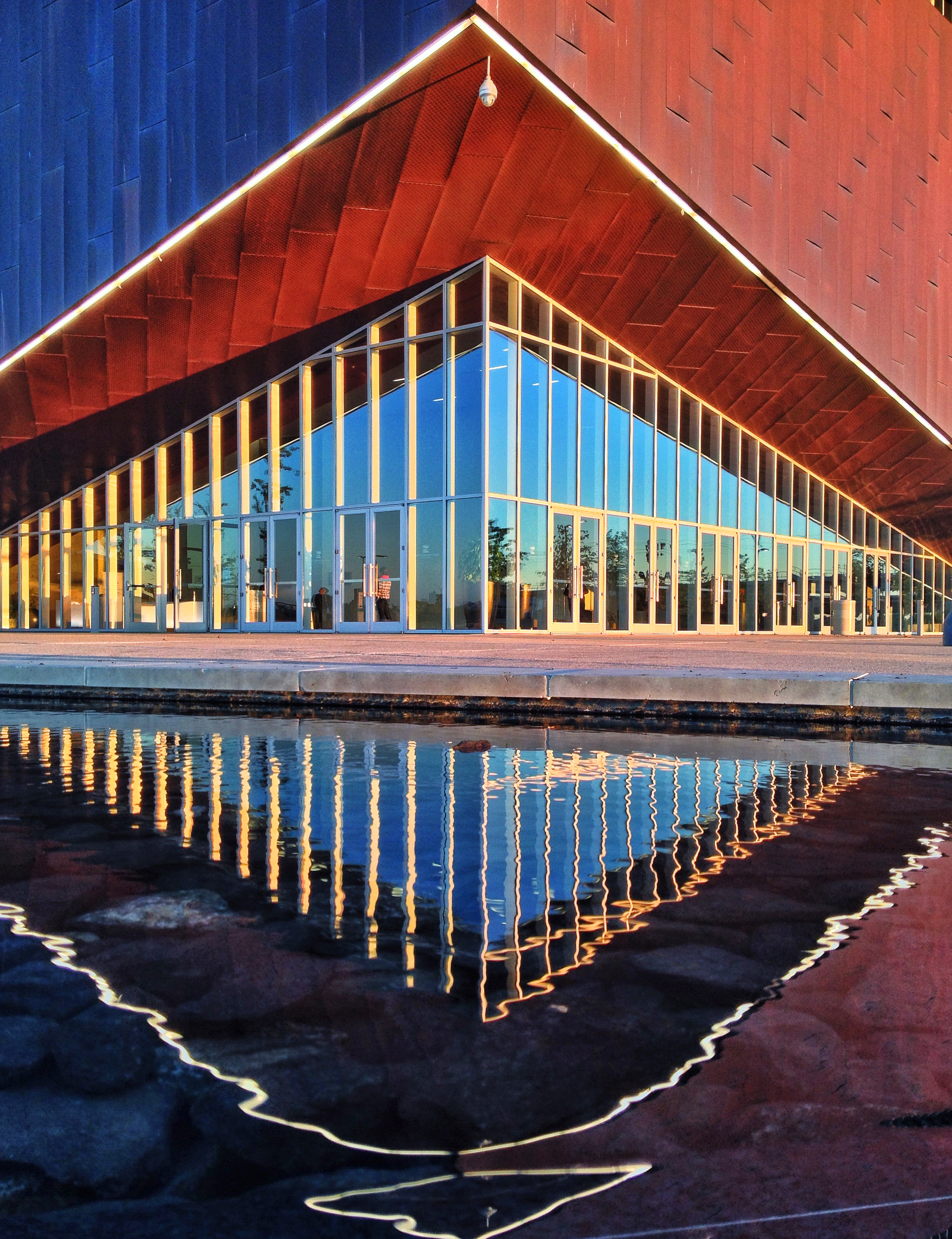
Water Fountain

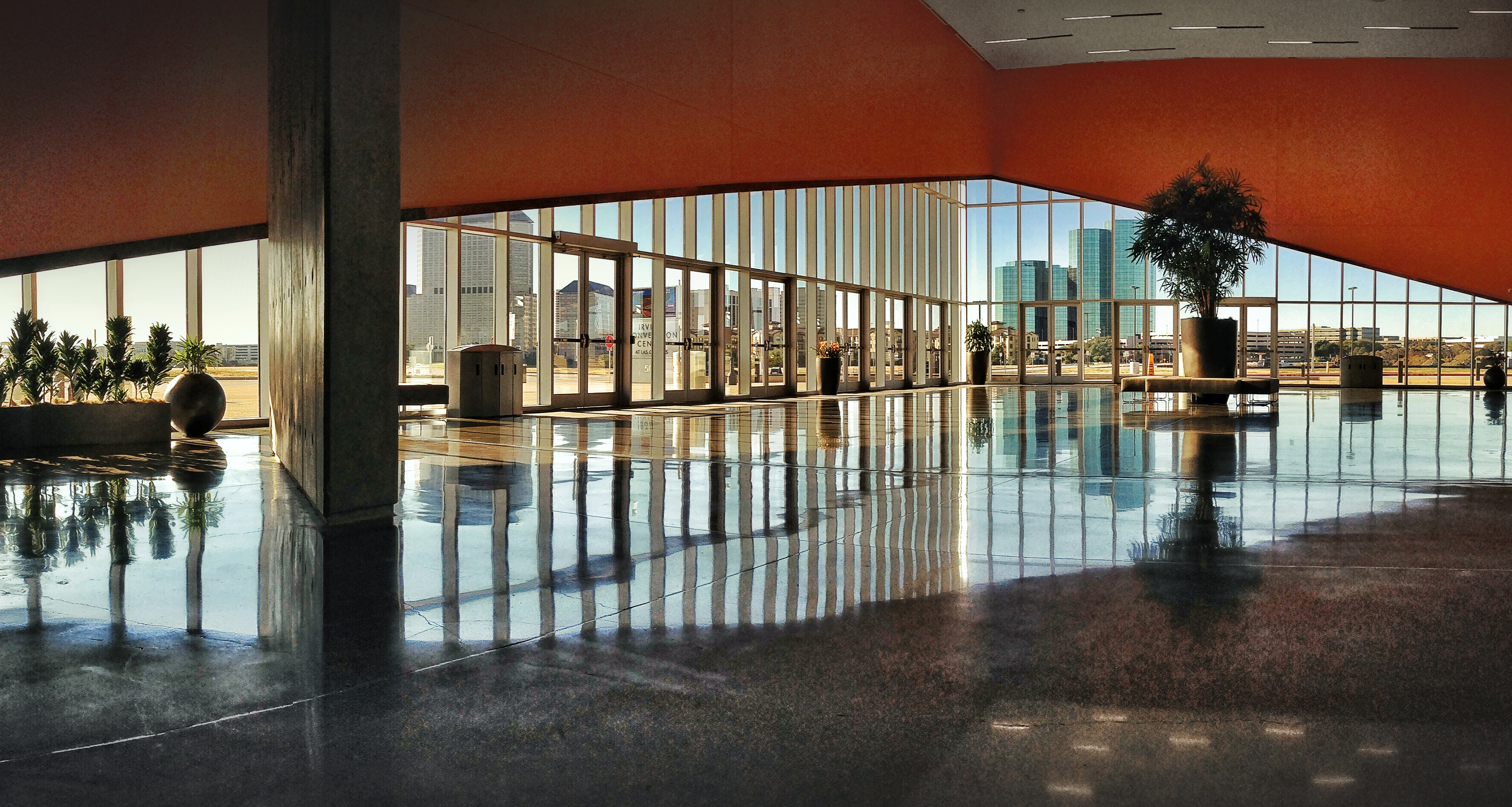
Lobby Pano

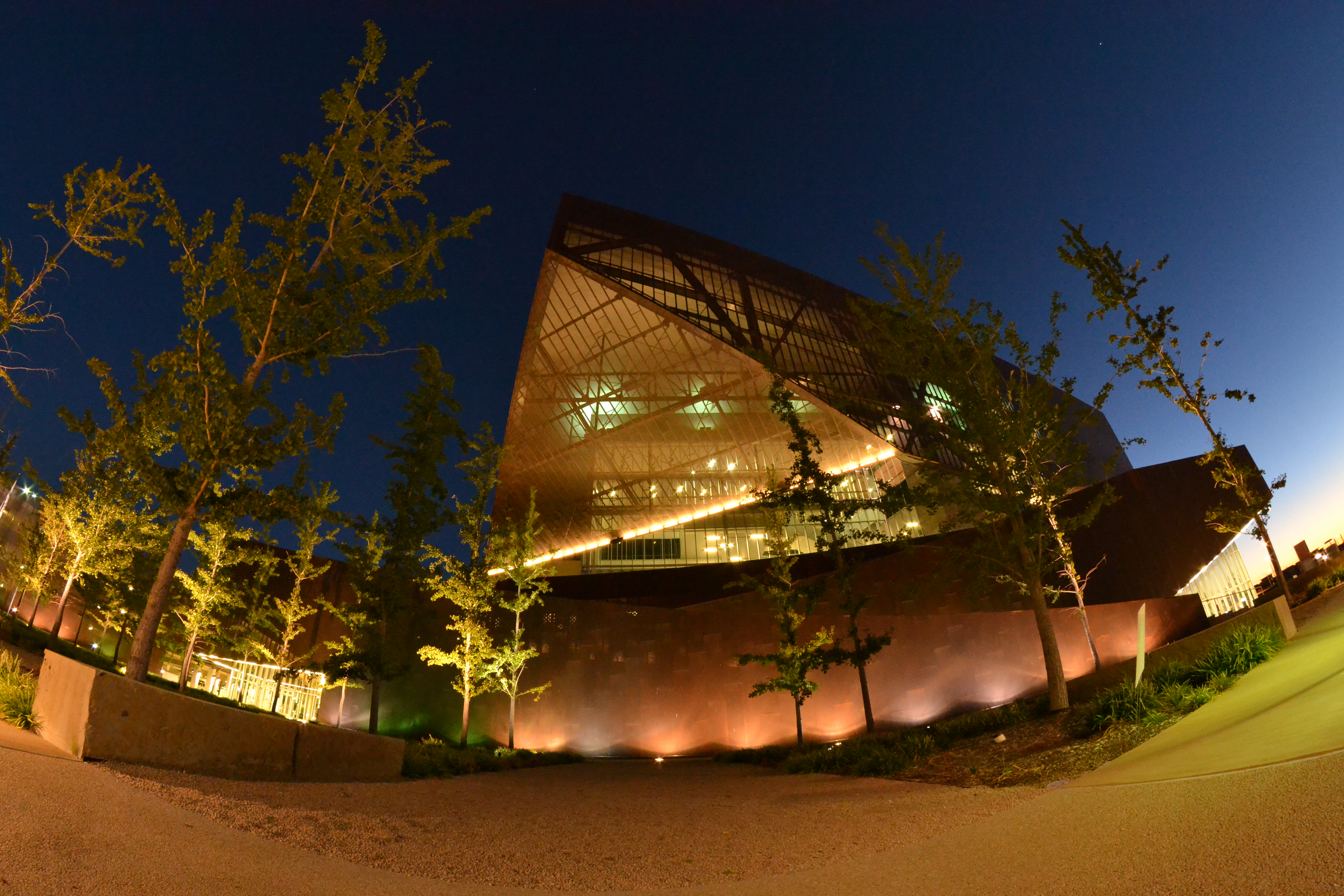
Exterior at Sunrise

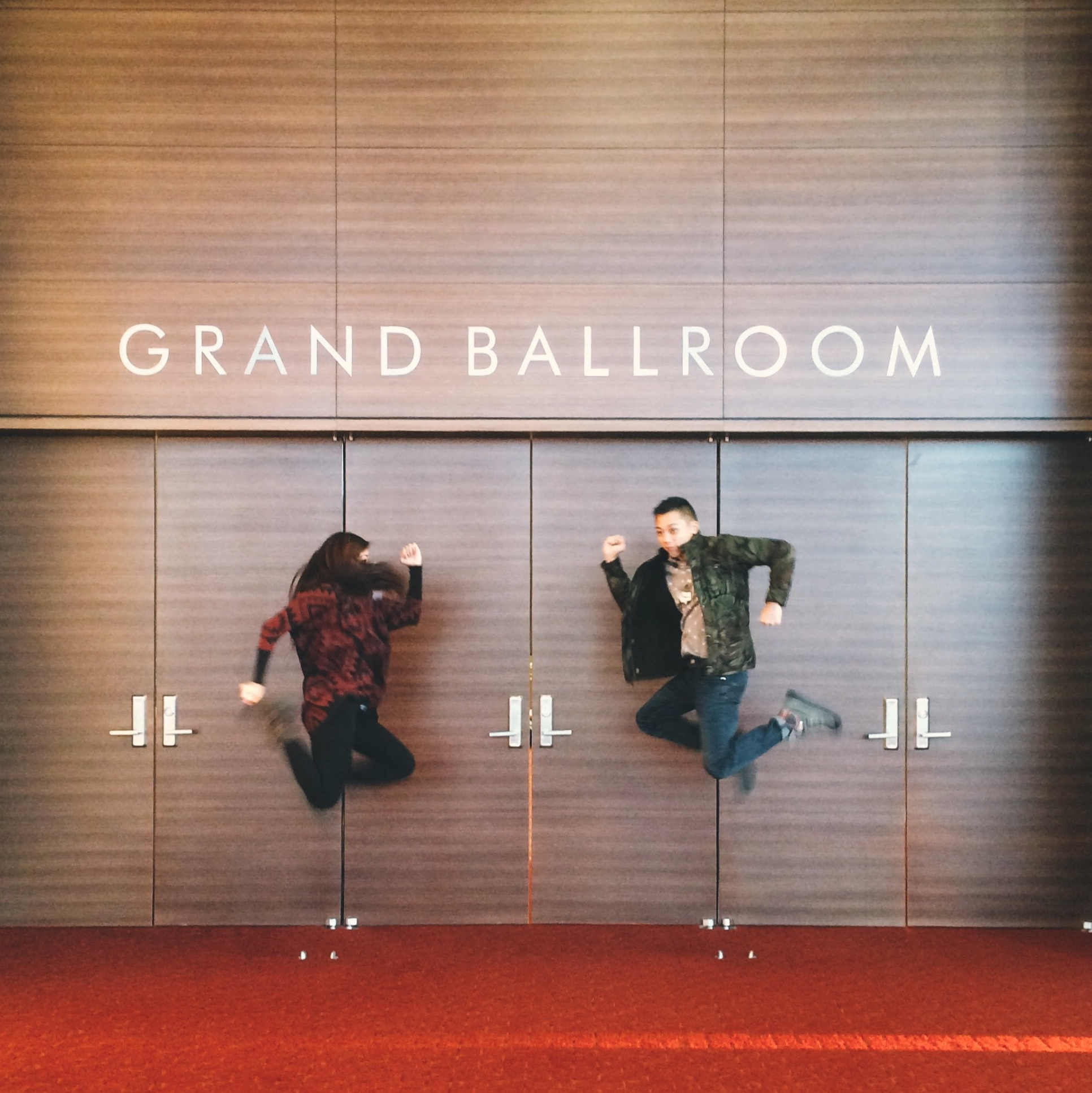
Grand Ballroom

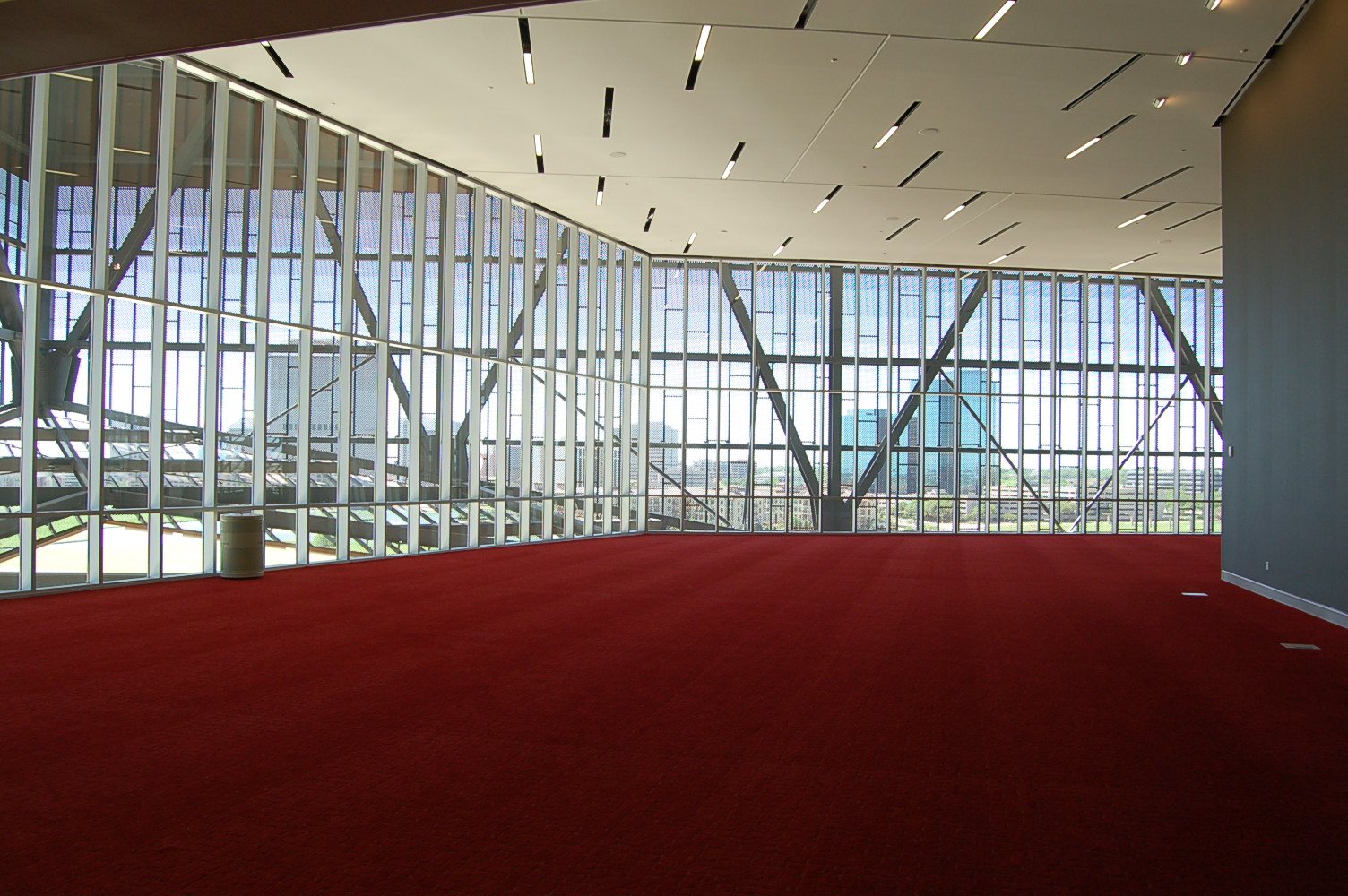
Ballroom Prefunction

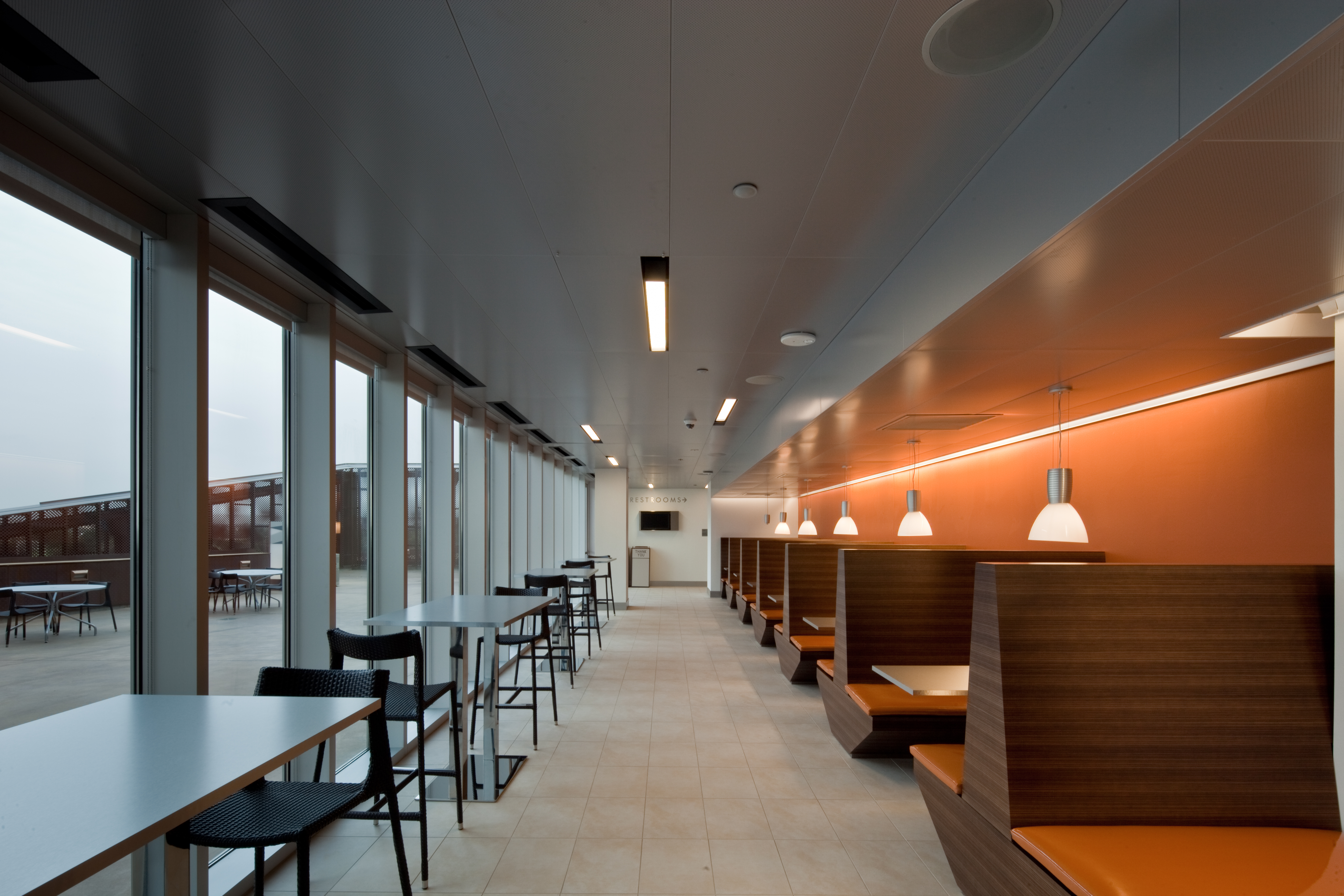
Upstairs Cafe

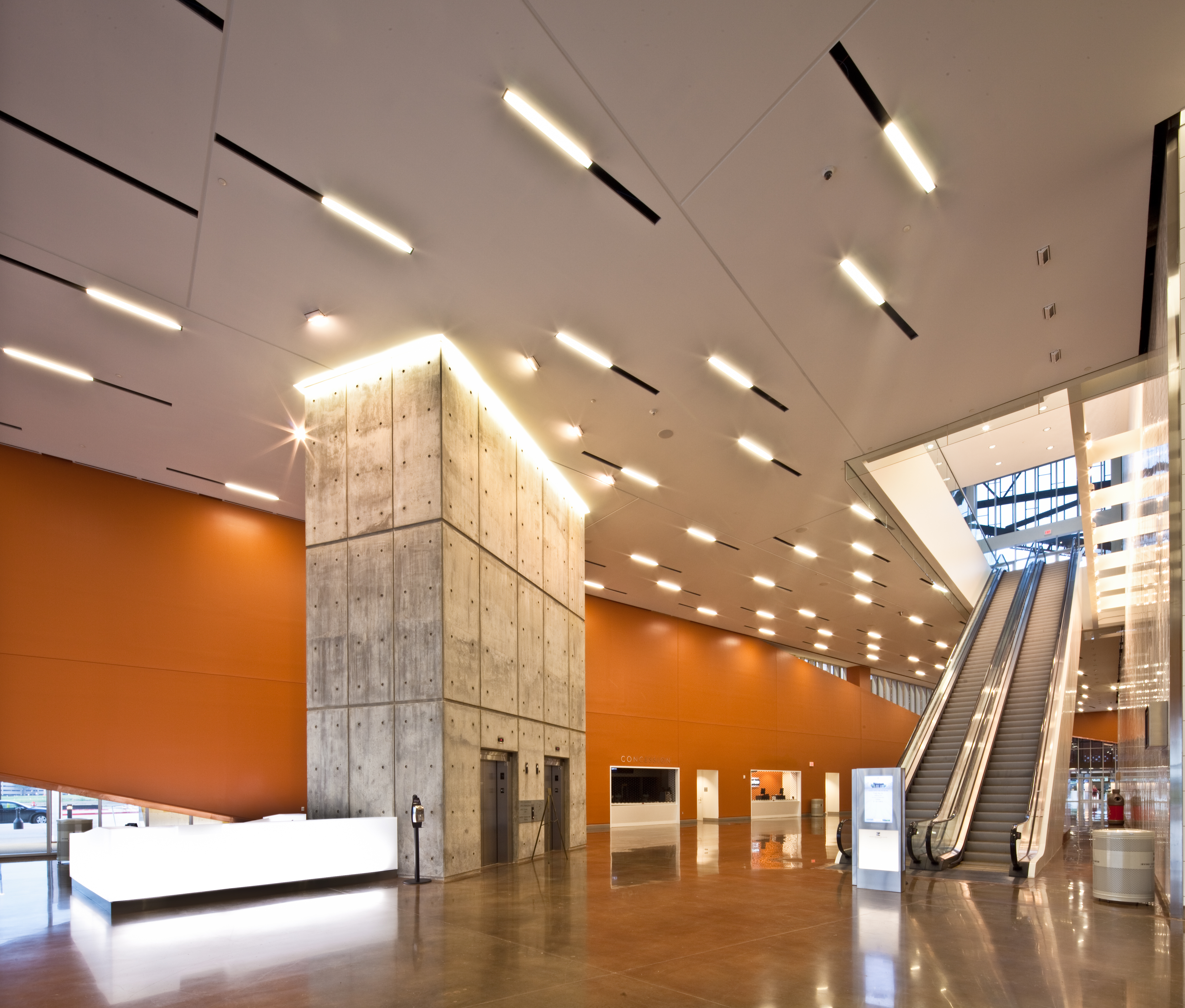
Main Lobby

== Awards ==
- 2012 - Innovative Design in Engineering and Architecture with Structural Steel from American Institute of Steel Construction
- 2015 - Special Mention: Government and Municipal Buildings, Architizer A+ Awards from Architizer
- 2015 - Copper in Architecture Award from Copper Development Associates, Inc.
