= Cal Slayton =

American comic book artist and graphic designer

- Slayton at his drawing board in his home studio.
- Born: Arkansas
- Areas: Penciller, Inker, Writer
- Notable works: Shades of Blue, Texas Zombie Wars

Cal Slayton is an American comic book artist and Graphic Designer.

== Biography ==
Slayton lives in Texas. His most prominent work was on the indie comic book Shades of Blue published first by AMP Comics and then by Digital Webbing. His work has also been seen in books such as Texas Zombie Wars, (Super) Hero Happy Hour, Dead@17 Rough Cut, Digital Webbing Presents and Champion of Children.

=== Career ===
His comic book debut was in 2000 with issue #3 of AMP Comic’s Shades of Blue. Writer/Creator James S. Harris asked him to take over the art duties after the departure of the original artist.

Shortly after, Cal wrote and illustrated the first story ever published by Digital Webbing in the anthology Digital Webbing Presents. The short was titled “Lost Child”, which followed a man search for a missing girl. He later published it in a mini-comic format through the creator-owned Hired Gun Comics

Cal worked on the remaining AMP run of Shades of Blue, which ended with issue #10. He also drew all five issue of the book when Digital Webbing took over as publisher, as well as designing the new Shades of Blue logo.

In October 2002, Cal self-published the mini comic Spookytown under the creator-owned Hired Gun Comics.

In 2003, Cal illustrated the Gail Simone-written back-up story "Part Time" for Geek Punk's Super Hero Happy Hour #4. Later that same year, he contributed artwork to the short "No Love" for Ghostwerks Comics' Champion of Children #2.

In 2004 he drew "Two Shots, Two Slugs" for Geek Punk's Hero Happy Hour Super Special.

In 2005, he contributed art to Dead@17 Rough Cut 2 published by Viper Comics.

He designed the logo for the comic Hero Camp published by Image Comics.

He works on the comic book series Texas Zombie Wars, a companion series to the upcoming film of the same name.

He is a frequent guest at the Dallas Comic Con.

== Bibliography ==
=== Interior Art ===
Comics containing interior sequential illustrations

==== AK Waters Production ====
- Texas Zombie Wars #0-2

==== AMP Comics ====
- Shades of Blue Volume 1 #3-10
- Shades of Blue: The Collected Edition Volume One Trade Paperback

==== Digital Webbing ====
- Digital Webbing Presents #1, #7
- Shades of Blue Volume 2 #1-5
- Shades of Blue: Volume One Trade Paperback

==== Geek Punk ====
- Super Hero Happy Hour #4
- Hero Happy Hour Super Special

==== Ghostwerks Comics ====
- Champion of Children #2

==== Viper Comics ====
- Dead@17: Rough Cut #2

==== Hired Gun Comics ====
- Spookytown #1 mini comic

==== Antihero Comics ====
- Mine All Mine
- One Night Stand

==== Angry Dog Press ====
- Potlatch #7

==== Stumblebum Studios ====
- It Came From Stumblebum

=== Cover and pin-ups ===
Comics containing cover or pin-up illustrations

==== Levity Biographies ====
- WKRP in Cincinnati (Cover)

==== Dork Storm ====
- PvP #5 (back cover)

==== Moonstone ====
- Voltron United and Drawn (pin-up)

==== Story Studios ====
- Johnny Saturn Pinup Gallery (cover)

==== Geek Punk ====
- Super Hero Happy Hour #2 (pin-up)
- Super Hero Happy Hour Trade Paperback Vol. 1 (cover)

==== Image Comics ====
- Dead@17 Afterbirth Trade Paperback (pin-up)
- PvP: The Dork Ages Trade Paperback (pin-up)
- Hero Camp #2 (pin-up)

==== Better Comics ====
- Complex City: All in a Day's Work TPB (pin-up)

==== Half Ass Publishing ====
- Some Big Lumberjack: Reign of the War Pig #1 (cover)

==== Ape Entertainment ====
- Subculture #2 (pin-up)

==== Atomic Chimp Press ====
- Hero Camp - Cool Kids Mini Trade (pin-up)

==== Alias Comics ====
- OZF5: Gale Force #1 (pin-up)

==== Viper Comics ====
- Karma Incorporated TPB #1 (pin-up)

==== Ronin Studios ====
- Lutu: Warrior of the North #1 (pin-up)
- Lutu: Warrior of the North #2 (pin-up)

==== Titan vs. Titan ====
- Grave Soldiers #1 (pin-up)
