= Las Colinas APT System =

People mover in Irving, Texas, US

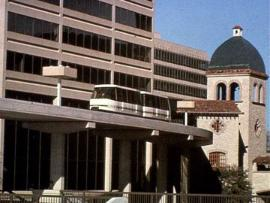
- Outside the Bell Tower Station

Overview
- Locale: Irving, Texas, US
- Transit type: People mover
- Number of lines: 2
- Number of stations: 5

Operation
- Began operation: June 18, 1989
- Ended operation: August 29, 2020
- Operators: Dallas County Utility and Reclamation District

Technical
- System length: 1.4 mi (2.25 km)

The Las Colinas Area Personal Transit System was a people mover system that served the Las Colinas area of Irving, a suburb of Dallas, Texas, United States. The system had five passenger stations and a maintenance & control center, and was served by two cars, one for each route. The system used automated guideway transit technology, although it was eventually driven manually, and existed primarily for the benefit of office workers and a few local residents.

Service was suspended on August 29, 2020. As of April 2021, it was announced that the Las Colinas APT is closed indefinitely.

== History ==
The Las Colinas APT was envisioned as an automated circulator system for the developing Las Colinas Urban Center. The long range plan called for a total of 5 miles (8 km) of dual lane guideway and 20 stations. The system was to contain 3 inner loops and one outer loop, with passengers transferring between loops at four key interchanges. The community of Las Colinas was founded in 1973, but construction of the APT did not begin until 1979. The first phase construction contained 1.4 miles (2.3 km) of guideway and 4 stations.

Although the guideways were in place by 1983, the system was not finalized and opened until 1986, following the purchase of four cars, power and control infrastructure from AEG-Westinghouse, which has since been purchased by Bombardier Transportation. Passenger service began three years later on June 18, 1989, with the first five years of operation to be overseen by the vendor. This was part of a deal that cost $45 million. The system initially operated from 7 a.m. to midnight on weekdays, 11 a.m. to midnight on Saturdays and 11 a.m. to 10 p.m. on Sundays with a fare of 50 cents per ride. In July 1993, the system was closed due to rising expenses and a lack of envisioned development following the Dallas-area real estate crash. The system was mothballed and expansion plans were put on hold.

Las Colinas saw a revival of fortune towards the latter half of the 1990s, and the system reopened accordingly on December 2, 1996. Eventually the system ran only on a limited basis, yet the arrival of DART's Orange Line and development in the area at one point made expansion seem like a possibility. In its final era, as of June 10, 2013, the system ran Monday-Friday from 6:00 am to 6:00 pm, with no service on weekends.

Sometime in January 2013, the APT system was wrapped with a design, courtesy of Fastsigns, showing that the City of Irving, Texas, had received the 2012 Malcolm Baldrige National Quality Award.

== Operations ==
Since the 1996 reopening, the fare-free system was run by the Dallas County Utility and Reclamation District. It ran from 6:00am to 6:00pm on weekdays for the benefit of office workers riding to Bell Tower/Mandalay Canal Station to eat lunch at the restaurants located there, as well as DART passengers boarding at Tower 909.

=== Track routing ===
Phase I, which included part of the outer loop's western section and part of one inner loop, remains the only segment in service until closure. The guideway contained two tracks with space for a third if demand warrants, and is grade-separated for the length of the route. Contrary to popular rumors, the system was never meant to be expanded beyond the Las Colinas Urban Center.

- Track 1 (Red Route) - This route began at 600 E. Las Colinas Boulevard and ends at Urban Towers.
- Track 2 (Blue Route) - This route began at 600 E. Las Colinas Boulevard and ended at the 909 Tower and the DART Orange Line Las Colinas Urban Center Station.
- Track 3 - This track began at Urban Towers and ended at Tower 909. The guideway was constructed but tracks were never installed or in operation.

=== Stations ===
The four original stations and maintenance center were the only operational stopping points for passengers on the APT system. All stations were elevated and protected from the elements. All stations except for Bell Tower/Mandalay Canal Station were accessed through private office buildings.

- Urban Towers - Tracks 1 and 3, serving the Urban Towers office building at 222 W. Las Colinas Blvd. This served as the current northern terminus of the system.
- Tower 909 - Tracks 2 and 3, located at 909 Lake Carolyn Parkway. This stop served the Tower 909 office building and is the eastern terminus of the system. The station included an elevated pedestrian connection to the DART Orange Line Las Colinas Urban Center Station.
- Bell Tower/Mandalay Canal - Tracks 1 and 2, located above the Mandalay Canal at 27 Mandalay Canal. This was the main and most popular station and served numerous dining options. Known formally as the Lauren E. McKinney Transit Center.
- 600 Las Colinas Boulevard - Tracks 1 and 2, serving the adjacent office building.

=== Vehicles and maintenance ===
Out of the four vehicles purchased in 1986 from Intermountain Design Inc. (IDI), only two were used on day-to-day service. Each vehicle could carry 45 passengers comfortably: 33 standing and 12 seated. The system was operated manually, with only two trains running as demand dictates. The drivers used a small control panel that is equipped with an emergency and maintenance controls. In April 2013, Schwager Davis, Inc. signed a contract with DCURD for the Operation & Maintenance of the Las Colinas APT System. Today Schwager Davis, Inc. employees 10 people to maintain the system, dispatch the trains & (4) drivers.

The Maintenance and Control Center was where all vehicles were stored. Each train started its first morning journey there. The control center was staffed by an overseer during times of operation.

== Gallery ==
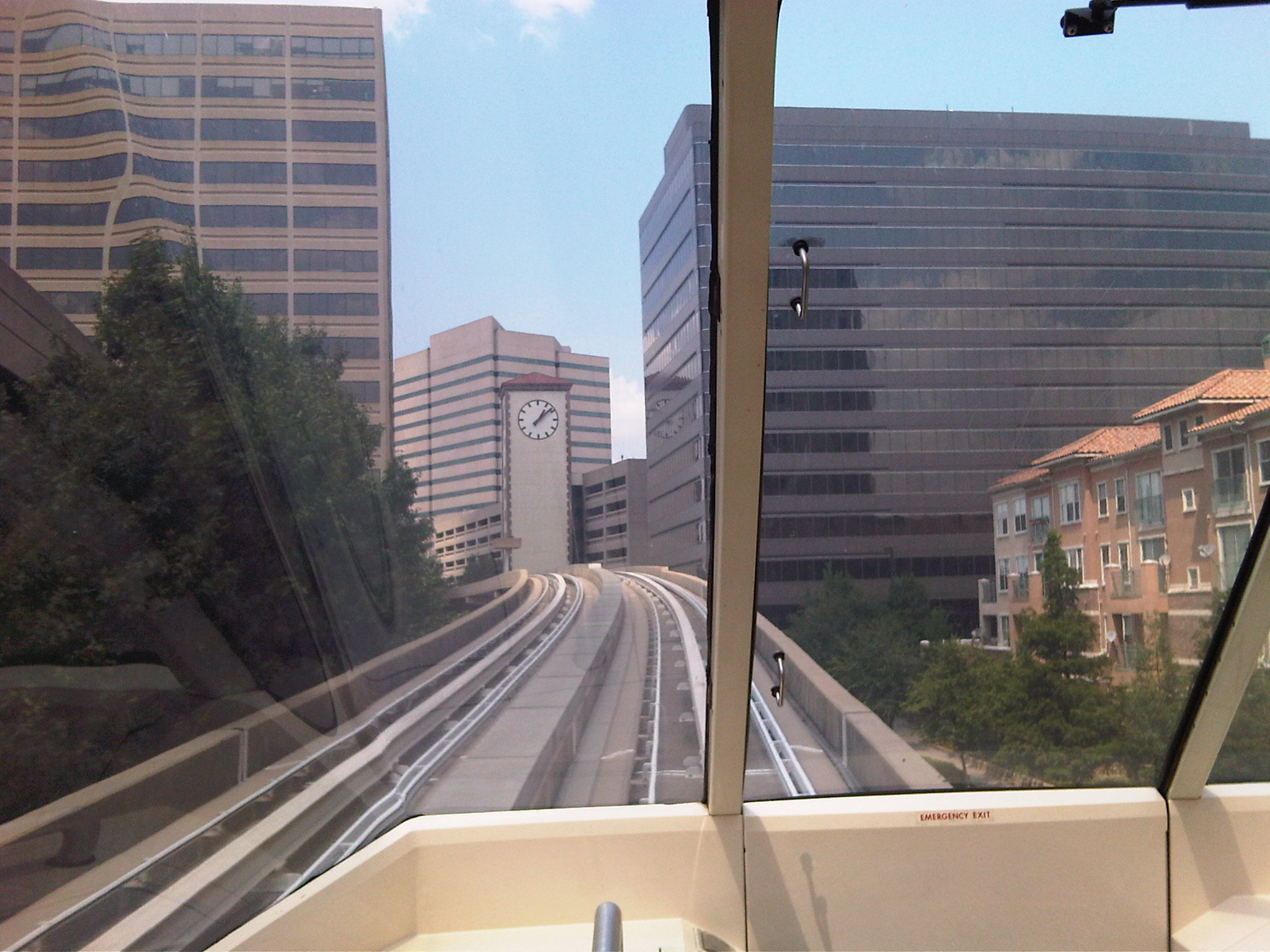
Las Colinas APT travelling toward Bell Tower/Mandalay Canal Station.

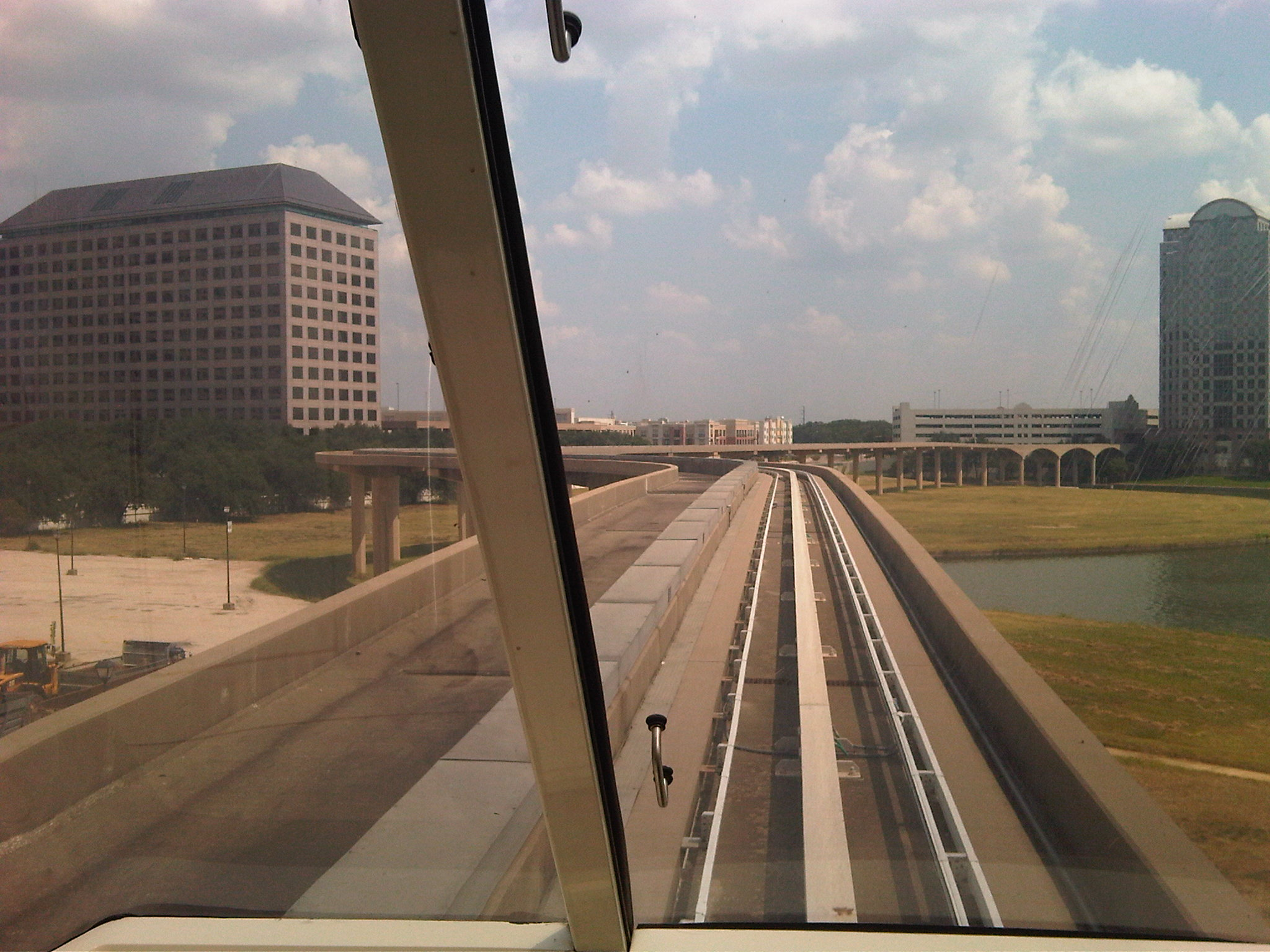
Las Colinas APT travelling toward Tower on Lake Carolyn Station.

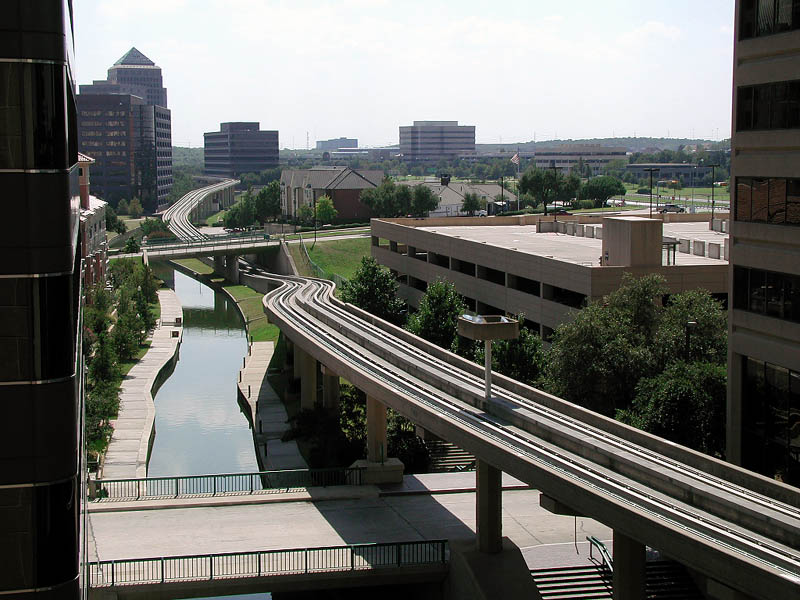
APT guideway and Tracks1/2 looking south from near Bell Tower/Mandalay Canal Station

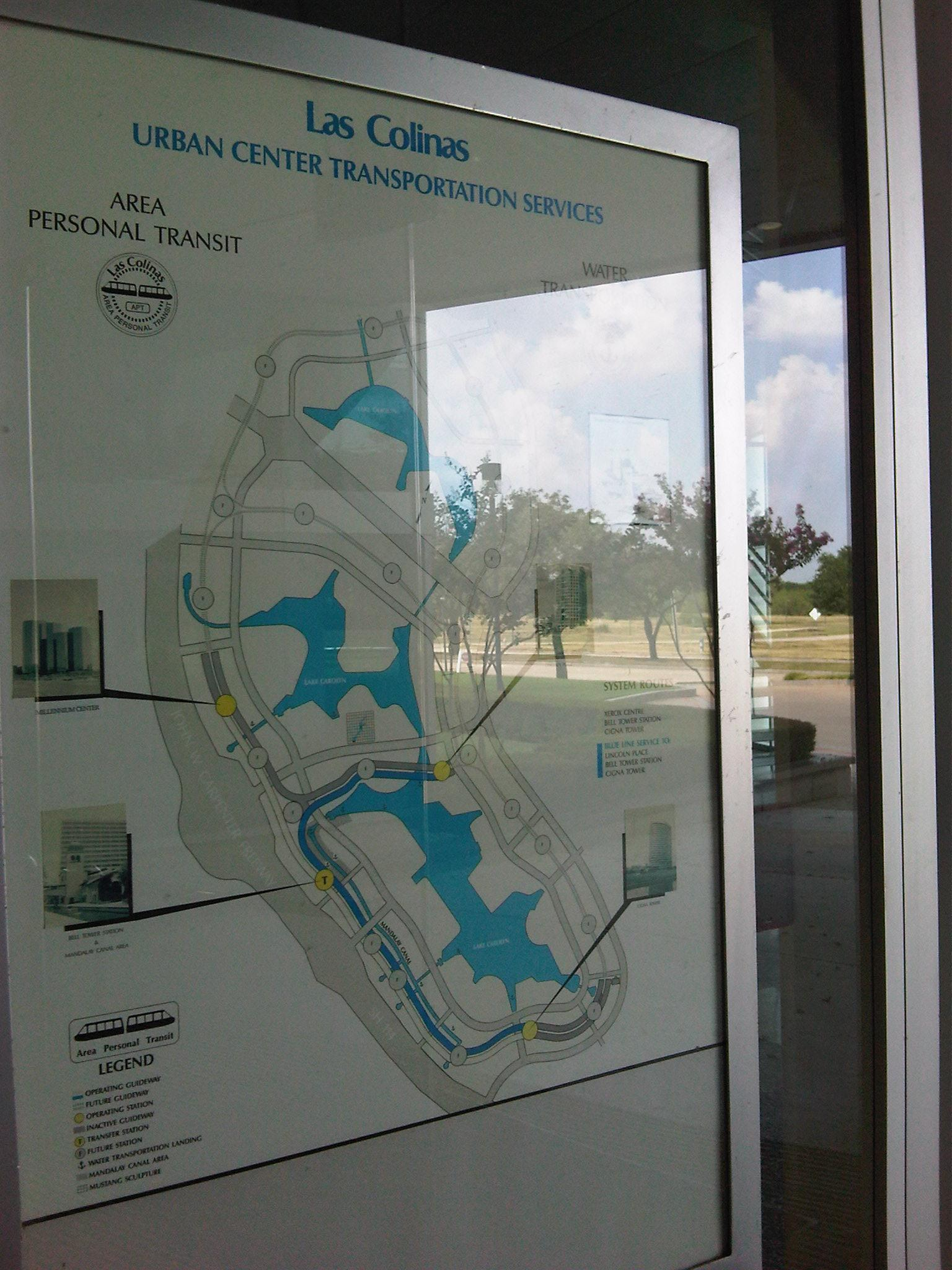
Map of the Las Colinas APT system showing current service and original planned routes.

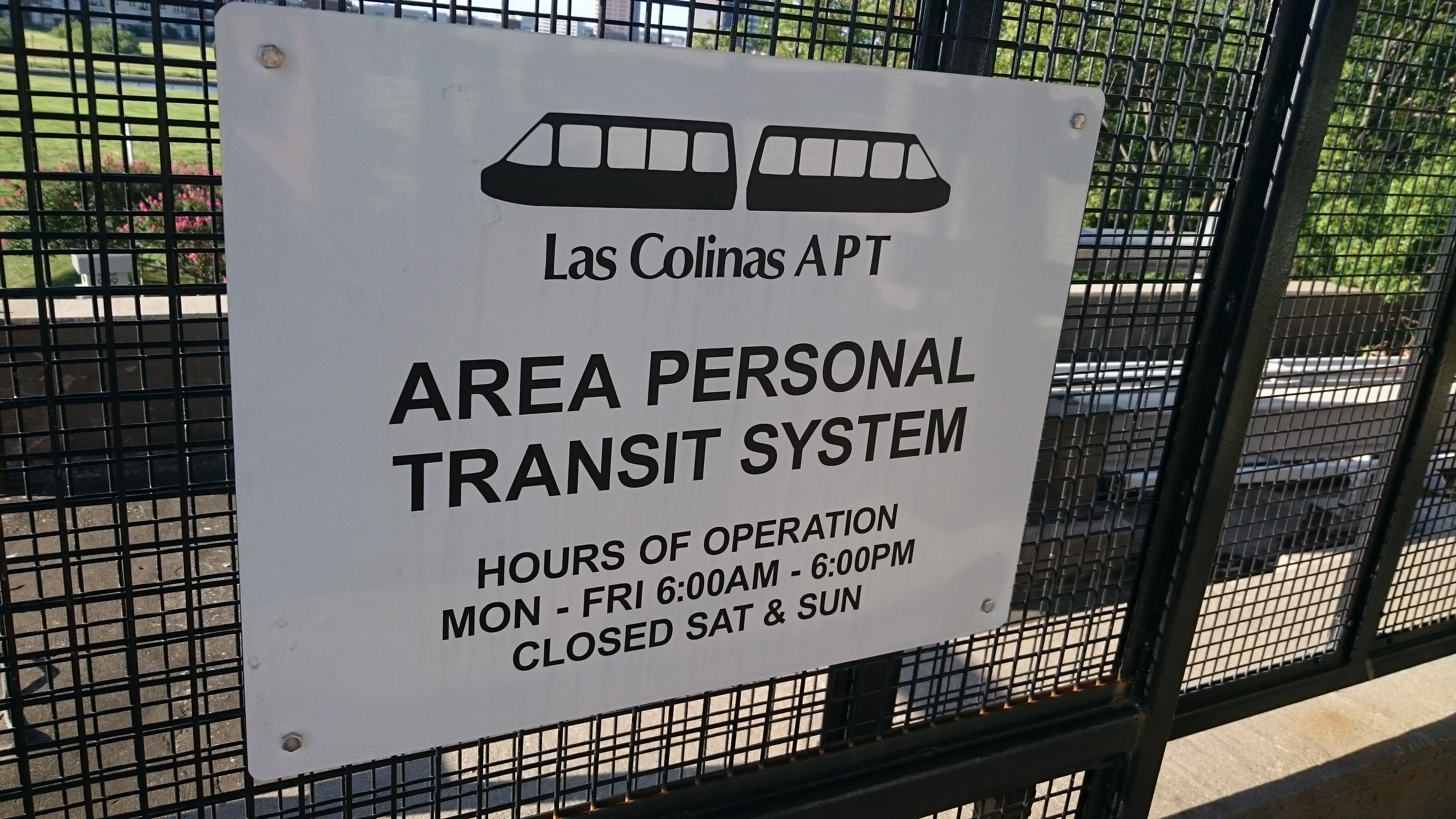
Sign indicating hours of operation.

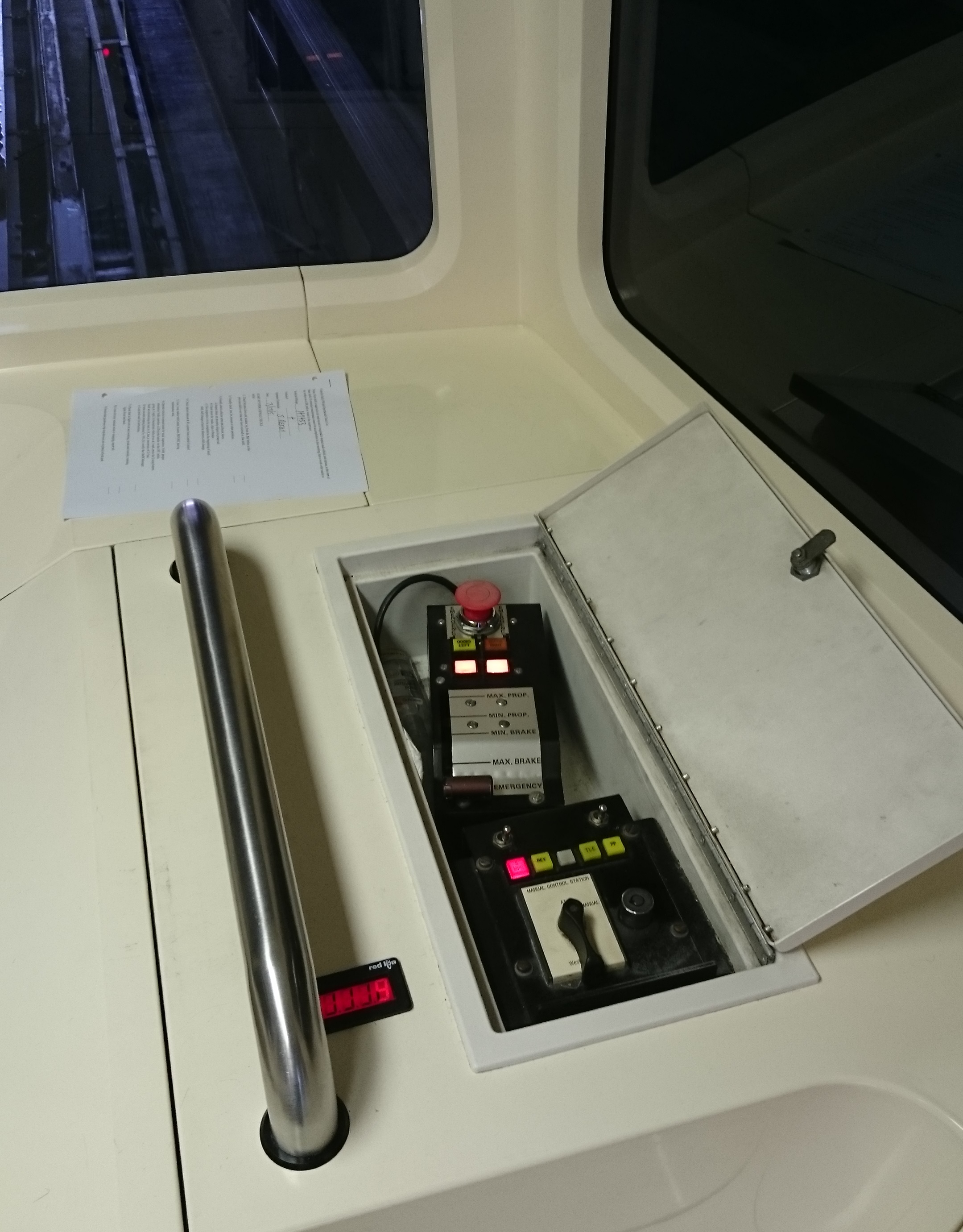
Controls of an APT car.

== Future expansion ==
Plans to expand the system have existed since the inception of the APT. The original plan called for a banana-shaped loop route that completely circled Lake Carolyn, but DART's Orange Line will now follow the route of the planned eastern section (although this does not block the APT from potentially following the same path, nor is DART able to fulfill the same purpose on this route as the APT). A number of guideway supports without tracks existed north of the Urban Towers Station before they were demolished to make way for development. The Track 2/3 guideway has enough space for two lines, although currently only Track 2 is in operation.

In 2012, the Dallas County Utility and Reclamation District completed a process to expand the system with the arrival of DART's Orange Line, creating an interchange at Tower 909 Station with DART's adjacent Las Colinas Urban Center Station. Additional possible future expansion options considered during this phase of growth include:

- Building out Track 3, acquiring additional vehicles, automating the system and expanding operational hours.
- Constructing infill stations along existing lines at various locations of development projects.
- Extending Track 1/3 north on existing guideway supports to a planned entertainment district.
- Extending Track 1/2 to South Las Colinas Station for future commuter rail access.

== Controversy ==
Some, such as Gary N. Bourland, author of Las Colinas: The Inside Story of America's Premier Urban Development, cite cases of the APT System being viewed as an expensive white elephant. It has also been cited as one of the contributors towards the high rate of taxation in the Las Colinas area. However, the Northwest Corridor Major Investment Study - carried out on behalf of the Dallas Area Rapid Transit Board of Directors - referenced the (since completed) integration of the APT system into the DART public transit network, showing that demand remained for the service's continuation and even expansion. This, however, never came to be.
