= Irving Convention Center station =

DART rail station in the Las Colinas development of Irving, Texas

Irving Convention Center
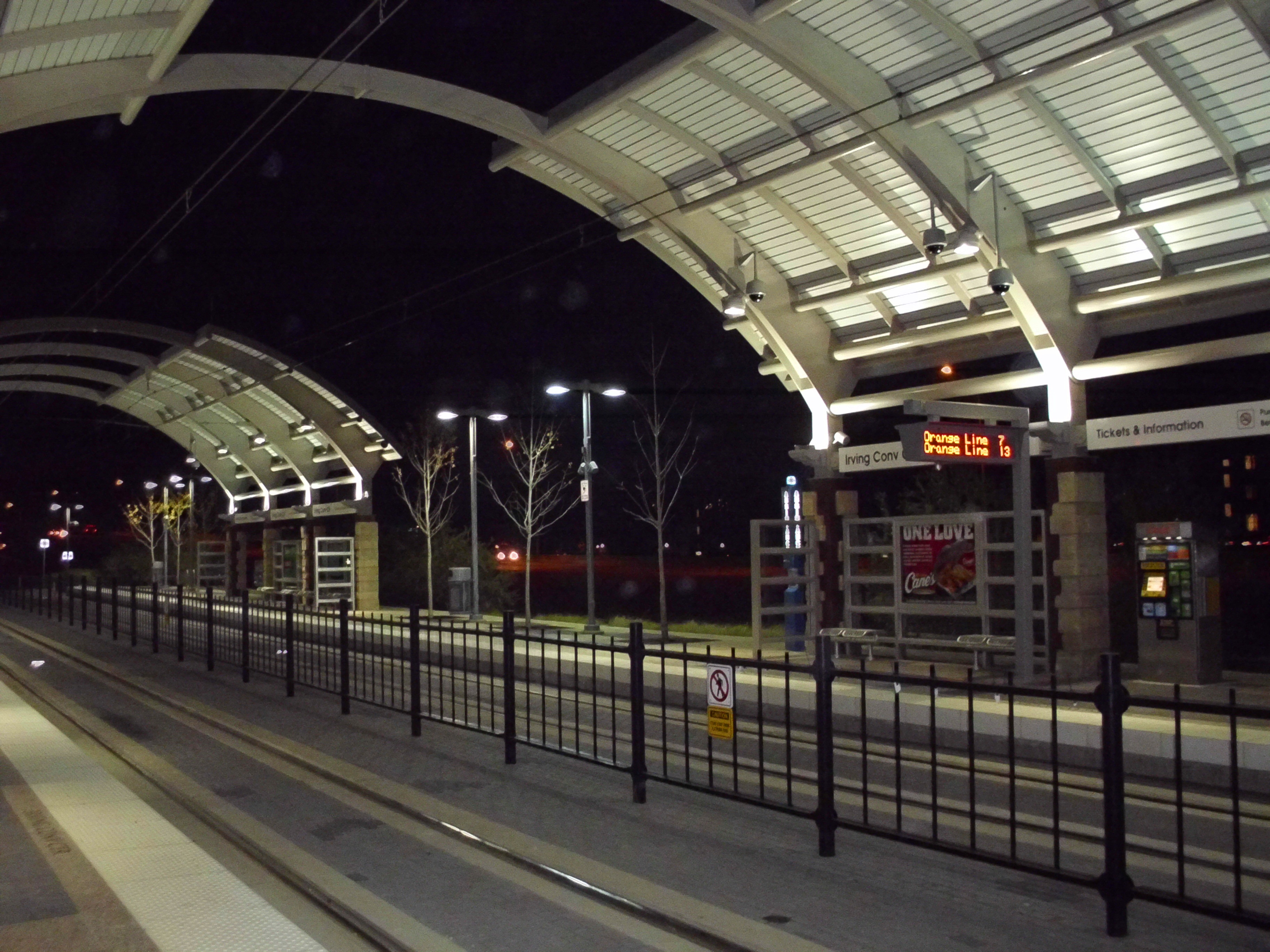
- Irving Convention Center station platforms

General information
- Location: 80 West Northwest Highway; Irving, Texas
- Coordinates: 32°52′36″N 96°56′17″W
- System: DART rail
- Owner: Dallas Area Rapid Transit
- Platforms: 2 side platforms
- Bus stands: 1
- Connections: DART: 227; Irving Connector: The Loop; North Central Irving GoLink Zone (M-Sun)

Construction
- Structure type: At grade
- Parking: 721 spaces at North Irving Transit Center
- Cycle facilities: 1 rack
- Accessible: Yes

History
- Opened: July 30, 2012

Passengers
- FY 2025: 155 (avg. weekday) ▲2.6%

Services
Preceding station	DART	Following station
Hidden Ridge toward DFW Airport Terminal A	Orange Line	Las Colinas Urban Center toward LBJ/Central or Parker Road
Location

Irving Convention Center station is a DART rail station in the Las Colinas development of Irving, Texas. It serves the Orange Line. The station is located on a frontage road of Northwest Highway (Spur 348) and serves the development's Convention District, including the Irving Convention Center and Toyota Music Factory.

Parking for the station is located at North Irving Transit Center, which is 1/2 mile (0.80 km) southeast of the station. A pedestrian walkway, which passes under Northwest Highway, connects the two facilities.

As of the 2025 fiscal year, the station has the lowest ridership of all DART rail stations, with an average of 155 riders on weekdays, 115 riders on Saturdays, and 94 riders on Sundays.

== History ==
A 2000 study the Northwest Corridor, which became the northern legs of the Orange Line and Green Line, described four potential light rail routes through Las Colinas's urban center. Each of these routes included a stop at the existing North Irving Transit Center on the northern side of Lake Carolyn. However, an alternative station for the area was also proposed under the name North Urban Center. This station would be located on the opposite side of Northwest Highway to make it closer to a denser portion of the development.

A 2008 plan for the corridor used the alternative station under the name North Las Colinas. The proposal remained similar, although a planned parking lot was removed in favor of a pedestrian connection to the existing North Irving Transit Center lot.

To secure land for the line, DART agreed to build the station at the intersection of two tracts, with the expectation that development would be spurred on both. The station would also be adjacent to Las Colinas Entertainment Center, a proposed $250 million development containing a convention center, a plaza, a hotel, and restaurants. However, due to financial issues, only the convention center was constructed by the station's opening.

The station opened on July 30, 2012, alongside the University of Dallas and Las Colinas Urban Center stations, and served as the line's terminus until it was extended to Belt Line the following December. At opening, the station (via its connection to North Irving Transit Center) was the only station on the Orange Line to contain parking.

Following the opening of the Orange Line, DART moved the area's primary bus transfer point to the Las Colinas Urban Center station, leaving both Irving Convention Center and North Irving Transit Center with no bus service. However, in the following December, this was reversed, with DART redirecting six routes to one or both stations.

In 2026, the city of Irving introduced a van circulator, dubbed "The Loop at Las Colinas", to improve Las Colinas's last-mile connections. The shuttle stops at both DART rail stations along Lake Carolyn.

== See also ==
- North Irving Transit Center
