= Las Colinas Urban Center station =

DART rail station in the Las Colinas development of Irving, Texas

Las Colinas Urban Center
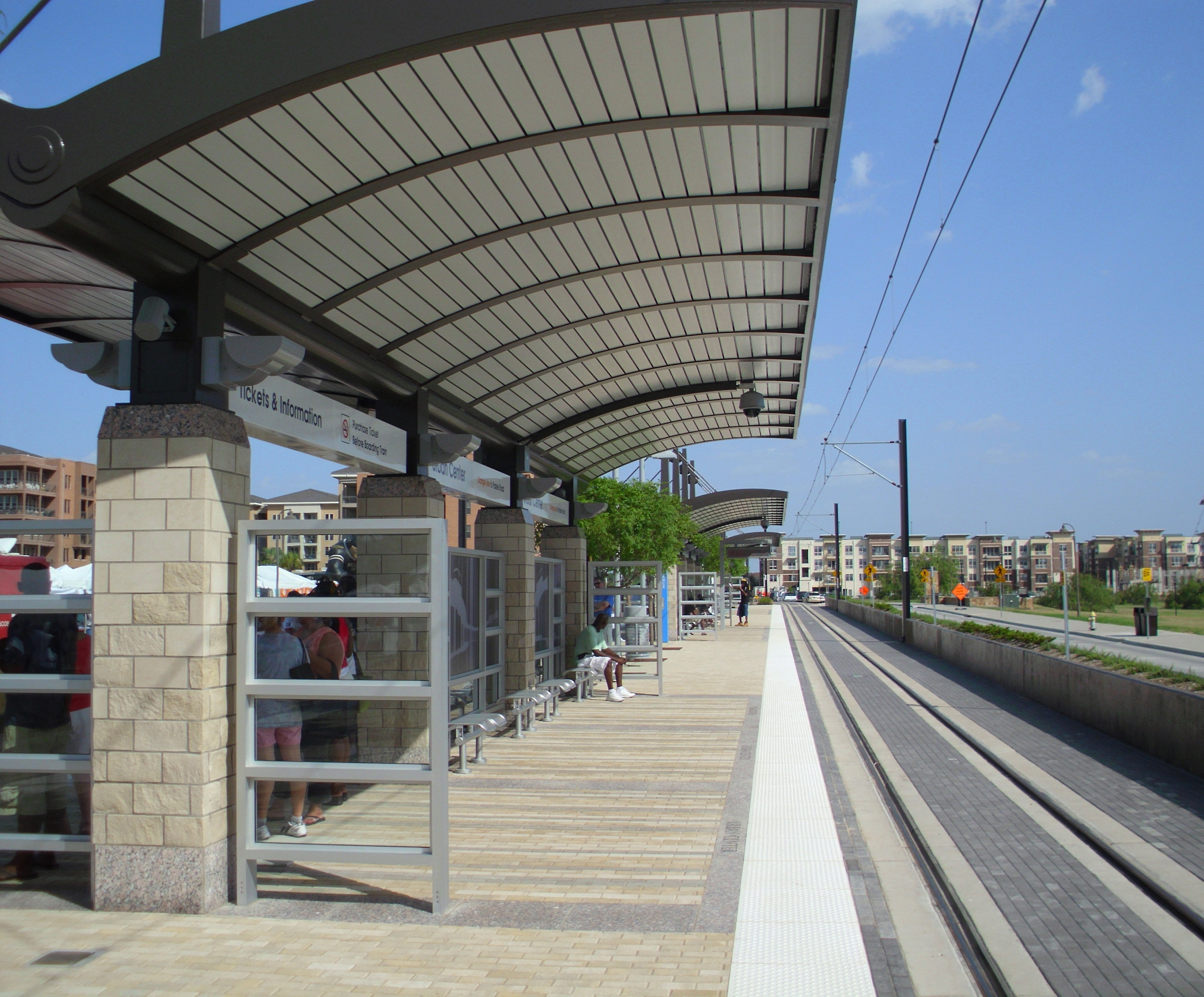
- Passengers waiting on DART Orange Line train.

General information
- Location: 890 Lake Carolyn Parkway, Irving, TX, 75039
- Coordinates: 32°52′07″N 96°56′01″W
- System: DART rail
- Owner: Dallas Area Rapid Transit
- Connections: Irving Connector: The Loop

Construction
- Structure type: At-grade
- Accessible: Yes

History
- Opened: July 30, 2012

Passengers
- FY 2025: 238 (avg. weekday) ▼1.7%

Services
Preceding station	DART	Following station
Irving Convention Center toward DFW Airport Terminal A	Orange Line	University of Dallas toward LBJ/Central or Parker Road
Location

Las Colinas Urban Center station is a DART rail station in the Las Colinas development of Irving, Texas. It serves the Orange Line. A connection with the Las Colinas APT used to serve the businesses and residents of the Las Colinas Urban Center.

The station was temporarily used as a replacement for the North Irving Transit Center until the opening of the second phase of the Orange Line when bus routes were then split between the North Irving Transit Center, Irving Convention Center station, and North Lake College station.
