= North Irving Transit Center =

Park and ride lot in Irving, Texas

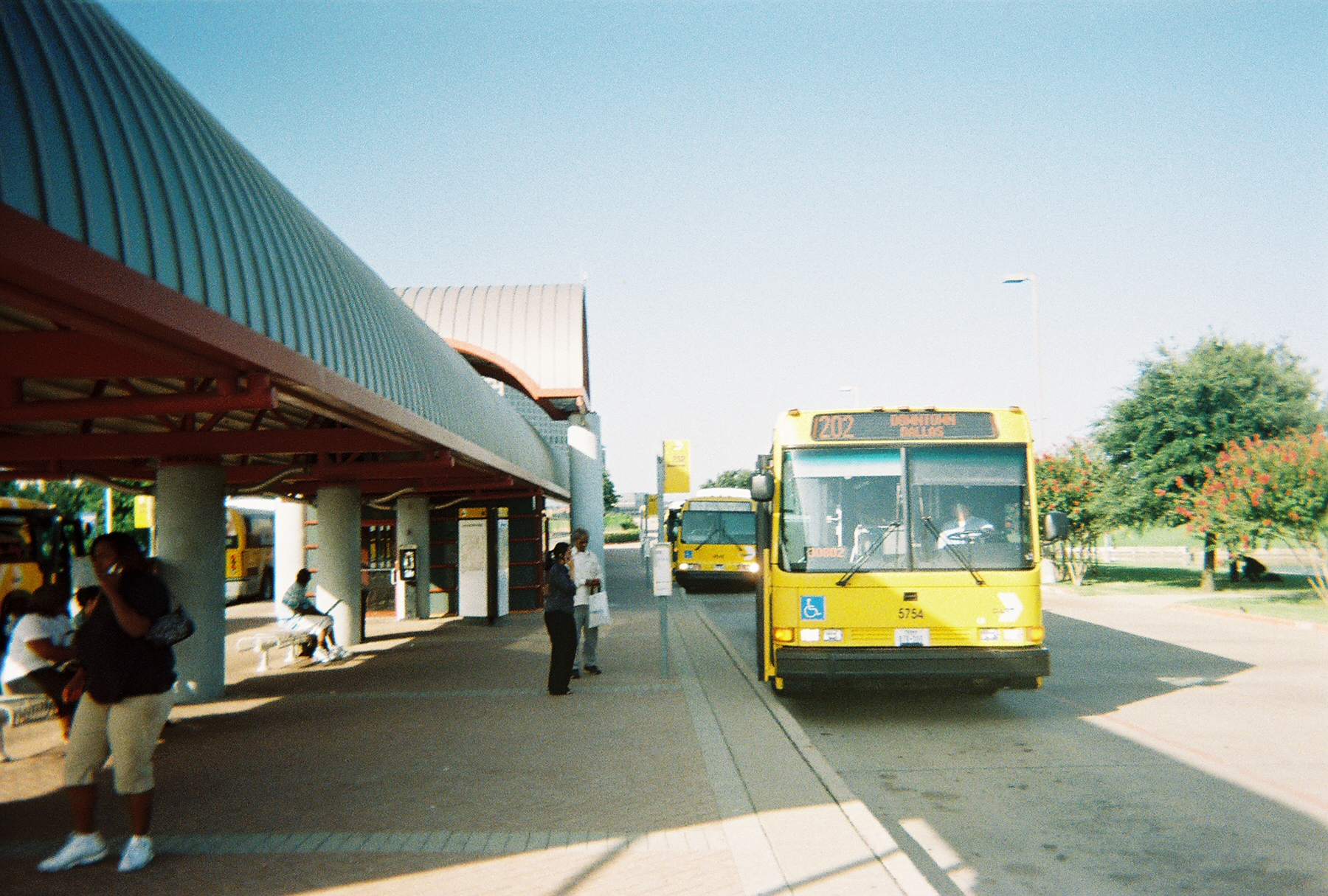
- Buses awaiting departure at North Irving Transit Center.

General information
- Location: 5601 Riverside Dr. Irving, Texas 75039
- Coordinates: 32°52′35″N 96°56′02″W
- Owner: Dallas Area Rapid Transit
- Connections: , 227, and North Central Irving GoLink Zone (M-Sun) at Irving Convention Center

Construction
- Parking: 721 spaces
- Cycle facilities: 2 bike lockers
- Accessible: Yes

History
- Opened: June 7, 1993; December 3, 2012 (re-opened)
- Closed: July 30, 2012; January 24, 2022 (after re-opening)
Location

North Irving Transit Center is a bus-only station located along Northwest Highway (Spur 348) in the Las Colinas neighborhood of Irving, Texas (USA) owned by Dallas Area Rapid Transit (DART). The transit center is a ten-minute walk from DART's Irving Convention Center light rail station, with a pedestrian walkway under Northwest Highway connecting the two.

Following the 2022 redesign of DART's bus network, North Irving Transit Center does not receive bus service. The station currently serves as a park-and-ride lot for Irving Convention Center station.

== History ==
The first DART facility in Las Colinas, referred to as North Irving Park & Ride, was opened on September 16, 1985. The facility, located at the intersection of O'Connor Boulevard and Carpenter Highway, was one of the first to be built by DART following its expansion into the suburbs.

In 1988, following a groundbreaking ceremony for South Irving Transit Center, DART announced possible locations for a similar indoor facility in North Irving. The agency purchased a 12-acre parcel for the facility in 1991; North Irving Transit Center opened two years later on June 7, 1993. In 1995, DART installed a windmill sculpture and a plaque dedicated to local disability advocate Cathy Thomas.

=== Closure and re-opening ===
On July 30, 2012, the first phase of DART's Orange Line, which consisted of three stations, opened. As part of the project, DART opted to move the region's primary transfer point to the new Las Colinas Urban Center station, leaving North Irving Transit Center with no routes. However, DART was unable to build parking at any of the new stations, necessitating that the transit center's park-and-ride lot remain to service the new line.

On December 3, 2012, alongside the Orange Line's second phase, the transit center was reopened. To improve transfer opportunities, six routes were redirected from Las Colinas Urban Center to Irving Convention Center and/or North Irving Transit Center.

=== Second closure ===
The transit center remained open until January 24, 2022, when the bus network was substantially redesigned. The new network's consolidation of existing routes and expansion of on-demand service zones (branded as GoLink) substantially reduced the number of routes in the area from five to one. The remaining route (227) services Irving Convention Center directly, again leaving North Irving Transit Center with no routes.

On October 25, 2022, DART sold 3 acres (1.2 ha) of the transit center's parking lot to the city of Irving for the construction of a new fire station.
