= Irving Convention and Visitors Bureau =

Tourism in Texas

The Irving Convention and Visitors Bureau (also known as the ICVB) is an independent nonprofit organization which aims to direct individuals traveling to Dallas and Fort Worth for business conventions and for leisure. It is a hospitality industry, which makes $1.5 billion annually. ICVB is funded by Irving's hotel and motel tax collections which includes hundreds of restaurants and 75 hotels which have more than 11,000 rooms. The Irving CVB is not a membership-based organization.

== History ==
Irving was founded in 1903 by J.O. Schulze and Otis Brown, after purchasing 80 acres (320,000 m^{2}) of land which is now Irving. The first two town lots sold in December 1903 at the public auction.

== Location ==
The Irving CVB building is located immediately adjacent to Dallas/Fort Worth International Airport alongside Las Colinas. It is located in between Dallas and Fort Worth.

== Awards ==
ICVB received the Gold Service Award from Meetings and Conventions Magazine, the Awards of Excellence from Corporate & Incentive Travel Magazine, and the Successful Meetings' Pinnacle Award.
