= Jaime Mendoza =

Bolivian doctor, journalist and writer

Jaime Mendoza Gonzáles
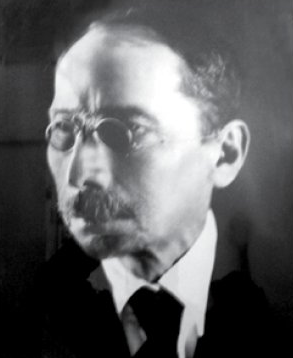
- Born: 1874; Sucre, Bolivia
- Died: 1939 (aged 64–65)
- Occupation(s): Doctor, journalist, writer
- Known for: Novelist, founder of newspapers
- Notable work: En las tierras del Potosí (1911)

Jaime Mendoza Gonzáles (1874–1939) was a Bolivian doctor, journalist and writer. A native of Sucre, he trained to be a doctor, providing valuable services in Llallagua and in Guerra del Acre. As a journalist, he founded the newspapers Nuevas Rutas and La República in Sucre. He also wrote for many newspapers around the country.

His novel En las tierras del Potosí (1911) is considered one of the best novels in Bolivian literature.

== Selected novels ==
- En las tierras del Potosí (1911)
- Páginas bárbaras (1914)
- Memorias de un estudiante (1918)
- Los héroes anónimos (1928)
- El lago enigmático (1936)
- Voces de antaño (1938)

== Selected non-fiction ==
- La Universidad de Charcas y la idea revolucionaria (1924)
- La creación de una nacionalidad (1925)
- Ayacucho y el Alto Perú (1926)
- Biografía de Gregorio Pacheco (1926)
- El factor Geográfico en la nacionalidad boliviana (1925)
- El Macizo Boliviano (1935)
- La Tesis Andinista, Bolivia-Paraguay (1933)
- La tragedia del Chaco (1933).
