= Amy Allen (actress) =

American actress and film crew member

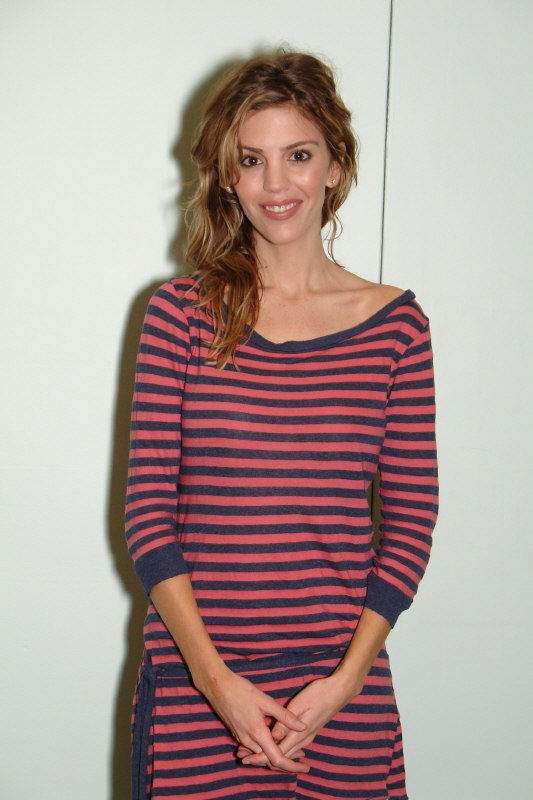
- Allen in 2007.
- Born: October 24, 1976 (age 49); Burbank, California, U.S.
- Education: San Francisco State University
- Occupation: Actress
- Years active: 2001–present

Amy E. Allen (born October 24, 1976) is an American actress and film crew member who portrayed the Jedi Master Aayla Secura in Star Wars films released in 2002 and 2005. She worked behind the scenes on many different movies, including A.I. Artificial Intelligence, before she acted in Star Wars.

== Acting career ==
After graduating in film at the San Francisco State University, Allen was a production assistant with Industrial Light & Magic, with credits in films such as A.I. Artificial Intelligence, Jurassic Park III and Pearl Harbor. During a break from filming Gangs of New York once the film's release date was postponed, she wound up working in Star Wars: Episode II – Attack of the Clones, and was selected to portray Jedi Knight Aayla Secura, a humanoid of the Twi'lek species with distinctive head tails and blue skin. The character was a last-minute addition to the Episode II script; she had been created for a licensed Star Wars comic book by Dark Horse Comics and was added to the film after Lucas saw a cover illustration of the character. Allen had previously been cast as an extra in the DVD release of Star Wars: Episode I – The Phantom Menace as a Twi'lek as well.

She reprised her role as Aayla Secura in Star Wars: Episode III – Revenge of the Sith. Her character is killed by clone troopers as part of the Jedi Purge.

== Personal life ==
Allen grew up in Los Angeles county, first in the San Fernando Valley and then Agoura Hills where she attended Agoura High School, before moving to San Francisco at 18 for college. She is the granddaughter of writer Henry Wilson Allen.

Allen frequently makes appearances at conventions, including C2 and C3, SDCC 2005, Celebration V (2010) and Celebration VI (2012). At Celebration II, she participated in a panel discussion of "Women Who Kick."

Allen has been married to Hoobastank drummer Chris Hesse since 2008.

== Partial filmography ==
- Star Wars: Episode II – Attack of the Clones (2002) - Aayla Secura / Mya Nalle / Yma Nalle / Lela Mayn (uncredited)
- Star Wars: Episode III – Revenge of the Sith (2005) - Aayla Secura
