= FedCon =

German science fiction convention

Federation Convention
- Status: Active
- Genre: Science Fiction/Multi-media Fandom
- Location: Bonn/Düsseldorf
- Country: Germany
- Inaugurated: 1992
- Attendance: Approx. 5000
- Organizer: FedCon GmbH
- Website: http://www.fedcon.de/

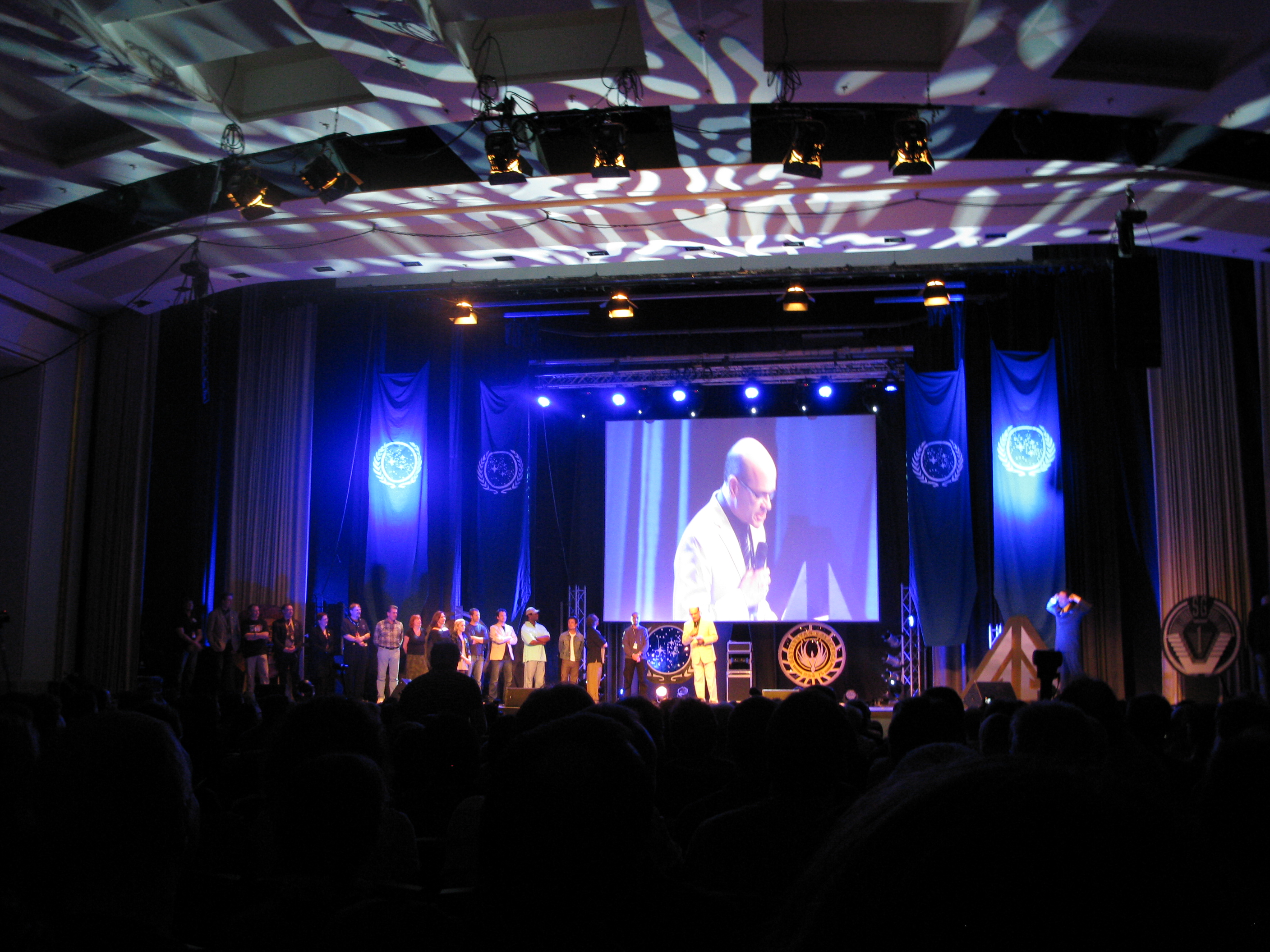
FedCon 2009

FedCon (short for Federation Convention) is a science fiction convention in Germany. It is primarily focused on the Star Trek franchise. FedCon is the largest Star Trek convention in Europe.

== History ==
FedCon has been held annually in spring since 1992. In 2005, it was held in Bonn—as several years before—but in 2006, it took place in Fulda, while it returned to Bonn in 2007. FedCon is attended by science fiction fans from 25-30 different countries around the world and is frequently hosted by Master of Ceremonies, Marc B. Lee of Orlando, Florida. FedCon used to be a 3-day convention, but due to its 20th anniversary, it moved to Düsseldorf Maritim hotel and became a 4-day convention. In 2010, it was hosted by Ed Wasser, 2011 until 2013 by Garrett Wang, and since 2014, Nessi Wann-Petry is hosting the show.

Created by Dirk Bartholomae of Augsburg, Germany, FedCon has shown its fans a different brand of conventioneering by providing stage entertainment with professional stunt teams, musical acts and performances by its actor guests.

FedCon GmbH, its corporate label, is also responsible for the Ring*Con Lord of the Rings convention.

Contrary to many science fiction events originating in the 1960s and 1980s, which were orientated on sci-fi literature, FedCon focuses on movies and television. It started as a pure Star Trek convention and spread its spectrum over the years.

== Guests ==
Starting with Walter Koenig, first guests were actors from the various Star Trek series, but later also included actors and co-workers from other series like Babylon 5, Battlestar Galactica, Star Wars, Buffy, Farscape, Andromeda, Stargate and Xena: Warrior Princess. Other special guests attending the FedCon include authors, voice artists, scientists and astronauts.

== FedCon USA ==
FedCon is not to be confused with FedCon USA, a similar convention in Dallas, United States, in June 2008 which licensed the name but closed mid-convention due to poor attendance. FedCon claims that it disassociated itself with FedCon USA in January 2008.

== Activities ==
Activities and events at the convention typically include (but are not limited to):

- Panel discussions with actors and other guests.
- Autographing sessions
- Photographing sessions with the actors
- Speeches or other presentations by scientists and experts about a specific topic, like the Klingon language.
- Socialising in the evening convention-party, where some stars might also appear.
- Costuming - both formal competition, and casual hall costumes.
- Dealers' room - a large hall full of people selling books, movies, jewellery, costumes (often including weapons), games, comic books, etc.
- Art show - presenting paintings, drawings, sculpture and other work, primarily on science fiction and fantasy themes
- Live performances, e.g. Klingon Rock Music or a fight show.
- Watching science fiction movies, television shows, etc.
- Possibility for local fangroups and role-playing groups to represent themselves

== Special Facts ==
In the year 2011, FedCon achieved the world record of the most people in a Star Trek costume, having counted 691 people. They had achieved the record in the previous year with 507 persons, but it was soon beaten by a convention in Las Vegas with 571 costumed people. In September 2011, this record has been beaten again at a convention in Las Vegas with 1,040 fans.

== Previous FedCons ==
FedCon	year	location	guests
FedCon I	1–3 May 1992	Turmhotel Augsburg	Walter Koenig
FedCon II	1–3 April 1994	Arabella Hotel Munich	George Takei – Robin Curtis – Richard Arnold
FedCon III	30 June – 2 July 1995	Sheraton Hotel Munich	Jonathan Frakes – Brent Spiner – Eric Stillwell – Lolita Fatjo – Richard Arnold
FedCon IV	10–12 May 1996	Maritim Hotel Bonn	Walter Koenig – Denise Crosby – Armin Shimerman – Garrett Wang – Robert Picardo – Richard Arnold, Lolita Fatjo – Marc B. Lee
FedCon V	9–11 May 1997	Maritim Hotel Bonn	William Shatner – Roxann Dawson – Nana Visitor – Ethan Phillips – Chase Masterson – Mira Furlan – Marc B. Lee
FedCon VI	17–19 April 1998	Maritim Hotel Bonn	Kate Mulgrew – Robert Beltran – Tim Russ – Max Grodénchik – Nichelle Nichols – Richard Arnold – Marc B. Lee
FedCon VII	30 April – 2 May 1999	Maritim Hotel Bonn	Leonard Nimoy – Robert Duncan McNeill – Jeri Ryan – Gates McFadden – John de Lancie – Bruce Boxleitner – Robin Atkin Downes – Richard Arnold – Marc B. Lee
FedCon VIII	19–21 May 2000	Maritim Hotel Bonn	Richard Arnold – Lolita Fatjo – Richard Herd – René Auberjonois – Marina Sirtis – Michael Dorn – Jerry Doyle – Richard Biggs – Brent Spiner – Alice Krige – Robin Atkin Downes – – Denise Crosby – Tim Russ – Chase Masterson – Marc B. Lee
FedCon IX	6–8 April 2001	Maritim Hotel Bonn	LeVar Burton – Colm Meaney – Alexander Siddig – Jennifer Lien – Claudia Christian – Richard Biggs – Robert Leeshock – Von Flores – Ted Raimi – Marjorie Monaghan – Alexandra Tydings – Manu Intiraymi – Stewart Moss – Richard Arnold – Marc B. Lee
FedCon X	10–12 May 2002	Maritim Hotel Bonn	Walter Koenig – Avery Brooks – Nicole de Boer – Robert Beltran – Robert Duncan McNeill – Garrett Wang – Dominic Keating – Dirk Benedict – Herb Jefferson Jr. – BarBara Luna – Manu Intiraymi – Carolyn Seymour – Erin Gray – Richard Arnold – Judson Scott – Richard Hatch – Peter Williams – Marc B. Lee
FedCon XI	2–4 May 2003	Maritim Hotel Bonn	Vaughn Armstrong – Nana Visitor – Linda Park – John Billingsley – Ethan Phillips – Marina Sirtis – Cirroc Lofton – Anthony Head – Ray Park – Leni Parker – Jason Carter – Gil Gerard – Robert Leeshock – Tony Amendola – Tracy Scoggins – Marc B. Lee
FedCon XII	21–23 May 2004	Maritim Hotel Bonn	Nichelle Nichols – Tim Russ – Robert Picardo – Connor Trinneer – Anthony Montgomery – Grace Lee Whitney – Robert O'Reilly – J. G. Hertzler – Musetta Vander – Virginia Hey – Ed Wasser – Julie Benz – Tom Lenk – Amber Benson – Lolita Fatjo – Larry Nemecek – Richard Arnold – Marc B. Lee – Robert Vogel
FedCon XIII – The lost convention			There was no FedCon XIII. FedCon XII 2004 was followed by FedCon XIV in 2005.
FedCon XIV	6–8 May 2005	Maritim Hotel Bonn	Jolene Blalock – Dominic Keating – Andrew Robinson – Stephen Furst – Gary Graham – Corin Nemec – Clare Kramer – J. G. Hertzler – Bobbi Sue Luther – Rick Searfoss – James Horan – Monika Schnarre – Michael David Ward – Leonard Nimoy – Brent Spiner – Kevin Sorbo – Robert Vogel – Leonard McLeod – Hubert Zitt – Marc B. Lee
FedCon XV – The Undiscovered Country	19–21 May 2006	Hotel Esperanto Fulda	Patrick Kilpatrick – Walter Koenig – George Takei – Gates McFadden – Robert Beltran – Connor Trinneer – Nicole de Boer – Cirroc Lofton – Mira Furlan – Gigi Edgley – Christian Kane – Menina Fortunato – Marc Singer – Claudia Christian – Dean Haglund – Gary Jones – Clare Kramer – Andy Hallett – Tim Brazeal – Alexandra Velten – Dr. Rainer Nagel – Hubert Zitt – Richard Arnold – Marc B. Lee – Robert Vogel
FedCon XVI – Droned Heart	8–10 June 2007	Maritim Hotel Bonn	Kate Mulgrew – Jonathan Frakes – Avery Brooks – Jewel Staite – Paul McGillion – Garrett Wang – Armin Shimerman – Laura Bertram – Orli Shoshan – Robert O'Reilly – J. G. Hertzler – Suzie Plakson – Cirroc Lofton – Anthony Montgomery – Hubert Zitt – Alexandra Velten – Dr. Rainer Nagel – Robert Vogel – Marc B. Lee
FedCon XVII – The Lost World	18–20 April 2008	Maritim Hotel Bonn	Brent Spiner – Marina Sirtis – LeVar Burton – Jamie Bamber – Mary McDonnell – Bruce Boxleitner – Michael Shanks – Kevin Sorbo – Michelle Forbes – Nicki Clyne – Leah Cairns – Julie Caitlin Brown – Peter Jurasik – Steve Bacic – René Auberjonois – John de Lancie – W. Morgan Sheppard – Robert Vogel – Richard Arnold – Marc B. Lee
FedCon XVIII – The Golden Future	1–3 May 2009	Maritim Hotel Bonn	Edward James Olmos – Summer Glau – Nichelle Nichols – Colin Ferguson – Jordan Hinson – Christopher Judge – James Callis – Michael Hogan – John Billingsley – Robert Picardo – Nana Visitor – Connor Trinneer – Dominic Keating – Mark Sheppard – Marc Alaimo – Jeffrey Combs – Max Grodénchik – Erin Gray – Richard Hatch – Jonathan Woodward – Hubert Zitt – Alexandra Velten – Dr. Rainer Nagel – Richard Arnold – Mark Hildebrand – Thomas Höhl – Robert Vogel – David Messina – Marc B. Lee
FedCon XIX – Beyond Imagination	30 April – 2 May 2010	Maritim Hotel Bonn	Joe Flanigan – Luciana Carro – James Marsters – David Hewlett – Terry Farrell – Michael Dorn – Gareth David-Lloyd – Aaron Douglas – Kandyse McClure – Tahmoh Penikett – Gordon Michael Woolvett – Martha Hackett – Cliff Simon – Chase Masterson – Tsuneo Sanda – David Messina – Manu Intiraymi – Suzie Plakson – Robert Vogel – Franco Urru – James Cawley – Ed Wasser
FedCon XX – The Sci-Fi Experience	28 April – 1 May 2011	Maritim Hotel Düsseldorf	Richard Dean Anderson – Scott Bakula - Robert Duncan McNeill – Lance Henriksen – Wil Wheaton – Paul McGillion – Marina Sirtis – Jeremy Bulloch – Daniel Logan – Nicole de Boer – Sean Maher – Bonnie Piesse – Dirk Benedict – Tony Amendola – Kate Hewlett – Arlene Martel – Kate Vernon – Carel Struycken – Hubert Zitt – Lieven Litaer – Garrett Wang
FedCon XXI – The Sci-Fi Experience	17. - 20. May 2012	Maritim Hotel Düsseldorf	Richard Dean Anderson – William Shatner - Jonathan Frakes – Gates McFadden – Joe Flanigan – Walter Koenig - J. G. Hertzler - Robert O'Reilly - Nicholas Brendon - Felicia Day - Casper Van Dien - Kai Owen - Keith Szarabajka - Erick Avari - Teryl Rothery - Kavan Smith - Matthew Bennett - Jenette Goldstein - Ricco Ross - Carrie Henn - Virginia Hey - Eddie Paskey - Garrett Wang
FedCon XXII – The Sci-Fi Experience	9. – 12. May 2013	Maritim Hotel Düsseldorf	John Barrowman - Robert Beltran - Claudia Black - Ben Browder - Tracee Cocco - Casper Van Dien - Gigi Edgley - Colin Ferguson - Matt Frewer - J.G. Hertzler - Dina Meyer - Anthony Montgomery - Patrick Muldoon - Eve Myles - Jasika Nicole - Robert O'Reilly - Linda Park - Ethan Phillips - Mark Allen Shepherd - Andrea Thompson - Garrett Wang - Patti Yasutake
FedCon XXIII – The Sci-Fi Experience	29 May. - 01. June 2014	Maritim Hotel Düsseldorf	Jay Acovone - Richard Dean Anderson - Nicole de Boer - Susanne Braun - Holly Marie Combs - Tony Curran - Roxann Dawson - Shannen Doherty - Aron Eisenberg - Max Grodénchik - Natasha Henstridge - Barry Jenner - Nalini Krishan - Bai Ling - Diana Muldaur - Nichelle Nichols - Michael Shanks - Alexander Siddig - Amanda Tapping - Nana Visitor - Garrett Wang - David Warner
FedCon XXIV – The Sci-Fi Experience	21. - 24. May 2015	Maritim Hotel Düsseldorf	Rob Archer - Jonathan Del Arco - Carmen Argenziano - Colin Baker - Grant Bowler - James Callis - Aaron Douglas - Jerry Doyle - Eva Habermann - Tricia Helfer - David Hewlett - Manu Intiraymi - Bai Ling - Paul McGann - David Nykl - Edward James Olmos - Tim Russ - Jeri Ryan - Sean Young
FedCon XXV – The Sci-Fi Experience	13. - 16. May 2016	Maritim Hotel Bonn	Chase Masterson - Connor Trinneer - Dominic Keating - Ethan Phillips - George Takei - Hallie Todd - James Morrison - Julie Benz - Karl Urban - Manu Intiraymi - Marina Sirtis - Rekha Sharma - Robert Beltran - Robert Maschio - Robin Curtis - Terry Farrell - Tucker Smallwood - Walter Koenig - William Shatner -
FedCon XXVI – The Sci-Fi Experience	2. - 5. June 2017	Maritim Hotel Bonn	Chase Masterson - Marina Sirtis - Gates McFadden - Michael Dorn - John de Lancie - LeVar Burton – Colm Meaney - Denise Crosby - Casper Van Dien - David Hasselhoff - Jenna Coleman - Matt Smith - Bern Collaco - Sasha Roiz - Mark Dacascos - Hubert Zitt - Christian Humberg cancelled: Brent Spiner - Jonathan Frakes - Tia Carrere
FedCon XXVII – The Sci-Fi Experience	18. - 21. May 2018	Maritim Hotel Bonn	Jason Isaacs - Brent Spiner - Jonathan Frakes - Robert Picardo - John de Lancie - Edward James Olmos – Mary McDonnell - Tricia Helfer - James Callis - Grace Park - Michael Trucco - Rekha Sharma - Tahmoh Penikett - Katee Sackhoff - Alessandro Juliani - Aaron Douglas - Michael Hogan - Kandyse McClure - Daphne Zuniga - Zach Galligan - Cliff Simon - Brian Muir - Hubert Zitt - Robert Vogel - Christian Humberg - Anika Klüver - Lori Dungey cancelled: Karl Urban - Jamie Bamber
FedCon XXVIII – The Sci-Fi Experience	7. - 10. June 2019	Maritim Hotel Bonn	Kevin Sorbo - Bruce Boxleitner - Corin Nemec - Robert Duncan McNeill - Mira Furlan - Aaron Ashmore - Luke Macfarlane - Anson Mount - Shazad Latif - Wilson Cruz - Cas Anvar - Dominique Tipper - Frankie Adams - Shohreh Aghdashloo - Ethan Peck - Ken Leung - Wes Chatham - Steven Strait - Anthony Daniels - Benjamin Stöwe - Lori Dungey - Hubert Zitt - Christian Humberg - Lieven Litaer
FedCon XXIX – The Sci-Fi Experience	22. - 24. October 2021	Maritim Hotel Bonn	Sonequa Martin-Green – Anthony Rapp – Emily Coutts – David Ajala – Patrick Kwok-Choon – Sara Mitich – Isa Briones – Joe Flanigan – Torri Higginson – Paul McGillion – Rachel Luttrell – Jewel Staite – David Nykl – Claudia Christian – Benjamin Stöwe – Hubert Zitt cancelled: Zachary Quinto – Blu del Barrio
FedCon XXX – The Sci-Fi Experience	3. - 5. June 2022	Maritim Hotel Bonn	Simon Pegg - Christopher Eccleston - Evan Evagora - Ian Alexander - Julian Glover - Richard Brake - Michael Carter - Eric Walker - Michelle Hurd - Vaughn Armstrong - Casey Biggs - Max Grodénchik - Nana Visitor - Jonathan Frakes - Brent Spiner - John Barrowman - Sebastian Stoppe - Robert Vogel - Phillip P. Peterson – Hubert Zitt cancelled: Blu del Barrio - Annie Wersching - Ethan Phillips - John de Lancie - Guy Henry - Marina Sirtis - Mary Wiseman
FedCon XXXI – The Sci-Fi Experience	26. - 28. May 2023	Maritim Hotel Bonn	Amanda Tapping – Anna-Louise Plowman – Ben Browder – Christina Chong – Connor Trinneer – Dominic Keating – George Takei – Gigi Edgley – Jacqueline Kim – Joe Flanigan – John de Lancie – Judson Scott – Lori Dungey – Marina Sirtis – Michael Shanks – Patrick Currie – Richard Dean Anderson – Richard Poe – Simone Bailly – Terry Farrell – Teryl Rothery – Tony Amendola – Sebastian Stoppe – Hubert Zitt
FedCon XXXII – The Sci-Fi Experience	10. - 12. May 2024	Maritim Hotel Bonn	Alan van Sprang – Emily Coutts – Mary Wiseman – Anthony Rapp – Robert Picardo – Lori Dungey – Penny Johnson Jerald – J. Lee – Mark Jackson – Nicole de Boer – Ante Dekovic – Peter Macon – Adrianne Palicki – Michael Dorn – André Dae Kim – Melissa Navia – Liz Kloczowski – Anson Mount – Todd Stashwick – Sebastian Stoppe – Hubert Zitt
