= All-Con =

Annual four-day convention in Dallas, Texas, United States

- Status: Active
- Genre: Multi-genre
- Venue: Crowne Plaza North Dallas
- Locations: Dallas, Texas
- Country: USA
- Years active: 2005 to Present
- Major events: concerts, shadowcasting, costuming
- Organizer: ALL-CON, LLC
- Filing status: For Profit
- Website: http://www.all-con.org/

All-Con is a four-day convention held annually in the Dallas, Texas, area. All-Con provides an umbrella of content supporting fans of science fiction, fantasy, Renaissance, anime, costuming, theater/performing arts, mystery, art, crafts, collecting, and filmmaking. To help give back, there are several charity events at the convention every year. The All-Con motto is "We Serve The Fan Community." Since 2007, the anime programming has been provided by members of Mu Epsilon Kappa's University of North Texas chapter.

== Event History ==
Name	Location	Dates	Atten.	Notes
All-Con 2005	Sterling Hotel; Dallas, Texas	February 4–6, 2005		Guests included artist Adam Hughes, author Troy Denning, actor Bill Johnson, comedian Barry Diamond, plus Star Wars actors Gerald Home and Christine Hewett.
All-Con 2006	Sterling Hotel; Dallas, Texas	March 17–19, 2006		Guests included The Crow creator James O'Barr, artist Ben Dunn, actor Ken Feinberg, actor James Horan, actor Bill Blair, plus Star Wars actors Jay Laga'aia and Nalini Krishan.
All-Con 2007	Crowne Plaza Dallas Near Galleria-Addison; Addison, Texas	March 16–18, 2007		Guests included artist J. K. Woodward, voice actor Neil Kaplan, plus Battlestar Galactica actresses Luciana Carro and Kate Vernon.
All-Con 2008	Crowne Plaza Dallas Near Galleria-Addison; Addison, Texas	March 7–9, 2008		Guests included Battlestar Galactica actor Aaron Douglas, Return of the Jedi actors Tim Dry, Sean Crawford, and Mike Edmonds, plus Blazing Saddles actor Burton Gilliam and Who Wants to be a Superhero? contestant Tonya Kay (aka Creature).
All-Con 2009	Crowne Plaza Dallas Near Galleria-Addison; Addison, Texas	March 13–15, 2009		Guests attending included Aaron Douglas from Battlestar Galactica, Peter Mayhew (Chewbacca) from Star Wars, Ken Lally from Heroes / Albert Wesker from Resident Evil, Candace Kita from Masked Rider, and Burton Gilliam from Back to the Future Part III and Blazing Saddles. Ginny McQueen was the Cosplay Guest of Honor.
All-Con 2010	Crowne Plaza Dallas Near Galleria-Addison; Addison, Texas	March 12–14, 2010		Guests attending included actor John Billingsley, actress Anne Lockhart, comic book writer/editor Larry Hama, manga artist Kazushi Hinoki, and Japanese filmmaker Keisaku Kimura. Estimated attendance exceeded 1,600.
All-Con 2011	Crowne Plaza Dallas Near Galleria-Addison; Addison, Texas	March 18–20, 2011		The theme was "steampunk". Guests attending included Star Wars actress Orli Shoshan, Hardware Wars actress Cindy Freeling, Battlestar Galactica actors Anne Lockhart and Richard Hatch, plus voice actor Neil Kaplan.
All-Con 2012	Crowne Plaza Dallas Near Galleria-Addison; Addison, Texas	March 16–18, 2012	3,000	
All-Con 2013	Crowne Plaza Dallas Near Galleria-Addison; Addison, Texas	March 8–10, 2013		Special guests included actors Stephen Stanton, Camden Toy, Kathy Coleman, Marilyn Ghigliotti, Anne Lockhart, Rick Fitts, Michael Gregory, Tim Taylor, and Samantha Newark.
All-Con 2014	Crowne Plaza Dallas Near Galleria-Addison; Addison, Texas	March 13–16, 2014		
All-Con 2015	Crowne Plaza Dallas Near Galleria-Addison; Addison, Texas	March 12–15, 2015		Special guests included Neil Kaplan, and All-Con hosted over 300 various events over the course of the convention.
All-Con 2016	Westin Dallas Park Central; Dallas, Texas	March 17–20, 2016		The convention once again contained over 300 events, as well as a meeting place for the Star Wars Fan group the 501st Legion. Special guests included Brian Muir, Gigi Edgley, Paul Blake, Chuck Huber, Tim Lawrence, Neil Kaplan, Russ Adams, Michael H. Price, and Marshall Barnes.
All-Con 2017	Crowne Plaza Dallas Near Galleria-Addison; Addison, Texas	March 16–19, 2017		
All-Con 2018 (Year XIV: Regeneration)	Renaissance Dallas Addison Hotel (previously named the "InterContinental Hotel"); Addison, Texas	March 15–18, 2018		
All-Con 2019	Crowne Plaza Dallas Near Galleria-Addison; Addison, Texas	March 14–17, 2019		
All-Con 2020	Crowne Plaza Dallas Near Galleria-Addison; Addison, Texas	March 12, 2020		All-Con 2020 was originally scheduled as a 4-day convention from March 12–15, 2020. However, due to countywide public health concerns of the COVID-19 pandemic, the event ended abruptly on Friday, March 13, 2020, in line with the judicial order from the County of Dallas.
All-Con 2021	Crowne Plaza Dallas Near Galleria-Addison; Addison, Texas	March 18–21, 2021		
