= Starbase Indy =

Science fiction convention

- Status: Active
- Genre: Star Trek / Science Fiction / STEM
- Dates: Thanksgiving Weekend
- Venue: Indianapolis Marriott East
- Location: Indianapolis, Indiana
- Country: United States
- Inaugurated: 1988
- Most recent: 2025
- Next event: November 27th-29th, 2026
- Attendance: ~500
- Organizer: Starbase Indy a 501(c)(3) Corporation
- Filing status: 501(c)(3)
- Website: www.starbaseindy.org

Starbase Indy or SBI, is a science fiction convention held annually on the Friday through Sunday of Thanksgiving Weekend, in Indianapolis, IN . While drawing attendees mainly from the Midwestern United States, SBI has had attendees from as far away as Germany and Australia!

Revised in 2017, our mission is "Celebrating Star Trek's vision of the future by promoting humanitarianism and STEM education today." As an organization, we actively work to promote Gene Roddenberry's vision of a hopeful future. SBI reorganized as public benefit corporation with the purpose of raising the interest and improving the knowledge and skills of all ages in science, technology, engineering, and mathematics through engagement in public discussion, lectures, and hands-on programs during a yearly event in November. In addition, SBI also works to eliminate prejudice and discrimination through intentional inclusivity, promotion of diversity, and specifically designed activities.

SBI has also launched a related podcast, the Starbase Indy Podcast, which interviews people who are inspired by Star Trek or science fiction to work toward a hopeful future in the real world. The podcast has included actors, writers, artists, directors, scientists, academics, and researchers, many of whom have spoken at the live event in November.

== History ==
The idea for Starbase Indy germinated after Indianapolis Star Trek fans attended a convention in St. Louis, and decided to create their own convention. The first Starbase Indy was held in March 1988 in the Adam's Mark Hotel, and the main guest-stars were Michael Dorn, who portrayed Worf in Star Trek: The Next Generation, and Mark Lenard, who played Sarek on Star Trek: The Original Series. The convention then moved to the Marriott East in Indianapolis, and the now-traditional Thanksgiving weekend.

Beginning in 1989, the convention adopted "The Next Generation" as part of its name, then "The Third Generation" in 1990, and so on. With "Starbase Indy: The Eighth Generation" in 1995, the local organizing committee ended the initial run of Starbase Indy. In 2004, after a professional convention-company bowed out, a new fan-run committee organized "Starbase Indy: the Ninth Generation." In 2008 Vulkon Entertainment, which had planned to take over the convention, bowed out days before the event. Local fans put together a one-day event, known as Freekon, and later in 2009 began meeting monthly to plan the 2009 Starbase Indy convention. The local organizing-committee has continued the Thanksgiving-weekend tradition ever since.

For 2011, due to the hotel schedule, the convention had to be moved to Dec. 9–11. For 2012, the convention returned to its three-day Thanksgiving-weekend tradition. In 2015, Starbase Indy returned to its original home, now known as the Wyndham Indianapolis West.

In 2017, Starbase Indy began a rebranding effort, not only reorganizing as a 501(c)(3), but also adopting a new mission statement, "Celebrating Star Trek's vision of the future by promoting humanitarianism and STEM education today." While continuing the "Geek Family Thanksgiving Tradition" convention programming, organizers also work to increase the amount of science-programming available at the convention. In 2021, the live event was back at the Indianapolis Marriott East, where it is expected to stay through 2026.

== Guest stars ==
2023

- Larry Nemecek
- Dr. Mohamed Noor
- Bonnie Gordon
- Moxie Ann Magnus

2022

- Bill Blair
- Sandy Gimpel
- Bonnie Gordon
- Dr. Bill Sullivan
- Jennifer Usellis
- Aaron Waltke
- Demetrius Witherspoon

2021

- Tracee Lee Cocco
- Gary Frank
- Juniper Jairala
- Boldly Go!
- Jennifer Usellis
- Geeks and Groves

2020 No event held due to pandemic

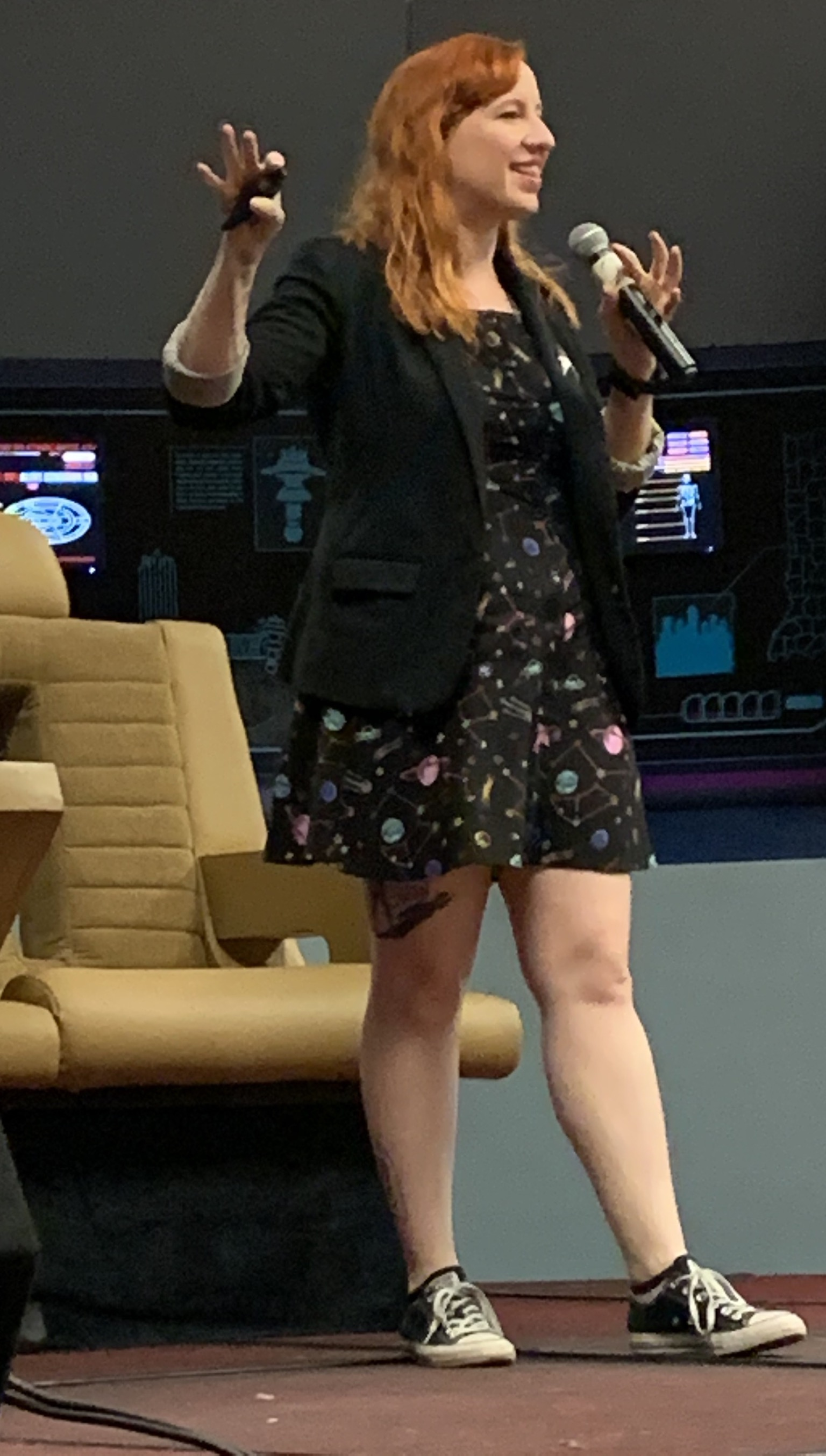
Dr. Erin Macdonald lecturing in Starbase Indy 2019.

2019

- Mary Chieffo
- Tracee Lee Cocco
- Mimi Craven
- Keith DeCandido
- Chris Doohan
- Dr. Erin Macdonald

2018

- Breakfast Anytime
- Bill Blair
- Sandy Gimpel
- Francois Chau
- Five Year Mission
- Jennifer Usellis
- Dr. Erin Macdonald
- Moxie Ann Magnus
- Lawrence M. Schoen
- Carl Taliaferro
- The ShakeUps

2017

- John Billingsley
- Bonnie Friedericy
- Robert O'Reilly
- Kyle Hill
- Dr. Mohamed Noor

2016

- Sandy Gimpel
- Dominic Keating
- Chase Masterson
- Larry Nemecek
- Marc Okrand
- Garrett Wang

2015

- Jay Acovone
- Lee Arenberg
- Jeffrey Combs
- Beverley Elliott
- Eric Pierpoint
- Natalia Nogulich
- Ona Grauer
- Chris Nowland

2014

- Aron Eisenberg
- Lolita Fatjo
- Max Grodénchik
- Paul McGillion
- David Nykl
- John Paladin
- David Reddick
- Kate Vernon
- Nana Visitor

2013

- Jay Acovone
- René Auberjonois
- Teryl Rothery
- Suzie Plakson
- Armin Shimerman
- Musetta Vander
- John Paladin
- David Reddick

2012

- Alexis Cruz
- Nicole de Boer
- J. G. Hertzler
- Larry Nemecek
- Robert O'Reilly
- John Paladin
- David Reddick
- Dr. David Wolf

2011

- Jay Acovone
- John Billingsley
- Bonita Friedericy
- Morgan Gendel
- Dean Haglund
- Tony Todd

2010

- Crystal Allen
- Manu Intiraymi
- Ethan Phillips
- Tim Russ
- Dr. David Wolf

2009

- Logan Huffman
- Jeff Rector
- David Reddick
- W. Morgan Shepherd W. Morgan Sheppard
- Garrett Wang

2008

- Luke Ski
- David Reddick

2007

- Ray Park
- David Reddick
- Luke Ski

2006

- Tim Brazeal
- Denise Crosby
- Alexis Cruz
- Deborah Downey
- Gary Graham
- Jonathan Frakes
- Dean Haglund
- Mary Linda Rapelye
- David Reddick
- Katee Sackhoff

2005

- Vaughn Armstrong
- Tim Brazeal
- Richard Coyle
- Deborah Downey
- Aron Eisenberg
- Lolita Fatjo
- Menina Fortunato
- Max Grodénchik
- James Horan
- Herbert Jefferson Jr.
- Dominic Keating
- Chase Masterson
- Larry Nemecek
- David Reddick

2004

- Jeffrey Combs
- Deborah Downey
- James Horan
- Anthony Montgomery
- Connor Trinneer
- Garrett Wang

Earlier Years

Besides Michael Dorn, other guest stars at Starbase Indy have included Marina Sirtis and Majel Barrett Roddenberry in 1989; Nichelle Nichols in 1991; Leonard Nimoy in 1992; Robert Picardo and Dwight Schultz in 1995.

== Convention activities ==
Starbase Indy is run by The Starbase, a 501c3 not for profit celebrating Star Trek's vision of the future through humanitarianism and STEM education today. The funds collected through badge sales, merchandise sales, and a silent auction support bringing more interactive, engaging, and educational activities to the annual in-person event, and paying artists and performers for their involvement. All of the organizing activities are performed by volunteers.

Speakers at the event range from performers, creators, scientists, academics, and more. A comprehensive list of past program sessions can be found in the archived program guides available online for prior years, starting in 2018.

- /2018
- /2019
- /2021
- /2022

Starbase Indy has traditionally included the typical Q&A sessions with guest stars, a dealers’ room, panel discussions on science and science fiction topics, a masquerade, a dance, and appearances by scientists and authors. Programming in the past has included sessions on screenwriting, prop building, building robots, filk music, and meetings for Star Trek clubs.

== See also ==
- Science fiction fandom
- List of science fiction conventions
