= Mary Oyaya =

Kenyan actress

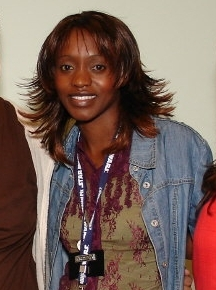
- Oyaya in 2007
- Born: Mary Oyaya; Mombasa, Kenya
- Education: University of New South Wales
- Occupations: Actor, model
- Years active: 1993–present

Mary Oyaya is a Kenyan actress and model. She is best known for the role of Jedi Master Luminara Unduli in the American blockbuster film, Star Wars: Episode II – Attack of the Clones.

== Personal life ==
She was born in Mombasa, Kenya as the eldest child in a family of four siblings. She received her master's degree in International Relations and then completed a second master's degree in International Social Development, both from the University of New South Wales.

After moving to Australia, she continued to appear in television commercials and advertisements.

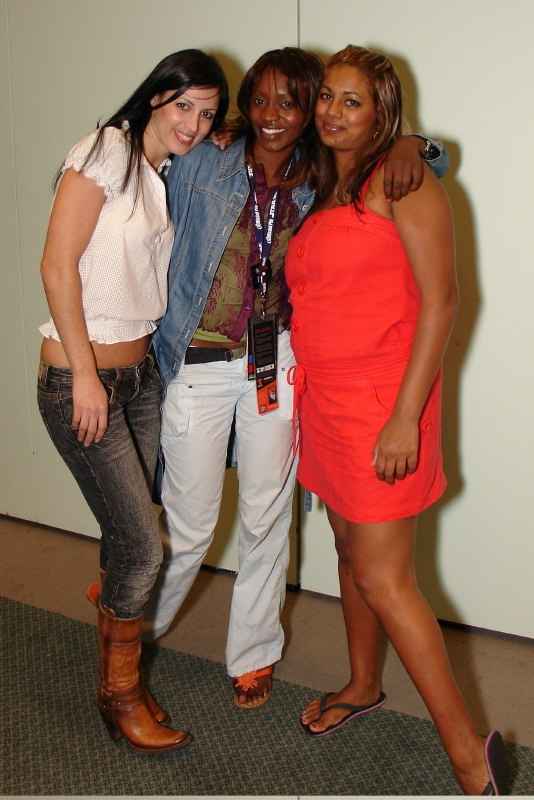
Orli Shoshan (left), Mary Oyaya (middle), & Nalini Krishan (right)

== Career ==
She has worked for the United Nations since a young age. She mainly worked with refugees in Australia for several NGOs. While studying, she pursued a modeling career. She featured in several fashion magazines such as 'CAT' and 'S'. In the meantime, she appeared in advertisements with Salvatore Ferragamo and Gucci sunglasses, Chanel and Jan Logan jewelry and footwear with Sergio Rossi.

Mary has starred in television commercials for Telstra Communications, Hewlett Packard Bell, and various sports advertisements. In 1999, she acted in the SciFi network TV series, Farscape. During this period, she ventured into film productions, such as Lost Souls and Down and Under. In 2002, she appeared as Jedi Master Luminara Unduli in the American blockbuster film Star Wars: Episode II – Attack of the Clones.

== Filmography ==
| Year | Film | Role | Genre | Ref. |
|---|---|---|---|---|
| 1999 | Farscape | | TV series | |
| 2000 | Down & Under | | Film | |
| 2000 | Lost Souls | | Film | |
| 2002 | Star Wars: Episode II – Attack of the Clones | Luminara Unduli | Film | |
