= Anime club =

Organization that discusses/celebrates Japanese animation

An anime club is an organization that meets to discuss, show, and promote anime in a local community setting and can also focus on broadening Japanese cultural understanding. Anime clubs are increasingly found at universities and high schools. Organizers may also use public meeting spaces such as a library or a government center. Many anime club attendees identify themselves as otaku. Although the core of anime club attendees are in their twenties, there are generally no age requirements. Adults in their fifties and sixties and teenagers also attend.

== Activities ==
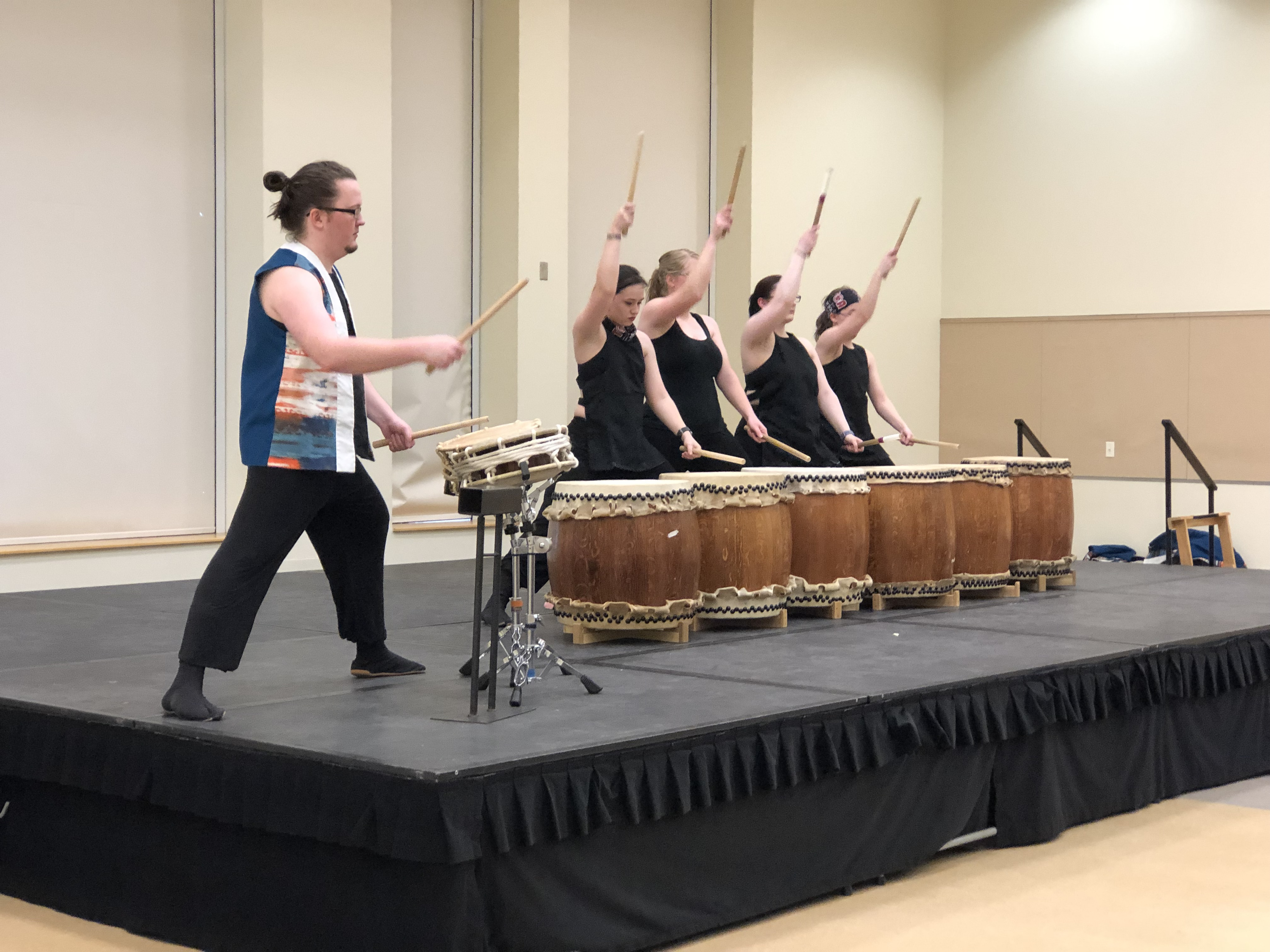
Kazenodaichi Taiko, a Taiko ensemble based at Bowling Green, Ohio performing at a convention organized by a university Anime Club

Anime club meetings can occur on a weekly or monthly basis. In addition to viewing anime, clubs engage in other activities such as viewing anime music videos, reading manga, karaoke and cosplaying. Many clubs host online forums to further foster community interaction, and feature a library to lend books and manga to members. Participants of an anime club often are also involved in volunteering and organization of local anime conventions.

Dependent on the scope of the club, activities can also have a broader range, to include playing of table top games such as shogi, go, and mahjong. Outside activities include sake tasting and visits to cultural events such as National Cherry Blossom Festival or a kendo demonstration.

== Anime showings ==
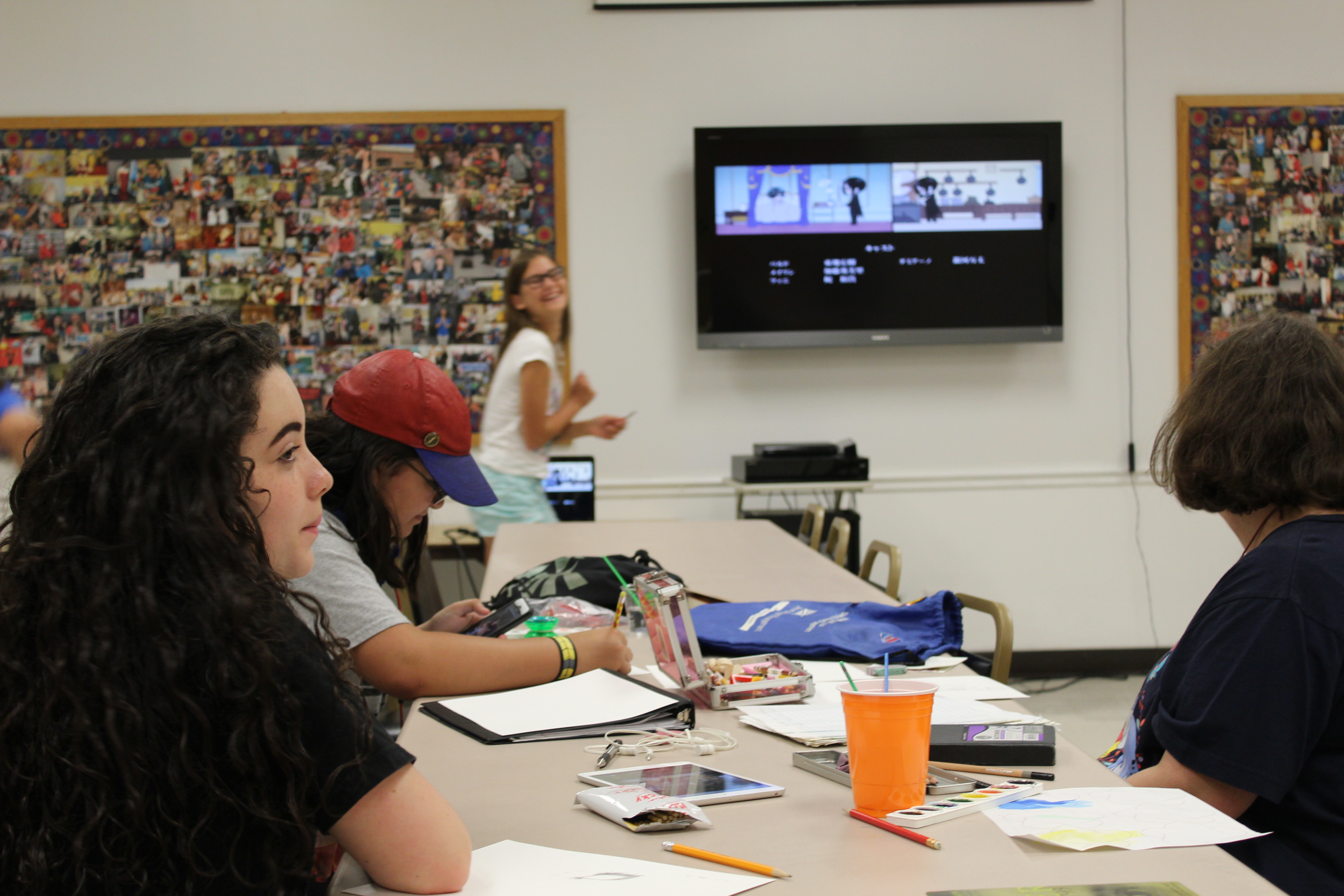
An anime club at a library viewing anime. A girl is drawing and Pocky can be seen on a table.

Typically anime clubs exhibit shows in their original Japanese language track with English subtitles. Dependent upon policy of the club, anime fansubs, official subtitling, or localized dubs can be shown.

Larger clubs can have multiple viewing rooms. Usually one room features localized anime and the other fansubs. The fansub room can also be known as the 'divy' room, named after the popular video codec.

Due to the long running and episodic nature of some anime, exhibition is scheduled in blocks with breaks. Often, a twenty six episode series will be screened over the period of several months.

There are also informal policies in some club circles regarding the total length of a viewed show. For example, Bleach and Inuyasha run for 366 and 167 (or 191 with the Inuyasha: The Final Act) episodes respectively. At this length, a club may be perpetually showing episodes, effectively depriving another show of that spot. Additionally, it may be difficult for new members of the club to follow or become interested in a storyline that has already progressed far.

== Public exhibition ==
When gathering in a public place to show licensed media, written permission from the domestic rights holder is required. This is known as Public Performance Rights or exhibition rights.

North American anime licensors, such as Funimation and Bandai Entertainment have established programs to help facilitate public screenings of their licensed content at anime clubs.

== See also ==
- Genshiken – a manga and anime featuring a college anime club.
- Otaku no Video – comedy anime spoofing the life and culture of otaku
- Community centre – a common place for anime clubs to meet
- Mu Epsilon Kappa – a national society of anime clubs in the United States
