= List of Star Wars prequel trilogy characters =

This incomplete list contains only the major characters and storylines featured in the three films of the Star Wars prequel trilogy.

== Background ==
The Star Wars prequel trilogy, colloquially referred to as "the prequels", is a series of epic space-opera films written and directed by George Lucas. It was produced by Lucasfilm Ltd. and distributed by 20th Century Fox. The trilogy was released from 1999 to 2005 and is set before the original Star Wars trilogy (1977–83), chronologically making it the first act of the Skywalker saga.

The prequel trilogy received mixed reviews, generally improving in critical reception with each installment. Common criticisms surrounded the over-reliance on computer-generated imagery and green screens, melodramatic and wooden dialogue (including scenes of romance between Anakin and Padmé), slow-paced political scenes, and the comic relief character of Jar Jar Binks, whose role was reduced after the first film due to how fans hated him. (Note: The character was so disliked, even by fans, that actor Ahmed Best said he contemplated suicide.)

Several alien characters introduced in The Phantom Menace have been subject to accusations of racial stereotypes. Jar Jar is asserted to caricature a stereotyped Jamaican, while the Gungan species at large has been said to suggest a primitive African tribe. The greedy Neimoidians of the Trade Federation have been noted as resembling East Asian stereotypes with some deliberately given Thai accents, and Watto's mannerisms and hooked nose appearance were based on footage of Alec Guinness as the Jewish character Fagin in the 1948 film Oliver Twist, leading some to assert that the slave-owning character is a Jewish stereotype. Lucas denied all accusations of racial stereotypes.

Many expressed their disappointment with the trilogy's portrayal of Anakin Skywalker, particularly calling the writing weak and the dialogue wooden, although Hayden Christensen's performance in the third film was much more well-received. Contrarily, Ewan McGregor's portrayal of Obi-Wan Kenobi, following in the footsteps of Alec Guinness, has been generally praised. Natalie Portman has expressed her disappointment with the trilogy's negative reception, saying that "When something has that much anticipation it can almost only disappoint." She also acknowledged that "With the perspective of time, it's been re-evaluated by a lot of people who actually really love them now."

== Main cast ==
List indicators

This section includes characters who will appear or have appeared in the series.

- An empty grey cell indicates the character was not in the film, or that the character's official presence has not yet been confirmed.
- ^{C} indicates a cameo role.
- ^{E} indicates an appearance not included in the theatrical cut.
- ^{U} indicates an uncredited appearance.
- ^{V} indicates a voice-only role.
- ^{Y} indicates a younger version of the character.

Character	The Phantom Menace (1999)	Attack of the Clones (2002)	Revenge of the Sith (2005)
Qui-Gon Jinn	Liam Neeson		
Obi-Wan Kenobi	Ewan McGregor	Ewan McGregor	Ewan McGregor
Padmé Amidala	Natalie Portman	Natalie Portman	Natalie Portman
Anakin Skywalker / Darth Vader	Jake Lloyd	Hayden Christensen	Hayden Christensen
Palpatine / Darth Sidious	Ian McDiarmid	Ian McDiarmid	Ian McDiarmid
Jar Jar Binks	Ahmed Best	Ahmed Best	Ahmed Best
C-3PO	Anthony Daniels	Anthony Daniels	Anthony Daniels
R2-D2	Kenny Baker	Kenny Baker	Kenny Baker
Shmi Skywalker	Pernilla August	Pernilla August	
Yoda	Frank Oz	Frank Oz	Frank Oz
Mace Windu	Samuel L. Jackson	Samuel L. Jackson	Samuel L. Jackson
Darth Maul	Ray Park		
Sabé	Keira Knightley		
Count Dooku		Christopher Lee	Christopher Lee
Bail Organa		Jimmy Smits	Jimmy Smits
Chewbacca			Peter Mayhew

== Main characters ==
=== Qui-Gon Jinn ===
Qui-Gon Jinn is a Jedi Master partnered with his apprentice Obi-Wan Kenobi. Tasked with protecting the Queen of Naboo, Padmé Amidala, Jinn discovers Anakin Skywalker as a slave on the desert planet of Tatooine. Known for his unconventional methods (that have cost him a seat on the Jedi Council), Jinn implores the Council to allow him to train Anakin despite already having an apprentice in Kenobi, and Anakin being too old to begin the training. When Amidala returns to Naboo to liberate her people from the Trade Federation blockade, Jinn is mortally wounded in a lightsaber duel against Darth Maul. With his dying words, he tasks Kenobi with training Anakin.

The character was portrayed by Liam Neeson in The Phantom Menace, and archival audio is heard as Yoda meditates in Attack of the Clones.

=== Obi-Wan Kenobi ===
Obi-Wan Kenobi is a Jedi Master and former student of Qui-Gon Jinn whose training is completed by Master Yoda. Kenobi trains Anakin Skywalker to be a Jedi per his former master's dying wish. The two form an extremely close friendship despite Skywalker's penchant for breaking the rules. Obi-Wan confronts Anakin on the volcanic planet Mustafar after discovering that Anakin has fallen to the dark side. Obi-Wan leaves Anakin for dead, unaware that he survived the battle. He retreats to Tatooine after the Jedi are wiped out.

The character was portrayed by Ewan McGregor in all three films.

=== Padmé Amidala ===
Padmé Amidala served as the queen of Naboo, elected to the position at the age of fourteen. After leading her people to freedom following the Invasion of Naboo, she is elected as the planet's senator once her term as queen expires. She secretly marries Anakin Skywalker, and following his turn to the dark side, she dies in childbirth with twins- Luke and Leia.

The character was portrayed by Natalie Portman in all three films.

=== Anakin Skywalker / Darth Vader ===
Anakin Skywalker is a powerful Jedi Knight believed by some to be the "Chosen One" who will bring balance to the Force. While headstrong, he forms a close friendship with his mentor Obi-Wan Kenobi. Skywalker descends towards the dark side of the Force after his mother is killed by Tusken Raiders, and he begins having dreams that something similar will happen to Padmé, whom he secretly married. Skywalker is manipulated by Palpatine (actually the Sith Lord, Darth Sidious) into becoming his apprentice, Darth Vader.

The character was portrayed as a child by Jake Lloyd in The Phantom Menace, and as a young man by Hayden Christensen in Attack of the Clones and Revenge of the Sith. James Earl Jones returned to voice Darth Vader once the character is entombed in the life support suit following the duel on Mustafar.

=== Palpatine / Darth Sidious ===
Palpatine is a senator from Naboo who ascends to become the Chancellor of the Republic following the vote of no confidence in Chancellor Valorum during the Naboo crisis. However, his true identity is the Sith Lord called Darth Sidious. As both Chancellor of the Republic and master to Count Dooku (leader of the Separatist factions), Palpatine puppeteers a never-ending war between the two factions to consolidate power. When Anakin Skywalker and the Jedi discover his true identity, Palpatine successfully manipulates Anakin into becoming his apprentice, but not before becoming heavily deformed by Mace Windu. Palpatine uses the attack to declare himself Emperor and reorganize the Republic into the Galactic Empire.

The character was portrayed by Ian McDiarmid, reprising his role from the original trilogy.

=== Jar Jar Binks ===
Jar Jar Binks is a Gungan from Naboo who was previously banished from his home due to his clumsiness. By the end of the first film, he is welcomed back by the other Gungans and later serves as a representative for them in the Galactic Senate.

The character was portrayed by Ahmed Best in all three films.

=== C-3PO ===
C-3PO is a protocol droid built by Anakin Skywalker on Tatooine. He eventually comes under the ownership of Senator Amidala. After her death, she is given to Captain Antilles, who has C-3PO's memory wiped.

The character was portrayed by Anthony Daniels, reprising his role from the original trilogy.

=== R2-D2 ===
R2-D2 is an astromech droid serving the government of Naboo and later as Anakin's personal companion.

The character was portrayed by Kenny Baker, reprising his role from the original trilogy.

=== Shmi Skywalker ===
Shmi Skywalker is the mother of Anakin Skywalker, who tells Qui-Gon Jinn that there was no father. She is later married to Cliegg Lars before her death at the hands of the Tusken Raiders.

The character was portrayed by Pernilla August in the first two films.

=== Yoda ===
Yoda is a Jedi Master and leader of the High Council. Considered the wisest of the Jedi, he is the former master of Dooku. Yoda is one of the few Jedi to survive Order 66, and he attempts to destroy Emperor Palpatine in the climax of the third film, but ultimately fails and goes into exile on the remote planet Dagobah.

The character was portrayed by Frank Oz, reprising his role from the original trilogy.

=== Mace Windu ===
Mace Windu is a Jedi Master and member of the High Council, second only to Yoda. He confronts Palpatine after Anakin discovers the Chancellor is a Sith Lord. Windu defeats Palpatine, but Anakin intervenes, allowing the Sith to kill Windu.

The character was portrayed by Samuel L. Jackson.

=== Darth Maul ===
Darth Maul is a Zabrak warrior and Palpatine's first apprentice and also the first Sith to be encountered in over one thousand years. He is sliced in half by Obi-Wan Kenobi on Naboo.

The character was portrayed by Ray Park in The Phantom Menace.

=== Nute Gunray ===
Nute Gunray is a Neimoidian businessman who is the leader of the Trade Federation, a corrupt megacorporation. Under Palpatine's orders, Gunray leads the Invasion of Naboo, a manufactured crisis which allows Palpatine to gain power in the Senate. Gunray is betrayed after his usefulness to the Sith expires, and Palpatine dispatches Anakin to assassinate Gunray and the other Separatist leaders.

The character was portrayed by Silas Carson.

=== Count Dooku ===
Count Dooku is a former Jedi who was the apprentice of Yoda and the master of Qui-Gon Jinn before he left the Jedi Order. He then becomes Palpatine's second Sith apprentice, playing an integral role in the development of the clone army and he leads the Separatist Alliance against the Republic in a proxy war. Dooku is betrayed by Palpatine, who ensures that Anakin kills Dooku and later replaces him as his apprentice.

The character was portrayed by Christopher Lee in Attack of the Clones and Revenge of the Sith.

=== Bail Organa ===
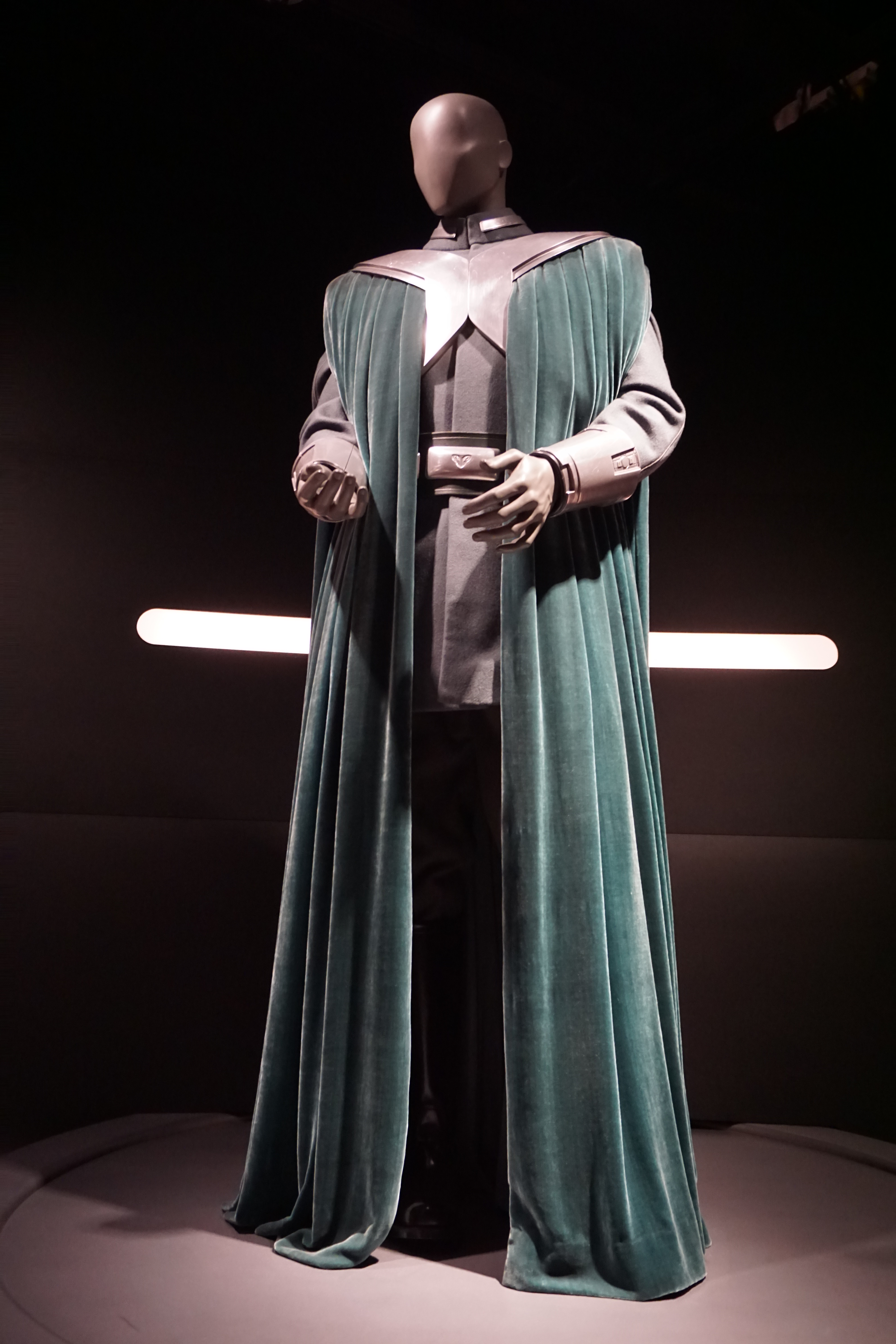
Bail Organa's robes as they appear in Star Wars: Episode III – Revenge of the Sith

Bail Organa (né Prestor) is the senator from Alderaan, and one of the leading voices to resist the growing consolidation of power by Chancellor Palpatine, laying the groundwork for the Rebel Alliance. He is married to Breha Organa, the Queen of Alderaan. They adopt Leia after her mother's death.

The character was primarily portrayed by Jimmy Smits; casting director Robin Gurland had already thought of him for the role before Smits' agents reached out. Breha was portrayed by Rebecca Jackson Mendoza. In animation, Bail Organa is voiced by Phil LaMarr in Star Wars: The Clone Wars (2008-2020), Star Wars Rebels (2014-2018), Star Wars: The Bad Batch (2021-2024), Star Wars: Tales of the Jedi (2022).

Due to scheduling issues, Smits was not able to reprise his role in the second season of Andor. Instead, Benjamin Bratt was recast as Bail, an idea brought up by Lucasfilm president Kathleen Kennedy. Andor creator Tony Gilroy said he intentionally put Bail in the episode "What a Festive Evening" to get the recasting conversation out of the way for the next week's drop of episodes. About Bratt's performance, Gilroy said "It was wonderful to have Benjamin to work with. He's such a beautiful actor, got this stature and this kind of gravitas". Bratt had tried to get featured the wedding sequence in episode "Harvest", but Gilroy declined the idea, saying that "It's far too late for that". Regarding the recasting in Andor, Molly Brizzell of Screen Rant thought the recasting was "best course of action for the franchise" and that "it sets an important precedent". Madeline Laprezio of Comicbook.com said that Bail's recasting along with Baylan Skoll after the death of Ray Stevenson, was "the right direction" instead of using CGI. Lewis Glazebrook of Screen Rant said Bratt's performance brought "the right amount of warmth, humor, and subtle rebellion" for the character.

The character was first introduced in Star Wars: Episode II – Attack of the Clones (2002) where he serves as the Senator of Alderaan in the Galactic Republic. Bail was going to debut in Star Wars: Episode I – The Phantom Menace (1999), portrayed by Adrian Dunbar, but the scenes he was featured were ultimately cut. The character is first mentioned in Star Wars: Episode IV – A New Hope (1977) when R2-D2 plays Leia Organa's message, which she delivers on behalf of her father. Bail later dies off-screen in the film when Alderaan is destroyed.

=== Chewbacca ===
Chewbacca is a Wookiee soldier who fights against the Separatist army on his home planet of Kashyyyk.

The character was portrayed by Peter Mayhew, reprising his role from the original trilogy.

=== General Grievous ===
Grievous is a cyborg warrior who is the leader of the Separatist droid armies. A ferocious fighter trained by Dooku, he possesses a range of lightsabers stolen from Jedi which he has killed. Grievous is defeated by Obi-Wan Kenobi at the end of the Clone Wars.

The character was voiced by Matthew Wood in Revenge of the Sith.

== Other notable characters ==
=== Naboo ===
- Queen Apailana (Keisha Castle-Hughes) – the ruler of Naboo during the transition from the Republic to the Empire
- Sio Bibble (Oliver Ford Davies) – governor of Naboo
- Dormé (Rose Byrne) – one of Padmé Amidala's handmaidens
- Queen Jamillia (Ayesha Dharker) – Amidala's successor and Apailana's predecessor as the ruler of Naboo
- Ric Olié (Ralph Brown) – leader of Bravo Flight, pilot of the Naboo Royal Starship
- Captain Panaka (Hugh Quarshie) – Queen Amidala's protector during the Trade Federation crisis
- Boss Nass (Brian Blessed) – the proud leader of the Gungans
- Sabé (Keira Knightley) – one of Padmé Amidala's handmaidens and her primary decoy
- Captain Tarpals (Steve Speirs) – leader of the Gungan Grand Army
- Captain Typho (Jay Laga'aia) – head of Amidala's security detail

=== Tatooine ===
- Fodesinbeed Annodue (Greg Proops and Scott Capurro) – also known as Fode & Beed, the two-headed Troig celebrity podracing announcer
- Owen and Beru Lars (Joel Edgerton and Bonnie Piesse) – Anakin's step-brother and sister-in-law following Cliegg Lars' marriage to Shmi Skywalker; entrusted with the care of Luke Skywalker following the death of Padmé, the fall of Anakin, and the rise of the Empire
- Cliegg Lars (Jack Thompson) – moisture farmer and father to Owen Lars, freed Shmi Skywalker from Watto and eventually married her
- Sebulba (Lewis MacLeod) – a Dug podracer who frequently antagonizes young Anakin
- Aurra Sing (Michonne Bourriague) – Palliduvan bounty hunter who frequents the podracing tournaments on Tatooine
- Watto (Andy Secombe) – a Toydarian mechanic who owned Anakin and his mother Shmi on Tatooine

=== Republic Leadership ===
- Ask Aak (Steven Boyle, Paul Spence) – Gran senator representing Malastare
- Mas Amedda (Jerome Blake, David Bowers) – Chagrian politician and one of the few to know Palpatine's true identity
- Tion Medon (Bruce Spence) – Pau'an politication held hostage by Grievous on Utapau
- Sly Moore (Sandi Finlay) – Umbaran aid to Palpatine
- Baron Papanoida (George Lucas) – Pantoran chairman
- Orn Free Taa (Matt Rowan) – a Twi'lek senator
- Tarfful (Michael Kingma) – Wookiee chieftain and general
- Finis Valorum (Terence Stamp) – the Chancellor who preceded Palpatine, viewed as weak and ineffective

=== Coruscant ===
- Dexter Jettster (Ronald Falk) – Besalisk owner of Dex's Diner and friend of Obi-Wan Kenobi
- Zam Wesell (Leeanna Walsman) – shapeshifting Clawdite bounty hunter

=== Jedi ===
- Stass Allie (Lily Nyamwasa) – Tholothian Jedi Master
- Depa Billaba (Dipika O'Neill Joti) – Chalactan Jedi Master
- Kit Fisto (Zachariah Jensen in Attack of the Clones, Ben Cooke in Revenge of the Sith) – Nautolan Jedi Master
- Adi Gallia (Gin Clarke) – Tholothian Jedi Master
- Zett Jukassa (Jett Lucas) – Jedi Padawan who died during the raid on the Temple
- Agen Kolar (Tux Akindoyeni) – Iridonian Zabrak Jedi Master
- Eeth Koth (Hassani Shapi) – Iridonian Zabrak Jedi Master
- Plo Koon (Alan Ruscoe, Matt Sloan) – Kel Dor Jedi Master
- Ki-Adi-Mundi (Silas Carson) – Cerean Jedi Master
- Jocasta Nu (Alethea McGrath) – librarian at the Jedi Temple on Coruscant
- Barriss Offee (Nalini Krishan) – Mirialan Jedi Padawan
- Even Piell (Michaela Cottrel) – Lannik Jedi Master
- Yarael Poof (Michelle Taylor) – Quermian Jedi Master
- Oppo Rancisis (Jerome Blake) – Thisspiasian Jedi Master
- Aayla Secura (Amy Allen) – Twi'lek Jedi Knight
- Shaak Ti (Orli Shoshan) – Togruta Jedi Master
- Saesee Tiin (Khan Bonfils in The Phantom Menace, Jesse Jensen in Attack of the Clones, Kenji Oates in Revenge of the Sith) – Iktotchi Jedi Master
- Coleman Trebor – Vurk Jedi Master
- Luminara Unduli (Mary Oyaya) – Mirialan Jedi Master
- Yaddle (Phil Eason, puppeteer) – female Jedi master of the same species of Yoda, would later be voiced by Bryce Dallas Howard in Tales of the Jedi

=== Kamino ===
- Boba Fett (Daniel Logan) – Clone son of Jango Fett; an exact copy of Jango who becomes the famous bounty hunter in the original trilogy
- Jango Fett (Temuera Morrison) – Mandalorian bounty hunter and genetic template for the clone army. Morrison also portrays and voices the clones:
  - Appo (CC-1119) – leads the 501st Legion with Vader to the Jedi Temple
  - Bacara (CC-1138) – Ki-Adi-Mundi's clone commander on Mygeeto
  - Bly (CC-5052) – Aayla Secura's clone commander on Felucia
  - Cody (CC-2224) – Obi-Wan Kenobi’s clone commander on Utapau
  - Gree (CC-1004) – Luminara Unduli's clone commander on Kashyyyk, directed to kill Master Yoda during Order 66
  - Jag (CT-55/11-9009) – Plo Koon's wingman on Cato Neimoidia
  - Neyo (CC-8826) – Stass Allie's clone commander on Saleucami
  - Odd Ball (CC-2237) – flight leader during the Battle of Coruscant
  - Thire (CC-4477) – shock trooper on Coruscant
- Lama Su (Anthony Phelan) – Prime Minister of Kamino
- Taun We (Rena Owen) – Kaminoan administrative aid

=== Separatist Leadership ===
- Passel Argente (Marty Wetherill, Steven Boyle) – Koorivar Magistrate of the Corporate Alliance funding the Separatist movement
- Lott Dod (Silas Carson, Toby Longworth) – Neimoidian who represented the Trade Federation in the Senate
- Rune Haako (Jerome Blake, James Taylor, Alan Ruscoe, Chris Truswell, Sandy Thompson) – Neimoidian official who worked closely with Viceroy Gunray
- San Hill – Muun Chairman of the InterGalactic Banking Clan
- Shu Mai – Gossam Presidente of the Commerce Guild
- Poggle the Lesser (portrayed by Marton Csokas, voiced by Ernie Fosselius) – Archduke of Geonosis who controlled the battle droid factories and oversaw the preliminary designs for the Death Star
- Wat Tambor (Chris Truswell) – Skakoan Foreman of the Techno Union and Executive of Baktoid Armor Workshop before and during the Clone Wars

== See also ==
- List of Star Wars original trilogy characters
