= Brazeal =

Brazeal is a surname. Notable people with the surname include:

- Aurelia E. Brazeal (born 1943), American diplomat
- Tim Brazeal (born 1961), known for a controversial campaign to save the TV series Star Trek Enterprise from cancellation
