= Five Year Mission =

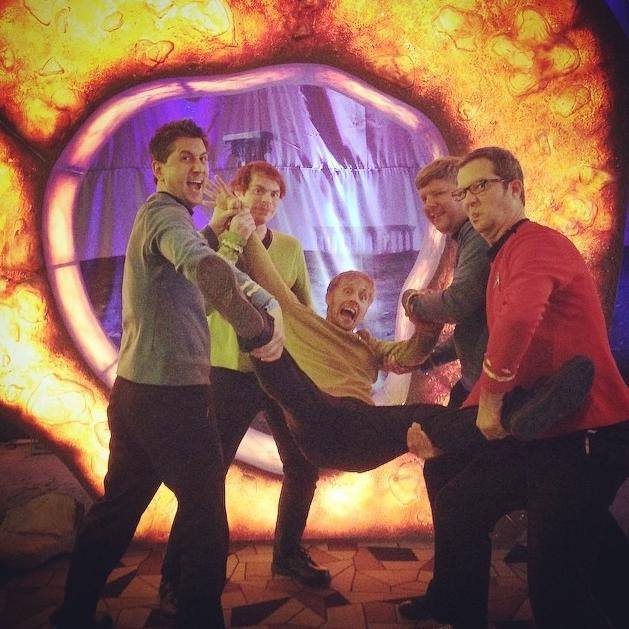
- Five Year Mission

Background information
- Origin: Indianapolis, Indiana
- Genres: Rock, alternative rock, power pop
- Years active: 2010–present
- Members: Noah Butler; Andy Fark; Patrick O'Connor; Mike Rittenhouse; Chris Spurgin
- Website: www.fiveyearmission.net

Five Year Mission is a Star Trek tribute band from Indianapolis, Indiana. The band is composed of five Trekkies who aspire to write a song for every episode of the original Star Trek series.

== History ==
The idea to write a song for every Star Trek episode was created by Mike Rittenhouse. He approached Noah Butler, whom he knew was a Star Trek fan, and the two decided to form a band to record the songs in-studio. They proceeded to find three additional bandmates, Patrick O'Connor, Chris Spurgin, and Andy Fark, and four of them served as songwriters, each selecting Star Trek episodes to write about for Year One.

The band performed live for the first time, wearing Star Trek uniforms, at the Melody Inn in 2010. They were named "Best New Band" in Indianapolis that year. They released their debut CD, Year One, in 2010. Their CD release party was held at Starbase Indy. At the same convention, Tim Russ performed with the band.

Their second album, Year Two, came out in 2011 at Starbase Indy. The band performed in a battle of the bands against a Klingon themed band, Il Troubadour, at the convention that year as well. In 2013, the band released their third album, Trouble with Tribbles, a five-song EP about the Star Trek episode with the same name. Each band member wrote their own song about the episode, including Fark, who had not yet composed a song for the band. Their following album, Year Three was released in 2014.

Their most recent album, Spock's Brain, was released in July 2015. The album includes 10 original songs about the infamous episode Spock's Brain, as well as a bonus track, "Spock's Dog".

A tribute video for George Takei's birthday, released on YouTube, received over 82,000 views.

== Members ==
- Noah Butler - Lead vocals, guitar, bass guitar, backing vocals and keyboard.
- Andy Fark - drums, lead vocals, and backing vocals
- Patrick O'Connor - Lead vocals, guitar, bass guitar, backing vocals and keyboard
- Mike Rittenhouse - Lead vocals, guitar, bass guitar, backing vocals and keyboard
- Chris Spurgin - Lead vocals, guitar, bass guitar, backing vocals and keyboard

== Studio albums ==
Year One

- Released: 2010
- Format: CD

Year Two

- Released: 2011
- Format: CD

The Trouble With Tribbles

- Released: 2012
- Format: LP

Year Three

- Released: 2013
- Format: CD

Spock's Dog

- Released: 2014
- Format: CD

Spock's Brain

- Released: 2015
- Format: CD

Year Four

- Released: 2018
- Format: CD

== Shows ==
Five Year Mission attends many sci-fi conventions throughout the year, as well as all-ages and bar shows.

=== Local ===
They frequent Indianapolis bars Radio Radio, Locals Only and The Melody Inn (where they have played at the event Punk Rock Prom). They have appeared at local all ages venues Indy CD and Vinyl, Monon Coffee Company, Scotty's Brewhouse, Old National Centre, Crane Event Center, and Hero House Comics. They have also made appearances at the Indianapolis area conventions Starbase Indy, InConJunction, Indy Pop Con, and Gen Con Indy. On July 26, 2014, the band played a special show at the Nuvo Best of Indy Block Party in downtown Indianapolis. Directly after this show, they journeyed a few blocks away to Scotty's Brewhouse and played a more intimate concert there. On October 29, 2015, they again played at the Nuvo Best of Indy Show, this time to celebrate their win for "Best Local Music Video".

=== Nonlocal ===
They first played at a Wizard World convention in Chicago in 2011, and then the next year appeared at the Wizard World Convention in New Orleans, where they opened for William Shatner. In the summer of 2011, they traveled to Riverside, Iowa (future birthplace of Captain Kirk) to play at Trek Fest. On February 9, 2013, they traveled to Dayton, Ohio where they played two shows, one at Bell Book and Comic and one at Omega Music. On October 12 of the same year, they played at Pandoracon in Cincinnati, Ohio. Early in 2014, they played their first show in the state of Kentucky, a convention in Bowling Green called Concave. In September 2014, they ventured to Lexington, Kentucky to play at a Star Trek party at Al's Bar. They also served as the house band for Star Trek Las Vegas in August 2014. On March 20, 2015, Five Year Mission performed at the Arcada Theatre in Chicago, and on the following day they played a show at Carnahan Hall in Lafayette, Indiana.

== Influences ==
The band has many musical influences, including The Cure, Fugazi, Warp 11, The Dead Milkmen, Electric Light Orchestra, Sigur Rós, Wilco, They Might Be Giants, Green Day, NOFX, Ramones and the Beatles.
