= Larry Nemecek =

American artist in the Star Trek franchise

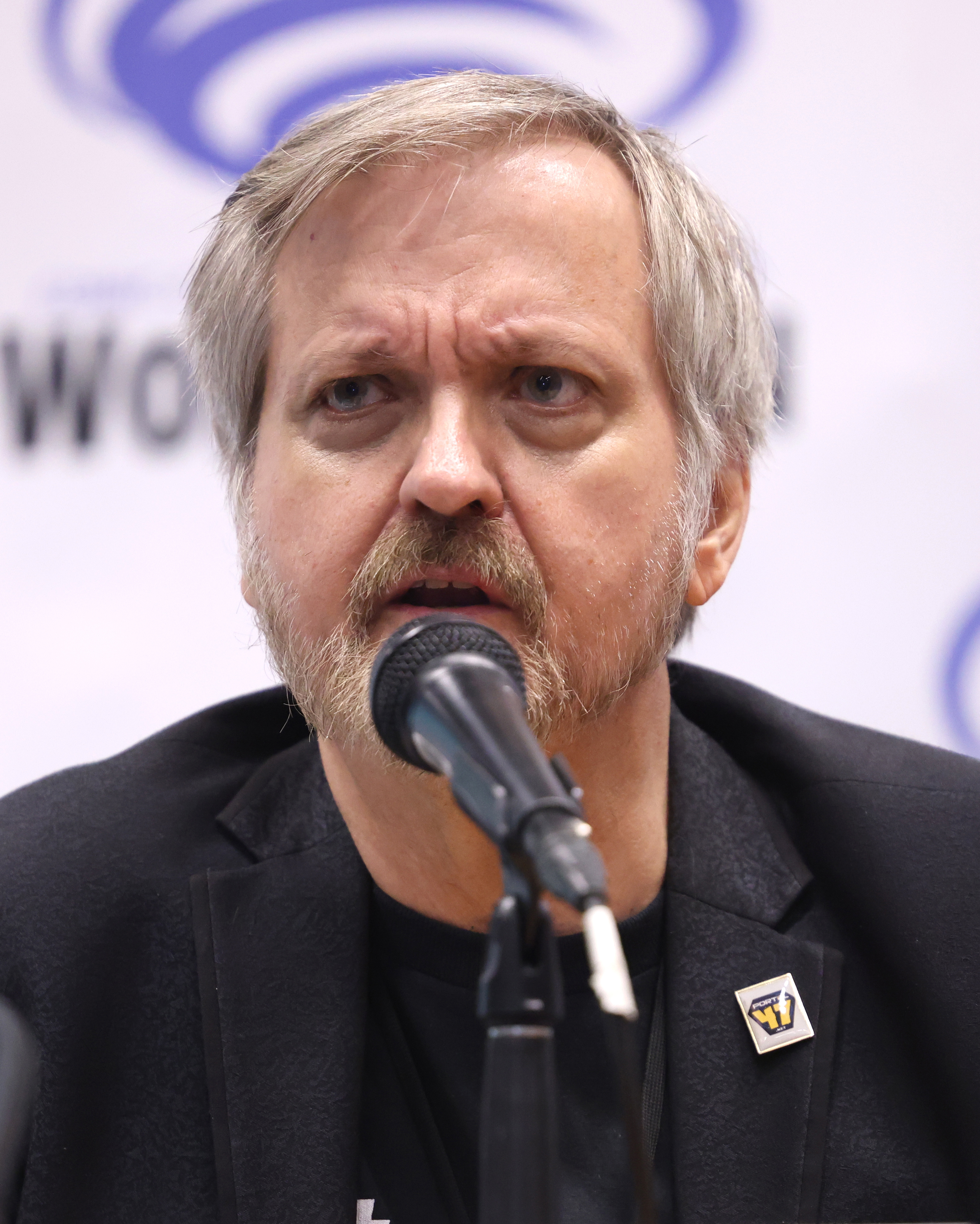
- Nemecek in 2025
- Occupations: Actor, author
- Website: www.larrynemecek.com

Larry Nemecek is an actor and writer in the Star Trek franchise.

== Professional career ==
He has portrayed Dr. McCoy in the Star Trek Continues web series episodes "Pilgrim of Eternity" and "Lolani" and served as the series's Creative Consultant.

In 2022, he was inducted into the Oklahoma Speculative Fiction Hall of Fame by the Future Society of Central Oklahoma.
