= David Reddick =

American artist (born 1971)

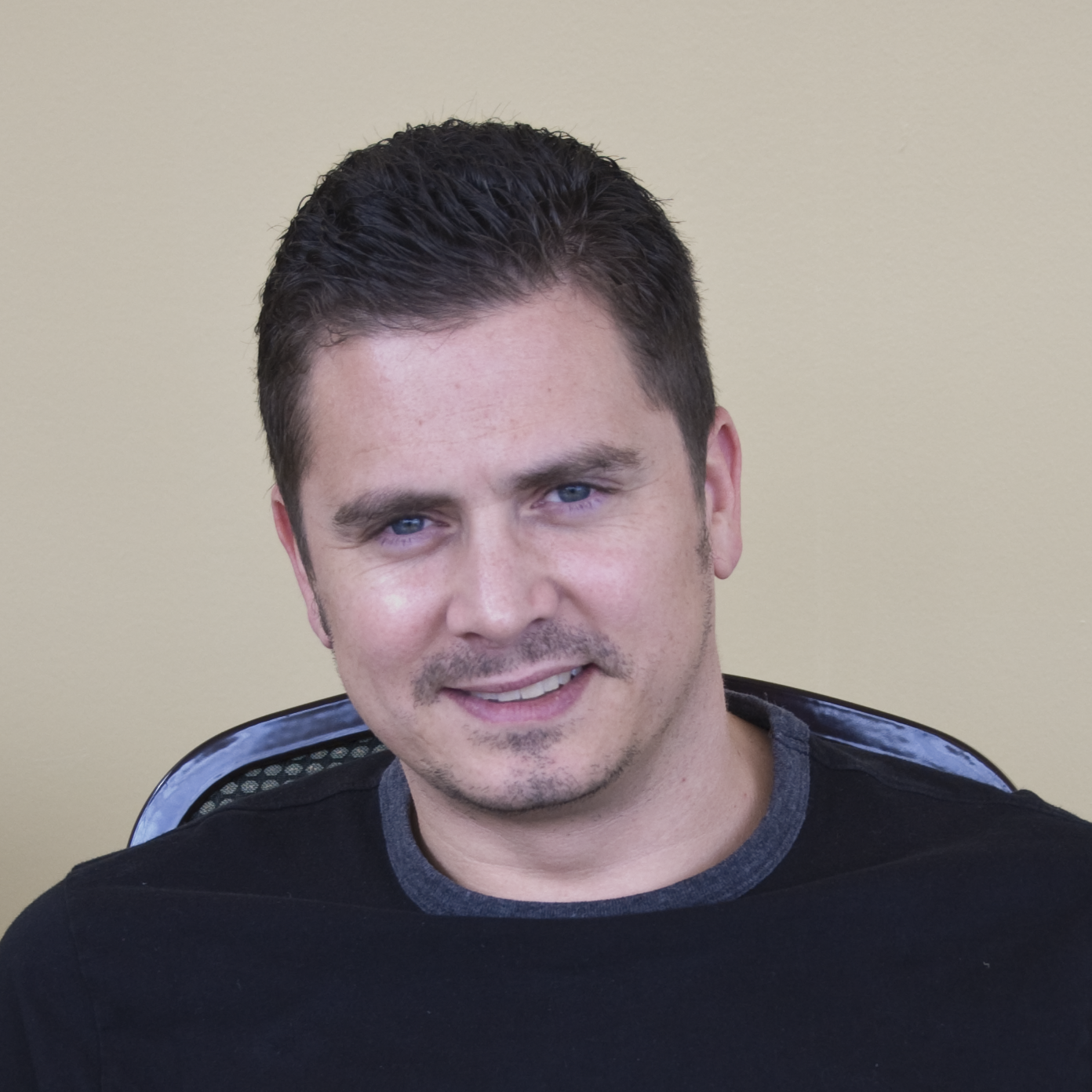
- Reddick in 2008
- Born: David Eugene Reddick; April 14, 1971 (age 55); Anderson, Indiana, U.S.
- Education: Herron School of Art and Design
- Occupations: Artist, cartoonist, illustrator
- Employer: King Features Syndicate
- Website: davidreddickstudio.com

David Reddick (born April 14, 1971) is an American artist, illustrator and cartoonist. He is the creator of comic strips Legend of Bill, The Trek Life, Gene's Journal and Rod & Barry at Roddenberry.com, and is a full-time cartoonist at Paws, Inc., where he works on the Garfield property.

Reddick began writing The Trek Life in August 2005 as a weekly strip for StarTrek.com. The Trek Life follows three childhood friends who are all Star Trek fans. Reddick's webcomic stopped in December 2007, though Reddick stated that the strip would continue in Star Trek Magazine.
