= Lolani =

- Star Trek Continues episode
- Official poster of the episode "Lolani"
- Episode no.: Episode 2
- Directed by: Chris White
- Story by: Vic Mignogna & Huston Huddleston
- Teleplay by: Huston Huddleston and Paul Bianchi
- Cinematography by: Matt Bucy
- Original air date: February 8, 2014
- Running time: 50:46

Guest appearances
- Lou Ferrigno - Zaminhon; Fiona Vroom - Lolani; Matthew Ewald - Crewman Kenway; Erin Gray - Commodore Gray; Daniel Logan - Ensign Tongaroa

Episode chronology
| ← Previous "Pilgrim of Eternity" | Next → "Fairest of Them All" |

"Lolani" is a fan-produced Star Trek episode released in 2014, the second in the web series Star Trek Continues, which aims to continue the episodes of Star Trek: The Original Series while replicating their visual and storytelling style. It was written by Paul Bianchi and Huston Huddleston from a story by Huston Huddleston and Vic Mignogna, and directed by Chris White.

== Plot summary ==
The Enterprise receives a distress signal from a Tellarite vessel. On board, they find three dead Tellarite crew members and an Orion slave woman called Lolani, who has no memory of how her traveling companions died. An investigation conducted by Spock and the security chief hints that two of the crew members were killed in a firefight while the third, Lolani's owner, died from a puncture wound to the throat, possibly from a dagger owned by his slave.

Lolani implores the crew of the Enterprise not to return her to her previous owner, an Orion slave trader named Zaminhon, who she describes as a violent and brute monster. Kirk wants to find a way to save Lolani from a future of slavery and violence, but Starfleet's Commodore Gray is not willing to risk an interstellar diplomatic incident with the Orion people and orders the Captain to return Lolani to Zaminhon, who will rendezvous with the Enterprise in a few hours.

Lolani tries to escape her fate, first attempting to seduce Kirk using the powerful effects that Orion pheromones have on human males, then pleading for help from crewman Matthew Kenway, who has fallen in love with her. None of her attempts work, and a mind meld with Spock finally reveals that the woman accidentally killed two of the Tellarite crew members while trying to defend herself, then purposefully killed her owner as well.

Zaminhon arrives aboard the Enterprise. A diplomatic dinner organized by the Captain to convince the slave trader to free Lolani does not produce the desired result. Instead, tension arises when Zaminhon physically assaults Lolani for having described him as a brute monster. Kirk tries to stop the slave trader, and even makes an offer to purchase the woman from him, but Zaminhon is determined to keep Lolani and returns to his ship, taking her with him.

In a last-ditch attempt to save the slave, Kirk announces to the crew that he's about to disobey a direct Starfleet order, and instructs Sulu to pursue Zaminhon's ship, but before he can give the order to transport Lolani back to the Enterprise, Zaminhon's ship suddenly explodes, killing both him and Lolani.

Kirk, saddened and defeated, retires to her guest quarters, where he finds a message recorded by Lolani in which she states that her sacrifice will serve as an example for other Orion slaves; Kirk plays her message to the entire crew over the ship's comm system. In the last scene, crewman Kenway asks the Captain for a prolonged leave, which he intends to use to help the oppressed Orion people. Kirk grants the leave and gives Lolani's recording to Kenway. The crewman leaves, leaving Kirk to his grim thoughts.

== Production and release ==
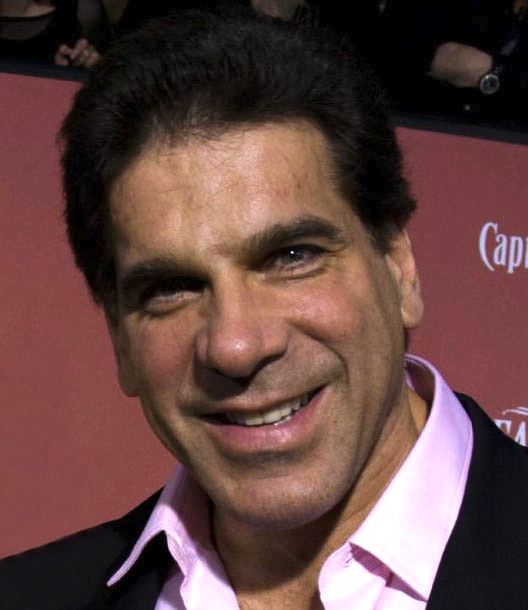
Actor Lou Ferrigno portrays the Orion trader Zaminhon

As with every episode of Star Trek Continues, the shooting of the Enterprise scenes took place in Kingsland, Georgia, at a facility owned by Farragut Films and their partners.

"Lolani" was shot in October 2013, and its costs were covered with money raised through a successful Kickstarter campaign.

Guest cast for this episode included:

- Lou Ferrigno as Zaminhon (Ferrigno is best known for his portrayal of the Hulk from the 1978 TV series The Incredible Hulk, as well as the voice of the Hulk in the 2008 Marvel Cinematic Universe movie of the same name)
- Fiona Vroom as Lolani
- Matthew Ewald as Crewman Matthew Kenway (Ewald is best known for his lead role in FOXKids series Galidor: Defenders of the Outer Dimension)
- Erin Gray as Commodore Gray (better known as Col. Wilma Deering from Buck Rogers in the 25th Century)
- Daniel Logan as Ensign Tongaroa (Logan previously played the young Boba Fett from Star Wars: Episode II – Attack of the Clones)

Lou Ferrigno had to go through a four-hour makeup session to acquire the green tint of an Orion alien, which reminded him of the similar iconic green color that the actor had in the 1978 TV series The Incredible Hulk. Two more hours were required to remove the makeup. The makeup process was quite tough for Ferrigno, but the actor was determined to play the role both because he was a big fan of the original Star Trek series and because he was confident that he could excel as the character.

The Orion Starship model is based on the Aluminum Model Toys plastic model starship, the Leif Ericson, designed by Matt Jefferies, designer of the original Starship Enterprise. The Leif Ericson was released in 1968, in an attempt to cash in on the Star Trek craze of the 1960's.

The shooting for the episode was completed in November 2013. The episode was first shown to the public at the Dallas Comic Con Sci-Fi Expo on February 8, 2014.

== Reception ==
Reviews of "Lolani" have been positive. Sam Sloan of Slice of SciFi wrote: "On a scale of 1 to 10 with 10 being the best 'Lolani' rates an easy 8.5. It was thoroughly watchable with rarely a boring moment".

More than one reviewer commented on how the episode dealt with the topics of sexual objectification and slavery. Howard Andrew Jones of the magazine Black Gate wrote: "If you're a fan of the original Star Trek series, you MUST watch 'Lolani'. Even more so than 'Pilgrim of Eternity', it feels like a lost episode" and highlighted how "Lolani" presented an original and more serious take of female Orion slaves, usually depicted in the official franchise as simple femme fatale women. A similar sentiment was shared by MaryAnn Johanson of FlickFilosopher.com, who wrote: "Because 'Lolani' better shows the potential that Continues has: to bring a more modern progressive attitude to universe that is Star Trek. Not that the original Trek wasn't progressive, but 'Lolani' pushes that to a place where a 1960s TV show couldn't have gone".

== See also ==
- Star Trek fan productions
