= Daniel Logan =

New Zealand actor (born 1987)

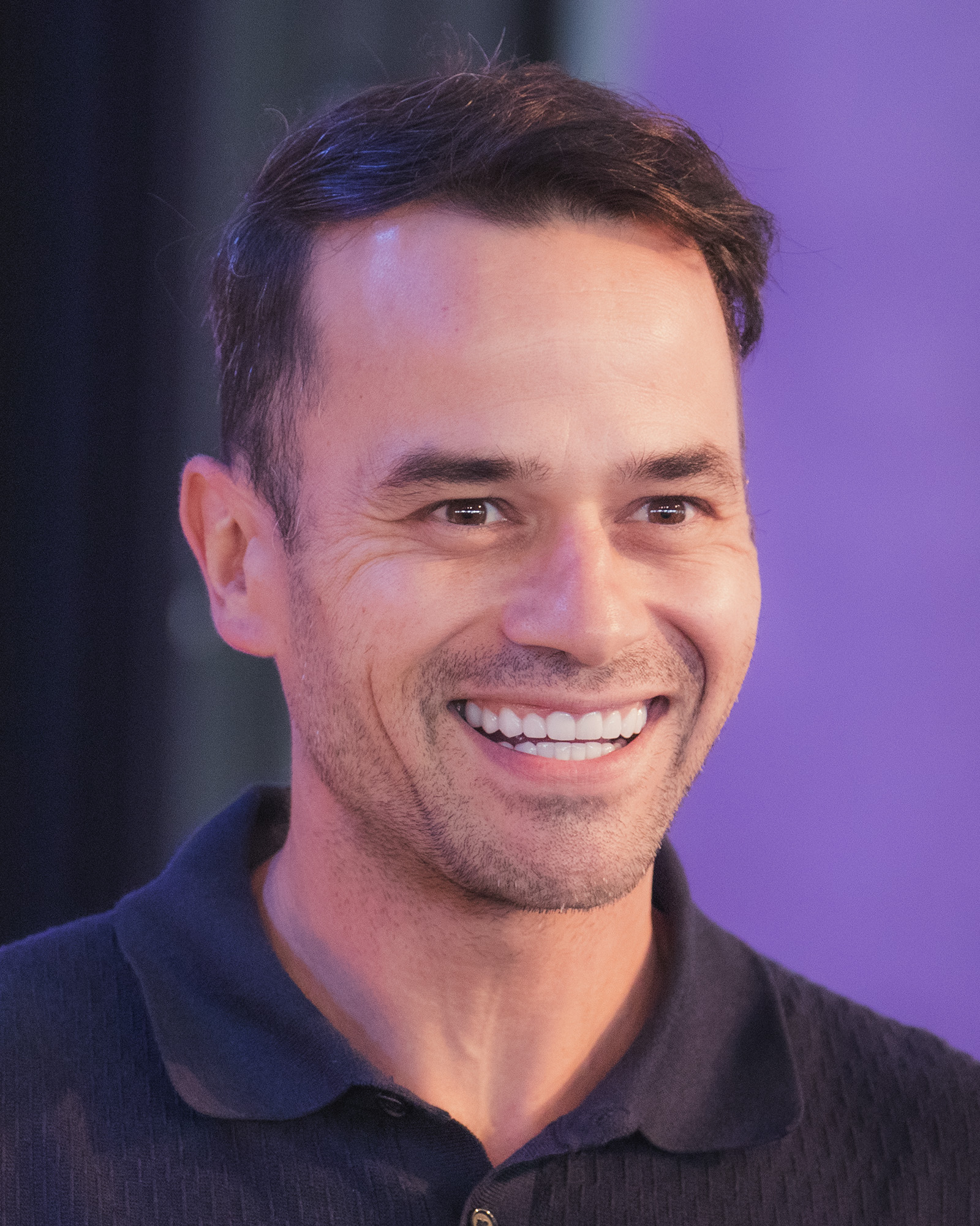
- Logan in 2026
- Born: 6 June 1987 (age 39); Auckland, New Zealand
- Citizenship: United States; New Zealand
- Occupation: Actor
- Years active: 1990–present
- Children: 1

Daniel Logan (born 6 June 1987) is a New Zealand-born American actor. He is best known for his portrayal of young Boba Fett from the 2002 film Star Wars: Episode II – Attack of the Clones, for which he was nominated for a Young Artist Award for Best Performance in a Feature Film (Supporting Actor) at the age of 15. Logan also voiced Fett in the animated series Star Wars: The Clone Wars.

== Early life ==
Logan was born in Auckland on 6 June 1987 to an English mother and a Māori-Samoan father.

== Career ==
In 1990, he broke into acting when his amateur rugby union team was scouted for a TV commercial, where he was chosen to play the role of a small child who gets knocked into the mud by Auckland rugby star Michael Jones. Picked up by a casting agent, he began to do more commercials and TV appearances, including a recurring role in episodes of the New Zealand-based medical series Shortland Street and a guest appearance in the international series Hercules: The Legendary Journeys.

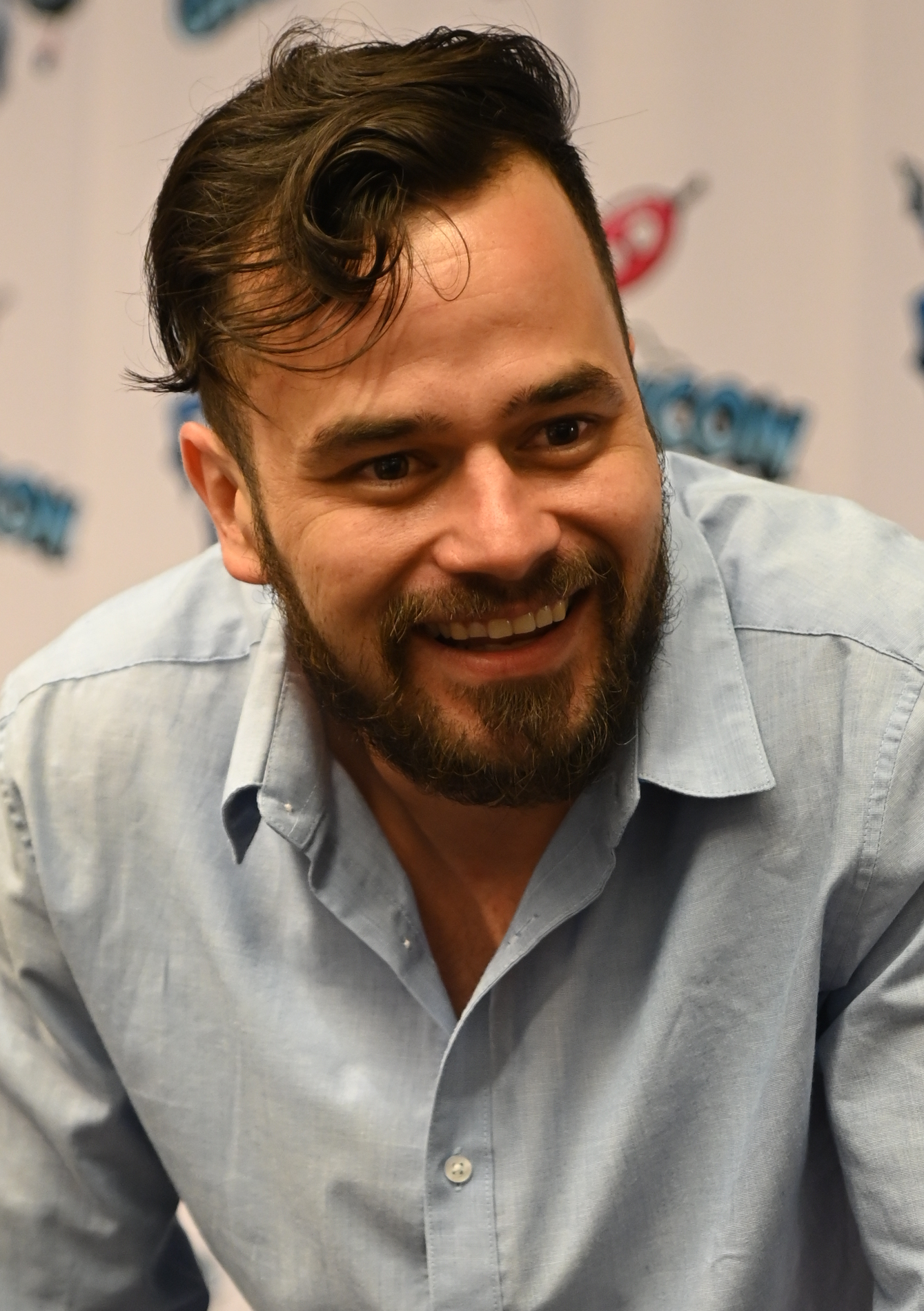
Logan at the 2019 GalaxyCon Raleigh

Logan is best known for his role as the young Boba Fett in Star Wars: Episode II – Attack of the Clones. In an interview with Star Wars Insider, Logan said he had not watched Star Wars nor had any idea who Fett was before playing the part. He reprised his role in Star Wars: The Clone Wars and appeared through archive footage in The Book of Boba Fett.

Logan has attended several conventions as part of Star Wars Celebration as a guest.

== Personal life ==
In 2017, Logan was granted American citizenship. He now lives in Tustin, California.

== Filmography ==
Year	Title	Role	Notes	Ref
1998	Shortland Street	Ben Hollins		
1999	Hercules: The Legendary Journeys	Zaylan	Episode: "Redemption"	
2002	Star Wars: Episode II – Attack of the Clones	Young Boba Fett / Young Jango Fett Clone Cadets		
2003	The Legend of Johnny Lingo	Young Pua		
2010–2012	Star Wars: The Clone Wars	Young Boba Fett / Young Jango Fett Clone Cadets (voice)	6 episodes	
2014	Star Trek Continues	Ensign Tongaroa	Episode: "Lolani"	
2016	Sharknado: The 4th Awakens	Captain Fett	Television film	
2021–2022	The Book of Boba Fett	Young Boba Fett	3 episodes (archive footage)	
2022	Lego Star Wars: The Skywalker Saga	Boba Fett (voice)	Video game	
2024	Star Wars: The Bad Batch	Mox (voice)	2 episodes	

== Print sources ==
- Wilkins, Jonathan, ed. (2016). The Best of Star Wars Volume 2 (Paperback) (1st ed.). London: Titan. ISBN 9781785851179.
