= Mu Epsilon Kappa =

American anime-interest fraternity

- ΜΕΚ
- Founded: 1980; 46 years ago: University of North Texas; Mississippi State University
- Type: Social
- Affiliation: Independent
- Status: Active
- Emphasis: Anime
- Scope: National
- Colors: Purple and Silver
- Chapters: 26
- Nickname: "Kappas"
- Headquarters: United States
- Website: www.muepsilonkappa.com

Mu Epsilon Kappa (ΜΕΚ) is an American college fraternity for students who are interested in anime. It was established in 1980 at the University of North Texas in Denton, Texas.

== History ==
The Mu Epsilon Kappa Society started at the University of North Texas in the 1980s as an anime club called Northstar. The name later changed to Mu Epsilon Kappa in 1995 after it was taken over by recently transferred students who had been members of the club by the same name at Texas Tech. Eventually the two clubs, despite the shared name, broke off affiliation. In 2003, a new set of officers were elected on the promise of reforming the club—instituting a more democratic system, expanding club events, and prompting the club to begin taking part in campus events and service projects. Over the next few years, the club membership expanded from a dozen to over a hundred members.

In 2007, they joined with the anime club at Mississippi State University to form the Mu Epsilon Kappa Society, to create a national network of clubs designed to provide a haven for nerdy people to meet others like them. Over the next year, four more university clubs joined Mu Epsilon Kappa. By 2009 the society had expanded to over a dozen chapters in several states.

== Activities ==
Mu Epsilon Kappa participates in several anime conventions, where they host events and cultural activities, and hold leadership seminars; as well as hosting alumni gatherings. Many MEK chapters also participate in local community activities and service projects.

== Chapters ==
Chapters of ΜΕΚ include the following, with active chapters noted in bold and inactive chapters in italics.

Chapter	Charter date	Institution	Location	Status	Ref.
Alpha	1980	University of North Texas	Denton, Texas	Active	
Alpha Mu	2007	Mississippi State University	Starkville, Mississippi	Active	
Alpha Kappa	2008	University of Texas at San Antonio	San Antonio, Texas	Active	
Delta Nu	2008	Virginia Tech	Blacksburg, Virginia	Active	
Omega Pi	2008	LeTourneau University	Longview, Texas	Active	
Pi Rho	2008	Angelo State University	San Angelo, Texas	Active	
Chi Rho	2009	University of New Mexico	Albuquerque, New Mexico	Active	
Pi Tau	2009	University of Pittsburgh	Pittsburgh, Pennsylvania	Active	
Omicron Xi	2009	St. Mary's University	San Antonio, Texas	Active	
Omega Psi	2009	University of Louisiana at Lafayette	Lafayette, Louisiana	Active	
Alpha Tau		McMurry University	Abilene, Texas	Active	
Mu Upsilon		Kettering University	Flint, Michigan	Active	
Psi Phi		Midwestern State University	Wichita Falls, Texas	Active	
Alpha Nu		University of Houston	Houston, Texas	Active	
Theta Zeta		Lone Star College–Montgomery	The Woodlands, Texas	Active	
Lambda Delta		Louisiana Tech University	Ruston, Louisiana	Active	
Theta Sigma		Webster University	Webster Groves, Missouri	Active	
Omicron Pi		University of Texas at Dallas	Richardson, Texas	Active	
Omega Nu		University of the Ozarks	Clarksville, Arkansas	Active	
Nu Mu		University of New Orleans	New Orleans, Louisiana	Active	
Omega Mu		Lamar University	Beaumont, Texas	Active	
Eta Pi		Texas Christian University	Fort Worth, Texas	Active	
Kappa Lambda		University of Houston–Clear Lake	Pasadena, Texas	Active	
Xi Rho		Tarrant County College (South campus)	Tarrant County, Texas	Active	
Delta Zeta		Brookhaven College	Farmers Branch, Texas	Active	
Nu Phi		Pierce College (District)	Pierce County, Washington	Active	
