= Nalini Krishan =

Australian actress

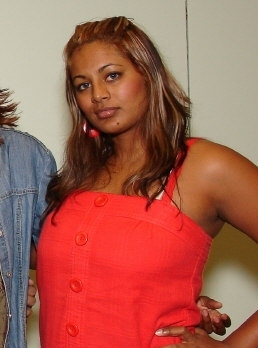
- Born: August 30, 1977 (age 49)
- Occupation: Actress
- Years active: 1998–present

Nalini Krishan (born 30 August 1977) is an Australian actress best known for role as Barriss Offee in Star Wars: Episode II – Attack of the Clones.

== Early life ==
Nalini Krishan is an Indo-Fijian who was raised in Australia.

== Early career ==
Nalini Krishan is currently filming reality TV series called Bollywood Factor in Australia, airing on Divya TV and c31 Indian Cable TV network in the United States, United Kingdom, and Australia in April 2014.

Krishan is an Australian actress who has had roles in Swift and Shift Couriers, Love Pizza, an array of TV commercials and starred in some Bollywood films such as Prem Aggan and Soldier, just to name a few.

Krishan has been acting and modeling for the last 18 years. She is a former miss Fiji Indian Sun winner and also has graced the catwalk through many Indian community events. Nalini has travelled around the world meeting many fans at conventions in USA, Canada, Europe, Japan, New Zealand, and Australia from her most notable role in the second Star Wars episode where she played Jedi Barriss Offee.

Krishan’s bio includes lead roles such as the lead in short film Noise, a guest star role in Love you Krishna, the feature film coming out in cinemas 2014 and before that she played the lead in the theatre play Curry for Lunch. Her most recent debut is in the reality TV series Bollywood Factor, where she is one of the five finalists. Airing on US, UK, and Australian Indian cable networks in 2014.

Krishan moved to the United States after her role in Star Wars, where she is based in Los Angeles.

Nalini Krishan was on 2 June 2017 inducted as an honorary member of The Galactic Academy Tatooine largest campus in the caribbean. The Galactic Academy is a worldwide organization with over 30 campuses around the world . She spoke to around 150 graduating padawans plus family members at one of the largest meetings of educators on the island of Puerto Rico that very same day.

== Filmography ==
=== Film ===
Year	Title	Role	Notes
1998	Soldier	Unknown role	
1998	Prem Aggan	Pooja	Uncredited
1999	Holy Smoke!	Poor Beggar Girl / Voiceovers	Uncredited
2002	Star Wars: Episode II – Attack of the Clones	Barriss Offee	Uncredited
2007	The Benvenuti Family	Mrs. Rahabi	Television film
2012	Posey	Bollywood Dancer	Short film
2014	Love You Krishna	Vishakha	
2015	One Less God	Ambulance officer	
2017	Blood Sucka Jones	Nurse Elvira	

=== Television ===
Year	Title	Role	Notes
2000	Pizza	Elevator Girl	Episode: "Love Pizza"
