= Orli Shoshan =

Israeli film actress (born 1974)

- אורלי שושן
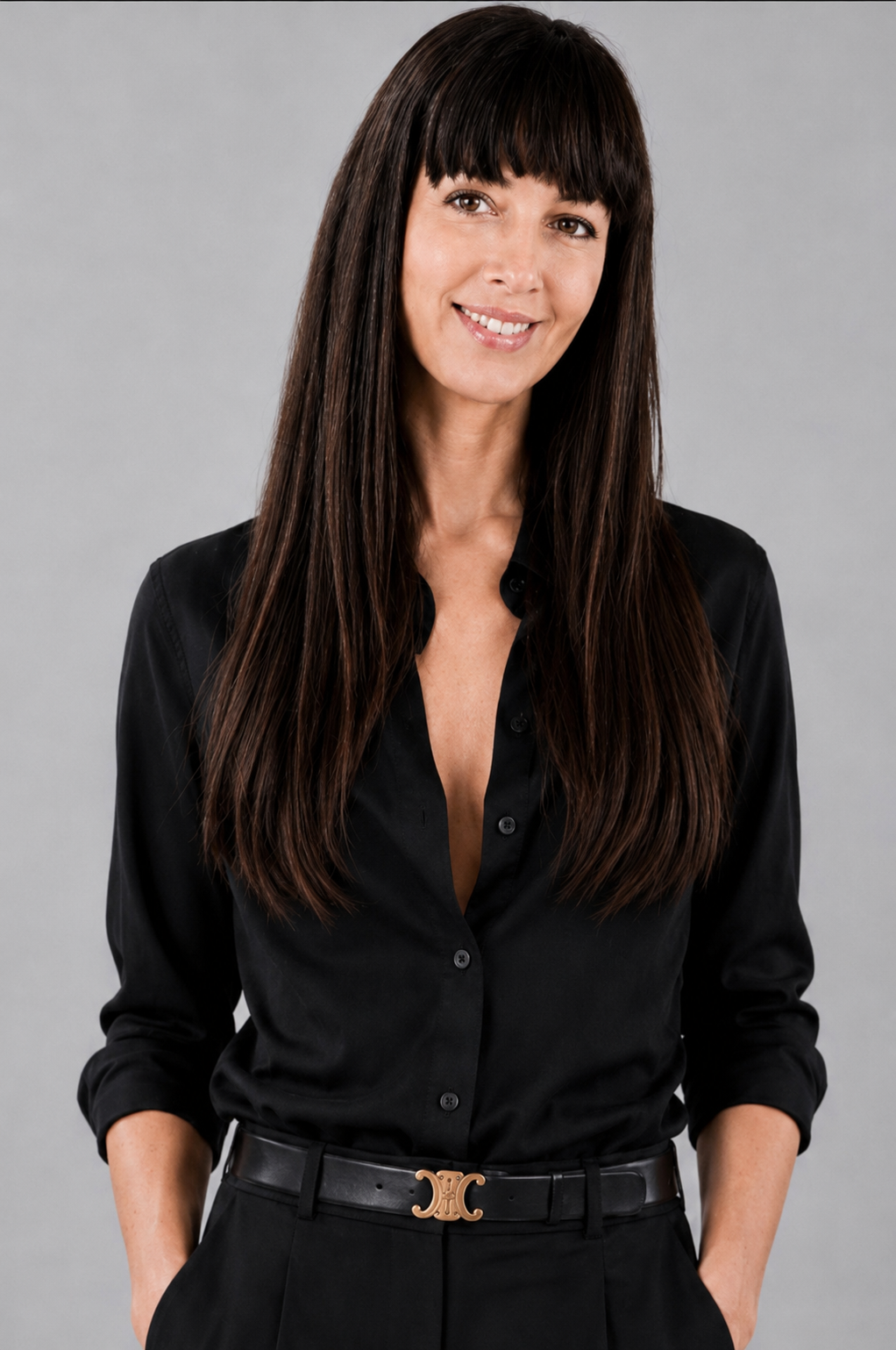
- Born: July 23, 1974 (age 52); Tel Aviv, Israel
- Occupations: Actress, model
- Years active: 2002–present
- Known for: Role of Shaak Ti in Star Wars
- Website: http://www.orli-shoshan.com/

Orli Shoshan (Hebrew: אורלי שושן; born July 23, 1974) is an Israeli film actress best known for her performance as the Togruta Jedi Master Shaak Ti in the 1999–2005 Star Wars prequel trilogy. It is believed that Shaak Ti's expertise in melee combat is in homage to Orli Shoshan, a former member of the Israeli Defense Forces and a skilled hand-to-hand combat and melee weapons artist.

== Early life ==
Orli Shoshan was born and raised in Tel Aviv, Israel. At the age of 18 she was conscripted into the Israeli Army, in which she served for almost two years. After her military service, she began working for an Israeli airline, which brought her to the United States and then to Chicago, Illinois, where she currently resides. During her employment for El Al Israel Airlines Ltd, she grew a great passion for traveling when visiting places such as India, Thailand, and Australia. Orli Shoshan grew most fond of the Australian people and way of life, so she decided to move to Sydney, Australia.

== Early career ==
In Sydney, she began her successful modeling career enjoying print work in magazines and catalogues, then on the runway as well as many television commercials. All of this eventually culminated into her acting role in the popular sci-fi franchise "Star Wars." Orli Shoshan played the exotic Togruta Jedi Master Shaak Ti in the Star Wars space opera films Star Wars: Episode II – Attack of the Clones and Star Wars: Episode III – Revenge of the Sith in the 1999–2005 saga prequel trilogy. Shaak Ti is a popular character that can be found celebrated through many action figures, LEGO sets, comic books, and video games. While in Australia, she would work on other major television shows such as the Wheel of Fortune (Australian game show) presenting prizes and an exercise & fitness program Aerobics Oz Style.

Orli Shoshan is model, actress, and also a fashion designer. While in Australia, she created a clothing line for women's sportswear called "Orli." This line featured casual sportswear. "Orli" was sold at high end boutiques and gyms across Australia. After several years, she moved from Australia to Japan to further her modeling career. In Japan she was a featured guest at her very first Star Wars convention.

After many years of traveling the world, Orli went back to her roots and moved to Israel to attend the prestigious acting school the Studio by Yuval Carmi. Once she finished acting school, she decided to start a second fashion line, this time for lingerie called Mia Luce.

== Personal life and current professional life ==
Orli Shoshan currently resides in Chicago, Illinois. She is married and is a mother of two girls. She took some time off from her modeling and acting career to look after her children. She later resumed both careers and also attend many sci-fi conventions around the world. She works now in home staging and interior design. Orli has opened her website about her label called O Designs By Orli Shoshan, LLC and she is also working as a real estate agent. Concerning her model pictures, Orli works with her personal and professional photographer, Lynne Peters (Lynne Peters Photography) based also in Chicago, Illinois providing professional photography nationally in the US and internationally for celebrities, events and weddings.

== Filmography ==
Year	Title	Role	Notes
2002	Star Wars: Episode II – Attack of the Clones	Shaak Ti	Uncredited
2005	Star Wars: Episode III – Revenge of the Sith	Shaak Ti	Uncredited
