= Tim Brazeal =

American Star Trek fan

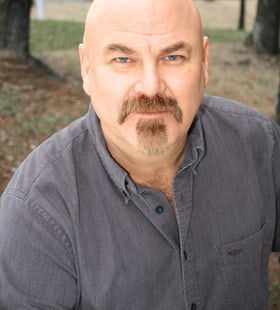
- Tim Brazeal Class of 91
- Born: May 7, 1961 (age 65); Amarillo, Texas, U.S.
- Height: 5 ft 11 in (1.80 m)

Tim Brazeal was born and raised in West Texas and later moved to Tennessee and Ohio where he resides. He is known for a controversial campaign to save the TV series Star Trek: Enterprise from cancellation, which claimed to raise over US$3 million but ended in failure.

== Campaign to save Enterprise ==
Brazeal first found fame from starting the world wide campaign to Save Star Trek from cancellation where he claimed to have raised $140,000 in donations and pledges for a further 3 million dollars in under two months to attempt to fund a further season of Star Trek: Enterprise. Brazeal announced that he hoped to raise the full $32m needed to fund an entire season.

He became an instant celebrity in the sci-fi genre for his efforts. He was also voted Sci-Fi person of the year tying with Manny Coto, Executive Producer for the hit series 24 and Co Executive Producer for Star Trek: Enterprise. Mr. Brazeal received a medal of an achievement from The United States Air Force for his efforts.

He was interviewed over 300 times in just a few months. Mr. Brazeal was on Letterman, CNN, MSNBC, BBC and every major newspaper around the world. He also ran a full page ad in the L.A. Times to Save Star Trek which was the primary cause of the world wide media attention.

However, he was accused of running a scam when it emerged that Paramount had secretly told him they would not un-cancel the series no matter how much money he raised and he had failed to pass this information on. His campaign ended in April 2005 when it became clear the series would not continue.

== Other activities ==
His first acting role was playing the part of a Klingon in Star Trek New Voyages where he returned for additional roles. In 2009 he appeared in Tyler Perry’s latest film "I can do bad all by myself," Arts and Entertainment Channel, Snapped, Oxygen Channel, The History Channel, and new horror film from the U.K titled “Jacob”. Tim is also a series producer for the Sci-Fi series IQ-145 starring Thomas Dekker from Sarah Connor Chronicles.

He is currently playing the lead role in a new series titled "The Investigators" as well as producing other films from his studio in Knoxville, Tennessee.
